= Wildfires in 2026 =

List of major wildfires in the year 2026

2026 wildfire season
- Date: January – December 2026

Impacts
- Deaths: 32+
- Injuries: 83+
- Structures destroyed: 325+

The 2026 wildfire season involves wildfires on multiple continents.

Below is an ongoing list of articles on wildfires from around the world in the year 2026.

== Africa ==
=== Algeria ===
- 2026 Algeria wildfires

== Asia ==
=== Japan ===
- 2026 Ōtsuchi wildfire

=== Turkey ===
- Muğla Wildfire

=== Indonesia ===
- 2026 Indonesia wildfires
  - Bromo Tengger Semeru National Park Wildfire

=== Mongolia ===
- Numrug National Park wildfire

== Europe ==
=== Belgium ===
- 2026 Belgium wildfires
  - Hautes Fagnes wildfire

=== Croatia ===
- 2026 Croatia wildfires
  - The Hvar Island Fire
  - Korčula Island Fire
  - Lokva Rogoznica Wildfire

=== France ===
- 2026 France wildfires
  - Trévillach Wildfire
  - 2026 Fontainebleau wildfire
  - Gironde Wildfire

=== Greece ===
- 2026 Greece wildfires
  - Thessaloniki Wildfire
  - Paros Wildfire

=== Germany ===
- Müritz National Park fire

=== Ireland ===
- Slievenamon Fire

=== Italy ===
- 2026 Italy wildfires

=== Norway ===
- Krokstadelva fire

=== Portugal ===
- 2026 Portugal wildfires
  - Sernada do Préstimo / Northern Forest Wildfire
  - The Vouzela Wildfire

=== Spain ===
- 2026 Spain wildfires
  - 2026 Los Gallardos wildfire
  - The Girona Wildfire

=== Ukraine ===
- 2026 Chernobyl exclusion zone wildfires

=== United Kingdom ===
See also: 2026 United Kingdom wildfires

- 2026 Dunwich Heath wildfire
- Dovestone Moor Fire
- The Camberley Fire
- 2026 Cairngorms wildfire
- The Braichmelyn Forest Fire
- The Conwy Mountain Fire
- 2026 New Forest wildfire

=== Netherlands ===
- Venray Forest fire

== North America ==
=== United States ===
- 2026 United States wildfires
  - 2026 Alabama wildfires
  - 2026 Alaska wildfires
  - 2026 Arizona wildfires
  - 2026 California wildfires
    - Sandy Fire
    - Bain Fire
    - Santa Rosa Island Fire
  - 2026 Colorado wildfires
    - Snyder Fire
  - 2026 Florida wildfires
    - National Fire
  - 2026 Georgia wildfires
    - Highway 82 Fire
  - 2026 Idaho wildfires
  - 2026 Kansas wildfires
    - Ranger Road Fire
  - 2026 Louisiana wildfires
  - 2026 Mississippi wildfires
  - 2026 Montana wildfires
  - 2026 Nebraska wildfires
    - Morrill Fire
    - Cottonwood Fire
  - 2026 New Mexico wildfires
    - Seven Cabins Fire
  - 2026 Oklahoma wildfires
    - Ranger Road Fire
  - 2026 Oregon wildfires
    - Crosswhite Fire
  - 2026 South Dakota wildfires
  - 2026 Texas wildfires
  - 2026 Utah wildfires
    - Snyder Fire
    - Babylon Fire
    - Cottonwood Fire
  - 2026 Washington wildfires
    - Chelan Hills Fire
    - Kaiser Canyon Fire
    - Little Giant Fire
    - Old Trails Fire
  - 2026 Wyoming wildfires

=== Canada ===
- 2026 Canadian wildfires
  - Thunder Bay 36 Fire

== Oceania ==
=== Australia ===
- 2025–26 Australian bushfire season

== South America ==
=== Argentina ===
- 2026 Argentina wildfires

=== Chile ===
- 2026 Chilean wildfires

== See also ==
- 2026 in the environment
- Weather of 2026
- Wildfires in 2025
