= 2026 United States wildfires =

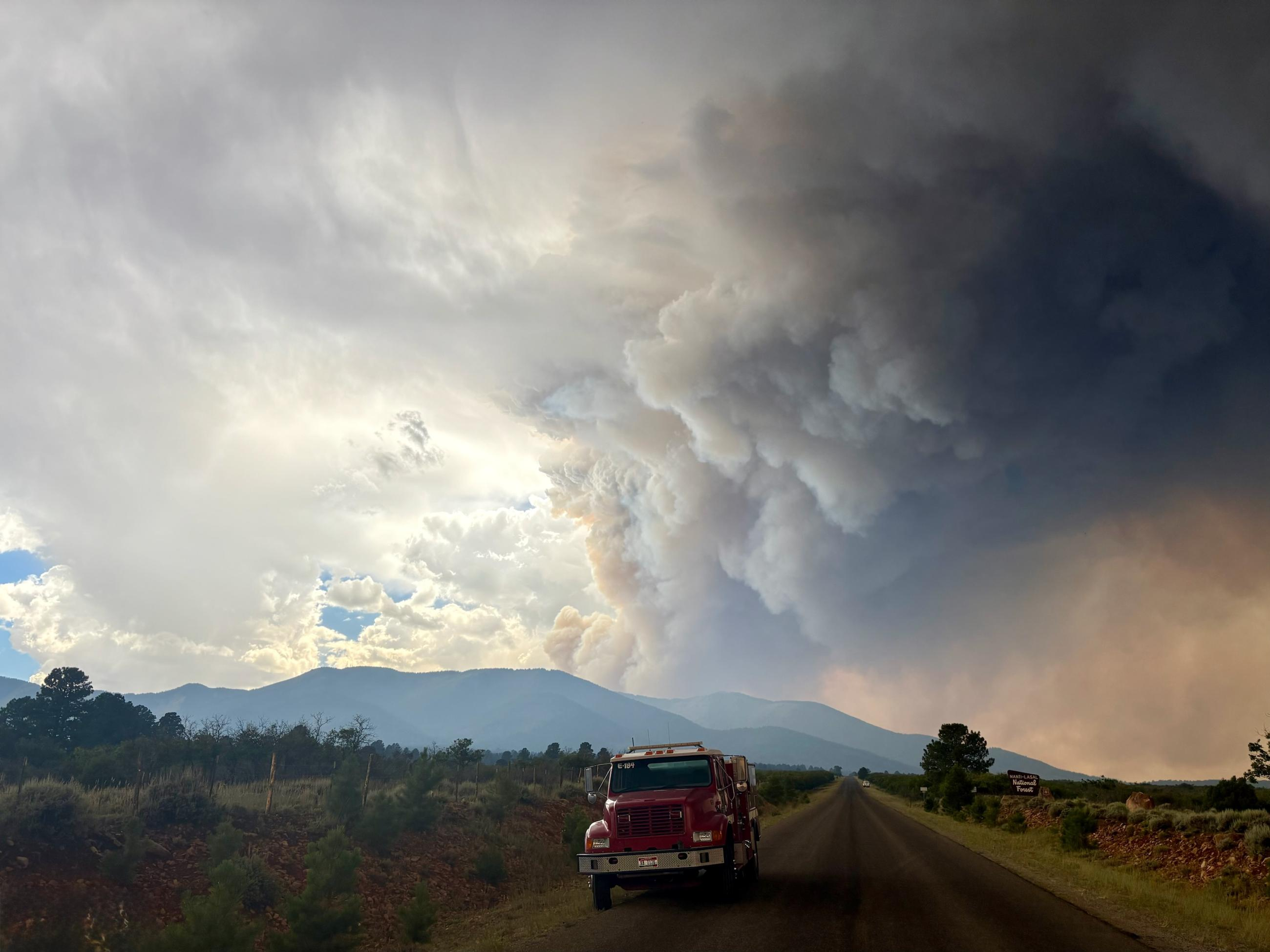
- Activity on the Babylon Fire on July 6
- Date: January 15, 2026 – ongoing

Statistics
- Total fires: 52,253
- Total area: 8,238,284 acres (3,333,915 ha)

Impacts
- Deaths: 9 (Note: Includes five in Colorado, two in Washington, one in Nebraska, and one in Oregon.)

Map
- Perimeters of 2026 United States wildfires ( >1000 acres) (map data)

This page documents wildfires across the United States in 2026 that have burned more than 1,000 acres (400 hectares), produced significant structural damage or casualties, or otherwise been notable. Acreage and containment figures may not be up to date.

== Background ==
=== Season background ===
While most wildfires in the United States occur from May to November, wildfires can occur at any time of the year. Peak fire season typically occurs in August, when temperatures are at their highest and the driest. Wildfires outside of the fire season are becoming more common due to climate change and changing weather patterns. Rising temperatures are leading to earlier snowmelt and later fall and winter precipitation. Drought and hot, dry weather events are becoming more common. Forest pests, such as bark beetles, and invasive species, such as cheatgrass, kill trees and make forests more vulnerable. Areas with dense vegetation or tree cover provide ample fuel for fires.

=== Seasonal forecasts ===
In January 2026, the National Interagency Fire Center (NIFC), issued its National Seasonal Fire Outlook. This forecast projected above-normal wildfire risk for much of Texas, Florida, Georgia, Carolinas, and the southeastearn sector of the United States. The elevated risk was linked primarily to persistent atmospheric patterns resembling La Niña, which typically reduce precipitation and increase temperatures in these regions. The outlook considered factors such as expected temperature and precipitation anomalies, soil moisture, and vegetation dryness to predict fire activity for the upcoming fire season.

=== Climatic conditions ===
Animation of US drought map 2026

In January 2026, the U.S. Drought Monitor reported that 69% of the United States was under drought conditions, with the South being the hardest-hit region. On January 6, for the first time since 2000, California was drought-free. Drought did improve across the South during March, however.

== Seasonal summary ==
Firefighting efforts in 2026 required record mobilization of personnel and resources. Incident management teams, ground crews, and aerial firefighting assets were extensively deployed to manage numerous large and complex fires. However, prescribed burning and mechanical fuel reduction strategies faced limitations due to narrow windows of safe weather conditions and ongoing drought, constraining mitigation options during the critical peak season.

2026 United States wildfires by month
	Jan	Feb	Mar	Apr	May	Jun	Jul	Aug	Sep	Total
Number of Fires	2,909	4,986	8,851	7,320	6,446	5,372	8,120	8,249	9,965	62,218
Acres Burned	34,965	351,026	1,229,692	232,527	562,508	727,676	1,679,856	3,420,034	365,439	8,603,723

== List ==
Name	State	County	Acres	Start date	Containment date (Note: Containment means that fire crews have established and secured control lines around the fire's perimeter. These lines are artificial barriers, like trenches or cleared vegetation, designed to stop the fire's spread, or natural barriers like rivers. Containment reflects progress in managing the fire but does not necessarily mean the fire is starved of fuel, under control, or put out.)	Notes	References
Shell Creek	Oklahoma	McIntosh	1,263	January 15	January 19	2026 Oklahoma wildfires	
Calf	Oklahoma	Pittsburg	1,575	January 16	January 20	2026 Oklahoma wildfires	
Silver Lake	Florida	Wakulla	4,816	January 17	January 22	2026 Florida wildfires - Human-caused in Big Cypress National Preserve. Caused dense smoke across the Florida Heartland Region, leading to the temporary closure of Alligator Alley. The fire led to the evacuation of the community of Jerome from burnout operations.	
Havasu	Arizona	Mohave	3,868	January 19	January 28	2026 Arizona wildfires - Started from an escaped prescribed burn.	
ST-1 Alpha	Florida	Highlands	3,047	February 3	February 5	2026 Florida wildfires	
Curry Island 26	Florida	Glades	1,800	February 7	February 7	2026 Florida wildfires	
Buggy	Florida	Broward	4,267	February 7	February 9	2026 Florida wildfires	
Leche	New Mexico	San Miguel	3,366	February 9	February 19	2026 New Mexico wildfires	
352	New Mexico	Quay	2,674	February 9	February 19	2026 New Mexico wildfires	
West Boundary Road	Florida	Hendry	2,624	February 10	February 17	2026 Florida wildfires	
640	Florida	Polk	1,216	February 10	February 10	2026 Florida wildfires	
Flat Tire	Oklahoma	Beaver	1,983	February 10	February 13	2026 Oklahoma wildfires	
Gray	Oklahoma	McIntosh	1,087	February 10	February 15	2026 Oklahoma wildfires	
First Point	Florida	Okeechobee, Glades	8,612	February 12	February 13	2026 Florida wildfires – Caused dense smoke throughout the Miami Metropolitan Area.	
Levy	Florida	Osceola	1,300	February 15	February 15	2026 Florida wildfires	
County Road 89	Colorado	Morgan, Weld	1,089	February 17	February 17	2026 Colorado wildfires	
County Road 169 Highway 24	Colorado	Elbert, Lincoln	5,599	February 17	February 18	2026 Colorado wildfires	
Smith	New Mexico	Harding	3,797	February 17	February 20	2026 New Mexico wildfires	
43 Road	Oklahoma	Woodward	1,680	February 17	February 22	2026 Oklahoma wildfires - Caused evacuations for the city of Woodward.	
Side Road	Oklahoma	Texas	3,680	February 17	February 22	2026 Oklahoma wildfires	
Ranger Road	Oklahoma, Kansas	Beaver (OK), Harper (OK), Clark (KS), Comanche (KS), Meade (KS)	283,283	February 17	February 24	2026 Oklahoma wildfires, 2026 Kansas wildfires – Caused evacuation orders for the communities of Englewood and Ashland in Kansas. Four firefighters were injured.	
Stevens	Oklahoma, Kansas	Texas (OK), Seward (KS), Stevens (KS)	12,428	February 17	February 23	2026 Oklahoma wildfires, 2026 Kansas wildfires - Caused evacuations for the community of Tyrone. At least 5 structures were destroyed.	
8 Ball	Texas	Armstrong, Donley	13,564	February 17	February 21	2026 Texas wildfires - Caused evacuations for the community of Howardwick.	
Lavender	Texas	Oldham, Potter	18,423	February 17	February 22	2026 Texas wildfires – Caused evacuations for the community of Boys Ranch. One home and two shops were destroyed.	
Tennis	Kansas	Finney	5,000	February 17	February 20	2026 Kansas wildfires	
Andrew Lane	Kansas	Meade, Seward	7,217	February 17	March 2	2026 Kansas wildfires	
Poor Farm	Oklahoma	Pittsburg, Latimer	9,565	February 19	February 23	2026 Oklahoma wildfires	
Tiger Tank	Mississippi	Perry	1,800	February 19	February 19	2026 Mississippi wildfires	
Cluster	Louisiana	Winn	1,122	February 20	February 23	2026 Louisiana wildfires	
Range 6	Mississippi	Perry	3,525	February 22	March 11	2026 Mississippi wildfires	
National	Florida	Collier	35,027	February 22	March 17	2026 Florida wildfires - Human-caused in Big Cypress National Preserve. Caused dense smoke across South Florida, leading to the temporary closure of Alligator Alley.	
Dahlberg	Colorado	Douglas	1,081	February 24	February 24	2026 Colorado wildfires	
Cypress Creek Wilderness	Texas	Angelina, Jasper	6,754	February 24	March 9	2026 Texas wildfires	
Nebo Mountain	Texas	Gillespie	1,160	February 24	February 25	2026 Texas wildfires	
113	Colorado	Logan	5,125	February 25	February 25	2026 Colorado wildfires	
Radar	Florida	Polk	2,000	February 26	February 27	2026 Florida wildfires	
Rehder Creek	Montana	Musselshell	5,060	February 26	March 1	2026 Montana wildfires - Evacuation orders in Roundup and surrounding areas.	
Doke Number Two	Oklahoma	Atoka	2,477	February 27	March 2	2026 Oklahoma wildfires	
Savannah	Florida	Liberty	1,930	March 3	March 27	2026 Florida wildfires	
Rawlins Co TP	Kansas	Rawlins	1,521	March 3	March 3	2026 Kansas wildfires	
Dolly	Texas	Swisher	1,533	March 3	March 3	2026 Texas wildfires	
Helen	New Mexico	Mora	1,132	March 3	March 23	2026 New Mexico wildfires - Closed State Road 120.	
East Tower	North Carolina	Dare	1,410	March 4	March 11		
Old Bowling Green	Florida	Polk	3,297	March 5	March 12	2026 Florida wildfires	
Porcupine Creek	Wyoming	Campbell	2,490	March 9	March 10	2026 Wyoming wildfires - Caused evacuations for the town of Wright.	
Cabin Creek	Texas	Gray	7,000	March 9	March 11	2026 Texas wildfires	
Yellow	Texas	Hartley, Moore, Oldham	14,374	March 10	March 13	2026 Texas wildfires	
Road 203	Nebraska	Blaine, Thomas	35,892	March 12	March 25	2026 Nebraska wildfires – A wildfire burned within the Nebraska National Forest. Three unoccupied firefighting vehicles were burned and destroyed.	
Anderson Bridge	Nebraska	Cherry	17,400	March 12	March 23	2026 Nebraska wildfires – At least one home and several outbuildings were damaged.	
Qury	South Dakota	Custer	9,168	March 12	May 4	2026 South Dakota wildfires - Caused evacuations for Custer. Approximately 10 properties were affected with structures being either damaged or destroyed.	
Morrill	Nebraska	Morrill, Garden, Arthur, Keith, Grant	642,029	March 12	March 24	2026 Nebraska wildfires - The largest documented wildfire in Nebraska's history caused evacuations for Lewellen and areas around Lake McConaughy. The fire ran over 100 miles in a single day and destroyed numerous structures. The fire started from an electrical fire sparked by high winds. One fatality occurred.	
Cottonwood	Nebraska	Dawson, Lincoln	129,253	March 12	March 27	2026 Nebraska wildfires - Caused evacuations for Farnam and surrounding areas. Second largest recorded wildfire in Nebraska state history. At least 44 structures were destroyed.	
Yearling Pasture	Oklahoma	Osage	5,039	March 13	April 3	2026 Oklahoma wildfires	
Five	Oklahoma	Osage	1,960	March 14	March 21	2026 Oklahoma wildfires	
Range 121	Colorado	El Paso	1,100	March 15	March 16	2026 Colorado wildfires – Burned on Fort Carson.	
Salt Fork	Oklahoma	Greer, Jackson	3,327	March 15	March 18	2026 Oklahoma wildfires	
Neon Beige	Texas	Oldham	1,688	March 15	March 16	2026 Texas wildfires	
139	Florida	Liberty	6,499	March 17	May 6	2026 Florida wildfires	
Nineteen	Colorado	El Paso	1,600	March 18	March 19	2026 Colorado wildfires – Burned on Fort Carson.	
24	Colorado	El Paso, Fremont, Pueblo	7,405	March 18	April 2	2026 Colorado wildfires – Burned partially on Fort Carson. Closed and prompted several evacuations near State Highway 115 for multiple days.	
Sunset	Louisiana	Winn	1,000	March 18	March 19	2026 Louisiana wildfires	
Rattlesnake Hollow	Oklahoma	McIntosh	1,027	March 18	March 23	2026 Oklahoma wildfires	
Drummond	Oklahoma	Osage	5,000	March 18	April 3	2026 Oklahoma wildfires	
Armstrong Oaks	Texas	Brooks, Kenedy	2,245	March 19	March 21	2026 Texas wildfires	
Mill Pond	Florida	Liberty	1,760	March 19	May 6	2026 Florida wildfires	
March	Montana	Powder River	2,268	March 20	March 22	2026 Montana wildfires	
Sandpiper	Wyoming	Converse, Natrona	6,287	March 20	March 21	2026 Wyoming wildfires	
Sand Creek	Oklahoma	Osage	6,897	March 20	March 28	2026 Oklahoma wildfires	
Gray Road	Kansas	Butler	1,279	March 21	March 24	2026 Kansas wildfires	
Burgess East	Alabama	Clay	1,020	March 21	March 23	2026 Alabama wildfires	
Kane	Wyoming	Big Horn	1,915	March 21	March 29	2026 Wyoming wildfires	
Sunshine Hollow	Oklahoma	Pushmataha	1,600	March 22	March 24	2026 Oklahoma wildfires	
Woodbury Road	South Carolina	Marion	1,750	March 22	May 4		
Pumpkin Hollow	Oklahoma	Adair, Cherokee	1,129	March 23	March 27	2026 Oklahoma wildfires	
Oxbow	Oklahoma	Okfuskee	2,068	March 23	March 26	2026 Oklahoma wildfires	
Middle Creek	Oklahoma	Hughes, McIntosh	1,935	March 23	March 27	2026 Oklahoma wildfires	
Luna Branch	Oklahoma	Adair	1,279	March 23	March 27	2026 Oklahoma wildfires	
Sonny Glle	Oklahoma	Adair	1,222	March 23	March 27	2026 Oklahoma wildfires	
Hutchinson	Texas	Hutchinson	2,937	March 24	March 27	2026 Texas wildfires	
Iron Post	Oklahoma	Cherokee	1,309	March 24	March 28	2026 Oklahoma wildfires	
Ware	Oklahoma	Osage	2,271	March 24	April 14	2026 Oklahoma wildfires	
Paramount	California	Kern, Kings	1,280	March 25	March 25	2026 California wildfires	
Salt	Kansas	Rice, Stafford	1,075	March 26	March 30	2026 Kansas wildfires	
Ashby	Nebraska	Grant, Garden	36,005	March 26	April 2	2026 Nebraska wildfires - Caused evacuations for Ashby. At least two homes were destroyed.	
Minor	Nebraska	Grant	14,082	March 26	April 1	2026 Nebraska wildfires - Caused evacuations for Hyannis.	
Zipperer	Oklahoma	Pittsburg, Latimer	1,216	March 26	March 27	2026 Oklahoma wildfires	
Box	Oklahoma	Osage	2,486	March 26	April 3	2026 Oklahoma wildfires	
Hall Thompson Lane	Alabama	Shelby	2,500	March 27	April 13	2026 Alabama wildfires	
Big Toe	Oklahoma	Pittsburg	1,256	March 27	March 31	2026 Oklahoma wildfires	
Big Hungry	Mississippi	Carroll	4,246	March 27	March 31	2026 Mississippi wildfires	
Old 66	New Mexico	Quay	3,668	March 27	March 31	2026 New Mexico wildfires	
Bronson	Iowa	Woodbury	3,500	March 28	March 29	Caused one injury and destroyed two homes. A county bridge and an estimated to 15-20 outbuildings were also burnt.	
Boman	Oklahoma	Osage	1,810	March 28	April 3	2026 Oklahoma wildfires	
Lamar Bennett Trail	Georgia	Ware	1,075	March 29	March 30	2026 Georgia wildfires	
Lefty	Texas	Hall	1,359	April 2	April 4	2026 Texas wildfires	
Sargent	Florida, Georgia	Baker (FL), Columbia (FL), Clinch (GA)	2,523	April 2	June 3	2026 Florida wildfires, 2026 Georgia wildfires – Burned west of Rockvil along State Road 2. Large pyrocumulus cloud was produced.	
Springs	California	Riverside	4,176	April 3	April 8	2026 California wildfires – Caused evacuations for the city of Moreno Valley.	
Williams Creek	Alabama	Chilton, Perry	1,650	April 4	April 15	2026 Alabama wildfires	
Meadow View	Texas	Potter	1,262	April 6	April 8	2026 Texas wildfires	
Sunny	Oklahoma	Osage	1,837	April 8	April 16	2026 Oklahoma wildfires	
HC 1	New Mexico	San Miguel	1,415	April 8	April 9	2026 New Mexico wildfires	
Hughey	Oklahoma	Osage	1,391	April 9	April 10	2026 Oklahoma wildfires	
Lightning Roll	Oklahoma	Beaver	2,412	April 9	April 12	2026 Oklahoma wildfires	
Red	Texas	Hartley, Oldham	3,000	April 9	April 13	2026 Texas wildfires	
Purple Monster	Texas	Oldham	1,911	April 9	April 11	2026 Texas wildfires	
Rafey	Alabama	Mobile	1,810	April 11	April 30	2026 Alabama wildfires	
79	South Dakota	Custer	5,408	April 11	April 14	2026 South Dakota wildfires	
Schwachheim	Colorado	Las Animas	1,582	April 12	April 24	2026 Colorado wildfires	
Alum	Kentucky	McCreary	1,100	April 12	April 30		
Highway 36	Colorado	Yuma	1,000	April 13	April 13	2026 Colorado wildfires	
Newman Drive	Florida	Collier	1,733	April 13	April 22	2026 Florida wildfires – Caused evacuations for portions of Naples.	
Smoke Show	Mississippi	Perry	4,896	April 13	April 17	2026 Mississippi wildfires	
Arkansas River	Kansas	Edwards	1,000	April 16	April 16	2026 Kansas wildfires	
Pineland Road	Georgia	Clinch, Echols	32,031	April 18	June 10	2026 Georgia wildfires – Caused evacuations for the community of Fruitland. At least 35 homes have been destroyed.	
Neon White	Texas	Dickens	1,240	April 18	April 19	2026 Texas wildfires	
Tumey	California	Fresno	1,647	April 19	April 21	2026 California wildfires	
Railroad/Crews Road	Florida	Clay, Putnam	4,796	April 19	May 29	2026 Florida wildfires – Led to evacuations for areas to the north of Bostwick. Led to the closure of West Tocoi Road.	
Highway 82	Georgia	Brantley	22,420	April 20	June 10	2026 Georgia wildfires – At least 87 structures have been destroyed.	
East Side	Montana	Carbon	1,219	April 20	May 19	2026 Montana wildfires	
MM-45	Florida	Broward	9,600	April 21	April 24	2026 Florida wildfires	
Cow Creek	Florida	Levy	2,364	April 21	May 29	2026 Florida wildfires – An outbuilding was destroyed. Caused widespread evacuations in Central Levy County near the Goethe State Forest.	
Lone Pine	Minnesota	Becker	1,500	April 22	April 27		
Pressey	Nebraska	Custer	9,141	April 22	May 4	2026 Nebraska wildfires	
Thomas Ranch	South Dakota	Sully	1,800	April 22	April 23	2026 South Dakota wildfires	
Taber Rec	South Dakota	Bon Homme	1,573	April 22	April 26	2026 South Dakota wildfires	
Hammer	Colorado	El Paso	4,958	April 22	April 24	2026 Colorado wildfires – Prompted evacuations for Hanover and closed schools in Hanover School District 28.	
Bauman	South Dakota	Jackson	3,178	April 22	May 4	2026 South Dakota wildfires	
Daly	Nebraska	McPherson	5,173	April 22	April 24	2026 Nebraska wildfires	
Vasa	Nebraska	Arthur	2,100	April 22	98%	2026 Nebraska wildfires	
Peterson	Nebraska	Holt	1,000	April 22	May 6	2026 Nebraska wildfires	
Hummingbird	New Mexico	Catron	5,716	April 22	June 4	2026 New Mexico wildfires – Prompted evacuations in the Gila Wilderness and Willow Creek subdivision.	
Fb 17	South Dakota	Todd	1,188	April 23	May 3	2026 South Dakota wildfires	
Poitrey Canyon	Colorado	Las Animas	2,113	April 24	May 3	2026 Colorado wildfires	
HWY 41	Florida	Miami-Dade	9,149	April 27	May 3	2026 Florida wildfires – Closed parts of Everglades National Park.	
Sparks	New Mexico	Quay	6,000	April 28	May 1	2026 New Mexico wildfires	
Crow Creek	New Mexico	Colfax	1,200	April 29	April 30	2026 New Mexico wildfires – Closed U.S. Route 64.	
Pine Mountain	Oregon	Deschutes	2,589	May 1	May 11	Started from an escaped prescribed burn.	
Hazen	Arizona	Maricopa	1,191	May 2	May 15	2026 Arizona wildfires	
Guide	South Dakota	Oglala Lakota	1,104	May 2	May 7	2026 South Dakota wildfires	
Tower	California	Kern	2,469	May 3	May 5	2026 California wildfires	
South Canal	Florida	Lafayette	2,265	May 4	August 5	2026 Florida wildfires	
311 Konza	Kansas	Geary	1,446	May 4	May 4	2026 Kansas wildfires	
Canyon	California	Kern	2,278	May 7	May 12	2026 California wildfires	
Max Road Miramar	Florida	Broward, Miami-Dade	11,446	May 10	May 13	2026 Florida wildfires	
Highway 24	Washington	Grant	3,067	May 10	May 14	2026 Washington wildfires	
Neuralia	California	Kern	1,196	May 13	May 16	2026 California wildfires	
Pasadena Valley	Idaho	Elmore	1,729	May 13	May 14	2026 Idaho wildfires	
Jericho Creek	Montana	Powell, Lewis and Clark	2,068	May 13	June 3	2026 Montana wildfires	
Wild Horse	Utah	Millard, Juab	7,025	May 13	May 19	2026 Utah wildfires	
Rochelle 2	Wyoming	Campbell, Converse	1,318	May 13	May 20	2026 Wyoming wildfires	
Ash Pole	Nebraska	Dawes	1,028	May 14	May 20	2026 Nebraska wildfires	
51	Kansas	Morton	12,840	May 14	May 24	2026 Kansas wildfires	
Seven Cabins	New Mexico	Lincoln	31,860	May 14	June 11	2026 New Mexico wildfires – Sparked by fatal medical plane crash, prompted evacuations near Pine Lodge and areas northwest. was Burning in the Capitan Mountains Wilderness.	
Mimms	New Mexico	Quay	7,093	May 14	May 29	2026 New Mexico wildfires – Lightning-caused.	
Range	New Mexico	Roosevelt	2,817	May 14	May 17	2026 New Mexico wildfires	
Range	California	Monterey	8,000	May 14	May 15	2026 California wildfires – Burned on Camp Roberts.	
Hunggate	Texas	Randall, Deaf Smith	34,132	May 14	May 19	2026 Texas wildfires – Caused evacuations for portions of Canyon. Three homes and several outbuildings were destroyed. A trestle bridge belonging to BNSF Railway also was destroyed, temporarily putting the Plainview Subdivision line out of service.	
Meade Lake Complex	Kansas	Meade	92,733	May 14	May 20	2026 Kansas wildfires – Consisted of the Meade Co Complex 1 & 2 fires, Proffitt Lake Fire, Lexington Fire and 2 other fires.	
Shifty	Texas	Potter	5,277	May 14	May 15	2026 Texas wildfires	
Line	New Mexico, Texas	Quay (NM), Hartley (TX), Oldham (TX)	30,144	May 14	May 29	2026 New Mexico wildfires, 2026 Texas wildfires – Lightning-caused. Caused evacuations for the community of Nara Visa.	
McBride	Texas	Carson	2,192	May 14	May 14	2026 Texas wildfires	
Crooked Cook	Texas	Motley	1,388	May 14	May 15	2026 Texas wildfires	
Roman	Texas	Hartley	6,294	May 14	May 16	2026 Texas wildfires	
Rowlee	California	Kern, Tulare	2,520	May 14	May 15	2026 California wildfires	
State Line	Oklahoma, Colorado	Cimarron (OK), Baca (CO)	1,897	May 14	May 15	2026 Oklahoma wildfires, 2026 Colorado wildfires	
Tex-Ok	Oklahoma	Cimarron	23,884	May 14	May 19	2026 Oklahoma wildfires – Lightning-caused.	
Santa Rosa Island	California	Santa Barbara	18,379	May 15	June 4	2026 California wildfires	
Wolf Canyon	Kansas, Oklahoma	Meade (KS), Seward (KS), Beaver (OK)	6,822	May 15	May 18	2026 Kansas wildfires, 2026 Oklahoma wildfires	
Cherokee	Texas	Briscoe	3,222	May 15	May 15	2026 Texas wildfires	
Western	Texas	Randall	1,137	May 15	May 16	2026 Texas wildfires	
Ox Bow	Texas	Hall	1,014	May 15	May 16	2026 Texas wildfires	
Chainey Mountain	Texas	Hall	1,202	May 15	May 16	2026 Texas wildfires	
Rita Blanca Unit 32	Texas	Dallam	8,907	May 15	May 16	2026 Texas wildfires	
Comanche	Texas	Cottle, Hall, Motley	1,991	May 15	May 17	2026 Texas wildfires	
Ballard	Oklahoma, Colorado	Cimarron (OK), Baca (CO)	18,323	May 15	May 19	2026 Oklahoma wildfires, 2026 Colorado wildfires – Lightning-caused.	
Flanders	Minnesota	Crow Wing	1,685	May 16	May 20	Caused evacuations for the community of Mission.	
Sharpe	Oklahoma, Colorado	Cimarron (OK), Baca (CO)	29,559	May 16	May 21	2026 Oklahoma wildfires, 2026 Colorado wildfires – Caused evacuations for the town of Campo.	
Herman Ranch Complex	Kansas	Clark	35,455	May 17	90%	2026 Kansas wildfires – Caused evacuations for the city of Ashland. Consists of the Herman Ranch & Bouziden Ranch fires.	
Black Mesa Trail	New Mexico, Oklahoma	Union (NM), Cimarron (OK)	1,515	May 17	May 23	2026 New Mexico wildfires, 2026 Oklahoma wildfires	
Stinky	Texas	Potter	2,335	May 17	May 21	2026 Texas wildfires	
River	California	Kern	3,535	May 18	May 22	2026 California wildfires	
Sandy	California	Ventura	2,183	May 18	May 27	2026 California wildfires – Caused evacuations for the city of Simi Valley.	
Sailor Cap	Idaho	Owyhee	8,292	May 18	May 19	2026 Idaho wildfires	
Kress	Texas	Swisher	1,551	May 18	May 19	2026 Texas wildfires	
Bain	California	Riverside	1,497	May 19	May 29	2026 California wildfires – Damaged five structures, destroyed one, and caused five injuries in Jurupa Valley and Norco	
Trigg	New Mexico	San Miguel	2,000	May 21	95%	2026 New Mexico wildfires	
Shell	Florida	Lake	2,822	May 22	July 16	2026 Florida wildfires – Lightning-caused.	
Mile Marker 44	Florida	Broward	1,200	May 23	May 26	2026 Florida wildfires	
Wawa 2	Florida	Highlands, Polk	7,121	May 23	June 9	2026 Florida wildfires	
340	Florida	Wakulla	3,255	May 23	June 16	2026 Florida wildfires	
Quartz	Nevada	Pershing	2,448	May 23	May 27	2026 Nevada wildfires	
Moore	Idaho	Ada	1,399	May 23	May 23	2026 Idaho wildfires	
Kinyon Springs	Idaho	Owyhee	1,573	May 25	May 26	2026 Idaho wildfires	
Zen	Oregon	Wasco	1,634	May 25	May 29	2026 Oregon wildfires	
Dewoff	Idaho	Blaine	2,078	May 25	May 26	2026 Idaho wildfires	
Black Ridge	Idaho	Lincoln	1,500	May 25	May 26	2026 Idaho wildfires	
Summit Creek	Idaho	Cassia	1,877	May 25	June 15	2026 Idaho wildfires – Caused by lightning.	
Bradshaw	Montana	Powder River	2,689	May 26	May 31	2026 Montana wildfires	
Anticline	Montana	Wibaux	1,217	May 28	May 31	2026 Montana wildfires	
Border 6	California, Baja California	San Diego (CA), Tijuana (BCN)	1,516	June 2	June 6	2026 California wildfires	
Kopshesut	Alaska	Northwest Arctic	1,448	June 4	June 15	2026 Alaska wildfires	
Hwy 24	Washington	Yakima	5,918	June 4	June 5	2026 Washington wildfires	
Waltz	California	Mariposa, Merced	1,644	June 5	June 8	2026 California wildfires	
Macy	California	Los Angeles, Kern	2,000	June 5	June 7	2026 California wildfires	
Blue Ridge	Idaho	Owyhee	14,317	June 5	June 6	2026 Idaho wildfires	
Michaud Creek	Idaho	Bannock, Power	1,560	June 5	June 7	2026 Idaho wildfires	
Frontage	Oregon	Baker	1,938	June 6	June 7	2026 Oregon wildfires	
Butte/Chestnut	Washington	Chelan	1,089	June 6	June 8	2026 Washington wildfires	
Raven Creek	Wyoming	Campbell, Weston	4,246	June 6	June 12	2026 Wyoming wildfires	
Tower	Utah	Millard	1,369	June 7	June 15	2026 Utah wildfires	
South Mountain	Utah	Tooele	1,865	June 8	June 13	2026 Utah wildfires	
South Fork	Nebraska	Dawes, Sioux	39,696	June 9	June 24	2026 Nebraska wildfires – Caused evacuations for the city of Crawford.	
Bear	New Mexico	Catron	7,769	June 9	June 22	2026 New Mexico wildfires – Lightning-caused.	
Canyon	Alaska	Yukon-Koyukuk	1,064	June 11	September 17	2026 Alaska wildfires	
Kilolitna	Alaska	Yukon-Koyukuk	4,526	June 12	0%	2026 Alaska wildfires	
Wyly	California	Kern	1,075	June 13	June 16	2026 California wildfires	
Highway 730	Oregon, Washington	Umatilla (OR), Walla Walla (WA)	8,262	June 13	June 17	2026 Washington wildfires	
Juniper Dunes	Washington	Franklin	13,003	June 13	June 18	2026 Washington wildfires	
Rookery	Florida	Volusia	4,700	June 14	July 6	2026 Florida wildfires – Lightning-caused.	
Tule	Washington	Yakima	24,090	June 14	June 29	2026 Washington wildfires	
Shore	California	Riverside	3,085	June 15	June 25	2026 California wildfires	
Rock Canyon	Arizona	Coconino	4,823	June 15	July 6	2026 Arizona wildfires – Lightning-caused.	
Mateo	California	San Diego	1,377	June 15	June 19	2026 California wildfires – Burned in Camp Pendleton.	
Chalk	Idaho	Elmore	1,206	June 15	June 16	2026 Idaho wildfires	
Quarry 2	Florida	Miami-Dade	19,018	June 15	July 9	2026 Florida wildfires	
Sycamore	Arizona	Gila	11,938	June 15	July 10	2026 Arizona wildfires – Lightning-caused.	
Highway 17	Washington	Grant	1,300	June 16	June 17	2026 Washington wildfires	
Old Emigrant	Oregon	Umatilla	1,425	June 16	June 21	2026 Oregon wildfires	
Sawmill	Utah	Iron	3,790	June 16	July 1	2026 Utah wildfires	
Tucannon	Washington	Columbia, Garfield	8,069	June 16	June 20	2026 Washington wildfires	
Kartar	Washington	Okanogan	11,746	June 16	July 1	2026 Washington wildfires	
Well	Florida	Miami-Dade	2,814	June 16	July 17	2026 Florida wildfires	
Roza	Washington	Kittitas, Yakima	3,536	June 16	June 25	2026 Washington wildfires	
Grapevine	Nevada	Lincoln	26,464	June 17	July 17	2026 Nevada wildfires – Lightning-caused. Burned in Clover Mountain Wilderness Area and showed extreme fire behavior. Prompting level one evacuations in Washington County, Utah and closed Beaver Dam State Park.	
Median	Idaho	Gooding	4,060	June 17	June 18	2026 Idaho wildfires	
School Lands	Oklahoma	Woods, Woodward	2,411	June 17	June 21	2026 Oklahoma wildfires – Lightning-caused.	
Kane Springs	Nevada	Lincoln	17,042	June 17	July 13	2026 Nevada wildfires – Lightning-caused.	
Coptic	Florida	Miami-Dade	5,685	June 17	June 21	2026 Florida wildfires	
Lost	California	Kern	7,834	June 18	June 21	2026 California wildfires	
Bear	Alaska	Denali	3,409	June 19	September 8	2026 Alaska wildfires	
Pocket	Arizona	Coconino, Yavapai	27,393	June 19	July 30	2026 Arizona wildfires – Burning 7 miles north of Sedona in Oak Creek Canyon on the Coconino National Forest. Caused evacuations for Oak Creek Canyon between Sedona and Forest Highlands.	
Iron	Utah	Utah, Juab, Tooele	41,842	June 19	July 3	2026 Utah wildfires – Caused evacuations for Eureka.	
Shyster	Nevada	Humboldt	2,186	June 20	June 22	2026 Nevada wildfires – Lightning-caused.	
Mary	Idaho	Owyhee	1,200	June 20	June 21	2026 Idaho wildfires – Lightning-caused.	
Hastings	Utah	Tooele	26,422	June 20	June 26	2026 Utah wildfires	
Dry Creek	Oregon	Malheur	3,205	June 20	June 21	2026 Oregon wildfires – Lightning-caused.	
Shaw	Alaska	Southeast Fairbanks	3,459	June 20	October 7	2026 Alaska wildfires	
Kathul	Alaska	Southeast Fairbanks	3,185	June 20	October 28	2026 Alaska wildfires	
Basin	Oregon	Malheur	1,404	June 20	June 21	2026 Oregon wildfires – Lightning-caused.	
Tatlanika	Alaska	Denali, Yukon-Koyukuk	38,636	June 21	October 6	2026 Alaska wildfires	
Unknown	Oregon	Umatilla	1,300	June 21	0%	2026 Oregon wildfires	
Garred Road	Washington	Grant, Douglas	3,370	June 21	June 25	2026 Washington wildfires	
Lytle	Oregon	Malheur	6,064	June 21	June 26	2026 Oregon wildfires	
Platt Trap	Florida	Glades	2,513	June 21	June 26	2026 Florida wildfires	
Sacaton	New Mexico	Catron	9,861	June 21	July 21	New Mexico wildfires – Lightning-caused.	
Cottonwood	Utah	Beaver, Piute	97,464	June 22	August 31	2026 Utah wildfires – Destroyed 145 structures. Causing evacuations. Impacted Eagle Point. Ran ~60,000 acres in one day.	
Area 2	Florida	Palm Beach	12,000	June 23	July 1	2026 Florida wildfires	
Mud	Alaska	Yukon-Koyukuk	1,788	June 24	September 22	2026 Alaska wildfires	
Kilusiktok	Alaska	Nome	2,251	June 25	October 28	2026 Alaska wildfires	
Doorstep	Alaska	Yukon-Koyukuk	1,605	June 25	August 6	2026 Alaska wildfires	
Allen	Alaska	Yukon-Koyukuk	1,706	June 26	August 7	2026 Alaska wildfires	
Parsnip Peak	Nevada	Lincoln	2,264	June 26	July 17	2026 Nevada wildfires – Lightning-caused.	
Cherry	Utah	Juab, Tooele	34,252	June 26	July 7	2026 Utah wildfires – Grew rapidly after merging with multiple other fires shortly after ignition. Prompting evacuations.	
Peterson	Washington	Klickitat	4,200	June 26	June 27	2026 Washington wildfires	
Wild Goose	Utah	Millard, Sanpete	12,665	June 26	July 19	2026 Utah wildfires – Closed U.S. 50 and prompting evacuations.	
Dry Canyon	Nevada	Lincoln	1,698	June 26	July 13	2026 Nevada wildfires – Lightning-caused.	
Beehive	New Mexico	Rio Arriba	4,728	June 26	July 31	2026 New Mexico wildfires	
Steamboat	Arizona	Pinal, Gila	1,576	June 26	July 1	2026 Arizona wildfires – Prompted evacuation orders for Victory Ranch and Linx Ranch.	
Babylon	Utah	San Juan	107,189	June 26	August 12	2026 Utah wildfires – Closing portions of Manti-La Sal National Forest and grew aggressively to the north, 5 structures destroyed.	
Snyder	Utah, Colorado	Mesa (CO), Grand (UT)	28,264	June 27	July 17	2026 Utah wildfires, 2026 Colorado wildfires – Killed three firefighters on site and injured two, with one passing July 24 from injures sustained in June.	
Ferris	Colorado	Montezuma, Dolores	64,881	June 27	August 6	2026 Colorado wildfires – Merged with Far Draw and Doe Canyon fires on June 28. Prompting evacuations for campgrounds northeast of Pleasant View.	
Gold Mountain	Colorado	Gunnison, Hinsdale, Ouray	39,747	June 28	92%	2026 Colorado wildfires	
Atlantic	Florida	Broward	5,780	June 28	July 1	2026 Florida wildfires – Lightning-caused.	
Willow	Colorado	Lake	7,359	June 28	92%	2026 Colorado wildfires – Forced evacuations west of Leadville.	
Aspen Acres	Colorado	Custer, Huerfano, Pueblo	102,007	June 29	94%	2026 Colorado wildfires – Destroyed 850 structures. Caused over 4,000 evacuations in numerous towns.	
Lambdin	Washington	Walla Walla	12,776	June 29	July 6	2026 Washington wildfires	
Log Road	Nebraska	Sioux	1,526	June 29	July 5	2026 Nebraska wildfires	
Sheep Head	Colorado	Huerfano	1,322	June 29	July 5	2026 Colorado wildfires	
Butterfield Spring	Oregon	Malheur	2,750	July 1	July 2	2026 Oregon wildfires	
Luna	Washington	Whatcom	8,553	July 2	42%	2026 Washington wildfires – Lightning-caused. Burning in North Cascades National Park.	
Ishtalitna	Alaska	Yukon-Koyukuk	1,463	July 4	0%	2026 Alaska wildfires	
Chelan Hills	Washington	Douglas	9,861	July 4	July 10	2026 Washington wildfires – Destroyed at least 100 structures. One fatality.	
Antelope Creek	Oregon	Wasco	1,347	July 4	July 6	2026 Oregon wildfires	
North Cayuse	Oregon	Umatilla	4,887	July 4	September 19	2026 Oregon wildfires	
Dutch Flat	Nevada	Humboldt	15,558	July 5	July 8	2026 Nevada wildfires	
Mora	Idaho	Ada	2,426	July 5	July 6	2026 Idaho wildfires	
Claremont	Idaho	Ada	6,627	July 6	August 3	2026 Idaho wildfires	
Pipeline	California	San Diego	1,065	July 6	July 8	2026 California wildfires – Burned on Camp Pendleton.	
Maze	Idaho	Madison	1,579	July 6	July 8	2026 Idaho wildfires	
Gulch	Idaho	Gem	1,798	July 6	July 7	2026 Idaho wildfires	
3-1 Pit	California	Lassen	1,054	July 7	99%	2026 California wildfires	
Camp	Minnesota	St. Louis, Lake	4,357	July 7	August 28	2026 Minnesota wildfires – Lightning-caused.	
Bear Trap	Minnesota	St. Louis, Lake	30,804	July 7	September 8	2026 Minnesota wildfires – Lightning-caused.	
Thumb	Minnesota	St. Louis	25,015	July 7	September 8	2026 Minnesota wildfires – Lightning-caused.	
Hogatza	Alaska	Yukon-Koyukuk	3,616	July 8	September 17	2026 Alaska wildfires	
Salmon	Oregon	Baker, Grant	1,433	July 8	October 3	2026 Oregon wildfires – Lightning-caused.	
Upper Smith	Idaho	Boundary	4,848	July 8	October 13	2026 Idaho wildfires – Lightning-caused.	
Olive Butte	Oregon	Grant	3,092	July 8	September 15	2026 Oregon wildfires – Lightning-caused.	
Anthony	Oregon	Baker, Union	2,584	July 8	September 9	2026 Oregon wildfires – Lightning-caused.	
Van	California	Mariposa	1,107	July 8	July 11	2026 California wildfires	
Getaway Pens	Texas	Dickens	1,034	July 8	July 12	2026 Texas wildfires	
Sioux	Minnesota	St. Louis	6,833	July 9	September 8	2026 Minnesota wildfires – Lightning-caused.	
Elk	Colorado	Hinsdale	7,257	July 9	90%	2026 Colorado wildfires – Lightning-caused.	
Cusenbarry Draw	Texas	Sutton	1,376	July 9	July 11	2026 Texas wildfires	
Martin	Idaho	Blaine	1,065	July 9	July 10	2026 Idaho wildfires	
B and O	Washington	Okanogan	2,762	July 9	July 25	2026 Washington wildfires	
East Evans Creek	Oregon	Jackson	15,580	July 10	August 21	2026 Oregon wildfires	
Stookey	Utah	Tooele	11,881	July 10	July 30	2026 Utah wildfires – Human-caused. Burning in the Onaqui Mountains west of Last Chance Lakes. Prompting evacuations for recreational areas.	
Summit	California	Los Angeles	2,690	July 10	July 23	2026 California wildfires – Burned into the Angeles National Forest.	
Pistachio	California	Kern	1,301	July 11	July 11	2026 California wildfires	
Elephant	California	Plumas, Sierra, Lassen	13,930	July 11	July 26	2026 California wildfires	
Little Knife	Minnesota	Cook, Lake	4,815	July 12	September 4	2026 Minnesota wildfires – Lightning-caused. Includes two merged fires. Crossed over from Canada.	
18 Mile	Nevada	Elko	1,326	July 12	July 17	2026 Nevada wildfires – Lightning-caused.	
Cow Canyon	Idaho	Oneida	3,998	July 12	July 13	2026 Idaho wildfires	
P-L Gulch	Colorado	Rio Blanco	1,580	July 13	July 25	2026 Colorado wildfires	
Charger 2	Florida	Collier	1,555	July 15	July 18	2026 Oregon wildfires	
Lower Dry Creek	Oregon	Umatilla	8,096	July 15	July 18	2026 Oregon wildfires – Burned near Weston, prompting evacuation of the entire city. One home and multiple structures have been lost. The fire has closed down highways 11 and 204, and cut power to the City of Athena.	
Thorn	California	San Diego	1,234	July 15	July 18	2026 California wildfires	
Porcupine Ridge	Oregon	Gilliam, Sherman	79,225	July 15	July 26	2026 Oregon wildfires – Lightning-caused. Merged with the McInnes & Wilcox fires on July 22. Part of the Hay Creek Complex.	
Camel Hump	Oregon	Wheeler	6,789	July 15	September 11	2026 Oregon wildfires – Lightning-caused. Part of the Rowe Creek Complex.	
Antelope	Oregon	Wasco	2,182	July 15	July 22	2026 Oregon wildfires – Lightning-caused. Part of the Rowe Creek Complex.	
Hopkin	Oregon	Gilliam	11,366	July 15	July 26	2026 Oregon wildfires – Lightning-caused. Part of the Hay Creek Complex.	
Crosswhite	Oregon	Crook, Jefferson, Wasco, Wheeler	355,066	July 15	October 2	2026 Oregon wildfires – Part of the Rowe Creek Complex. Lightning-caused. Burning north of Twickenham and prompting numerous evacuations. Merged with Pats Cabin, Cove Creek, and 059 fires on July 19, Box Springs Fire on July 23, and Green Mountain & Brewer fires on July 27.	
Three Queens	Washington	Kittitas	9,582	July 15	90%	2026 Washington wildfires – Lightning-caused. Burning in the Okanogan-Wenatchee National Forest.	
Neff Jones	Washington	Franklin	7,276	July 16	July 21	2026 Washington wildfires – Lightning-caused.	
Kaiser Canyon	Washington	Ferry, Okanogan	138,293	July 16	September 6	2026 Washington wildfires – Lightning-caused. Burned into the Colville Indian Reservation. Caused evacuations for the town of Nespelem, Washington. Destroyed 24 structures.	
Mile Marker 40	Florida	Broward	6,750	July 16	95%	2026 Florida wildfires	
Little Giant	Washington	Chelan	172,912	July 16	October 29	2026 Washington wildfires – Lightning-caused. Burning in the Okanogan-Wenatchee National Forest. Largest wildfire to occur in Chelan County. At least 35 structures have been lost including 15 homes or cabins and more than twenty outbuildings.	
Lyons Ferry	Washington	Franklin	33,749	July 16	July 21	2026 Washington wildfires – Lightning-caused.	
Royal Lake	Washington	Adams	2,037	July 16	July 22	2026 Washington wildfires – Lightning-caused.	
Hoag	Oregon	Gilliam	50,224	July 16	July 26	2026 Oregon wildfires – Lightning-caused. Merged with the Starvation Point and Lower Rock Creek fires. Part of the Hay Creek Complex. Prompted evacuations and destroyed several structures.	
Paradise	Oregon, Washington	Umatilla (OR), Wallowa (OR), Columbia (WA), Walla Walla (WA)	9,654	July 16	86%	2026 Oregon wildfires – Lightning-caused. Burning in Umatilla National Forest.	
Akawa Butte	Oregon	Jefferson	27,491	July 16	September 3	2026 Oregon wildfires – Lightning-caused. Prompted evacuations.	
Egypt	Oregon	Harney	4,553	July 16	September 4	2026 Oregon wildfires – Lightning-caused.	
Deep Canyon	Oregon	Wasco	8,089	July 16	July 22	2026 Oregon wildfires – Part of the Rowe Creek Complex. Lightning-caused.	
Coyote	Oregon	Crook	17,460	July 16	October 2	2026 Oregon wildfires – Lightning-caused.	
Henry	Oregon	Crook	29,844	July 16	September 30	2026 Oregon wildfires – Lightning-caused.	
Devils Canyon	Washington	Franklin	4,766	July 16	July 21	2026 Washington wildfires – Lightning-caused.	
Hagen	Oregon	Umatilla	61,380	July 16	99%	2026 Oregon wildfires – Lightning-caused.	
Horseshoe	California	San Diego	1,400	July 16	July 17	2026 California wildfires	
Black Ridge 2	Idaho	Lincoln	13,392	July 16	July 17	2026 Idaho wildfires – Lightning-caused.	
Powder River	Oregon	Baker	21,088	July 16	August 14	2026 Oregon wildfires – Lightning-caused.	
Berger	Florida	Palm Beach	19,700	July 17	July 25	2026 Florida wildfires	
Cascade	Idaho	Idaho	7,475	July 17	October 9	2026 Idaho wildfires – Lightning-caused. Burning in the Nez Perce-Clearwater National Forests.	
Ptarmigan	Washington	Okanogan	26,059	July 17	90%	2026 Washington wildfires – Burning in the Pasayten Wilderness.	
Modrite	Washington	Ferry	57,594	July 17	September 3	2026 Washington wildfires – Lightning-caused.	
Border 2	Washington	Whatcom	23,856	July 17	74%	2026 Washington wildfires – Lightning-caused. Burning in the Ross Lake National Recreation Area.	
Burnt Creek	Oregon	Wallowa	4,169	July 17	September 2	2026 Oregon wildfires – Lightning-caused.	
Pow Wah Kee	Washington	Asotin	2,600	July 17	July 20	2026 Washington wildfires	
Bologna	Oregon	Grant	4,509	July 17	September 3	2026 Oregon wildfires – Lightning-caused.	
Biscar	California	Lassen	69,355	July 18	August 1	2026 California wildfires	
Ohio	Idaho	Blaine	2,035	July 18	July 21	2026 Idaho wildfires – Caused by human activity.	
Horse Island	South Carolina	Berkeley	1,012	July 18	August 6		
Grassy Hills	Idaho	Owyhee	2,800	July 18	July 18	2026 Idaho wildfires	
Big Gulch	Colorado	Moffat	1,054	July 19	July 25	2026 Colorado wildfires	
Rock	California	Inyo	12,008	July 20	August 6	2026 California wildfires – Burned partly in the Inyo National Forest.	
Keystone	Colorado	Moffat, Rio Blanco	3,042	July 21	July 28	2026 Colorado wildfires – Lightning-caused.	
Little	California	Alameda	1,007	July 21	July 25	2026 California wildfires	
Fuhr Gulch	Colorado	Moffat	1,650	July 21	July 30	2026 Colorado wildfires	
Cow	Oregon	Malheur	5,997	July 21	July 24	2026 Oregon wildfires – Lightning-caused.	
Little Cottonwood	Nevada	Eureka	1,088	July 21	July 22	2026 Nevada wildfires	
188	Oregon	Malheur	1,500	July 21	July 24	2026 Oregon wildfires – Lightning-caused.	
West Blue Crab	Louisiana	Cameron	2,295	July 22	July 25	2026 Louisiana wildfires	
Little Buck	Oregon	Wasco	43,818	July 23	August 8	2026 Oregon wildfires – Lightning-caused.	
Castle	Oregon	Douglas	3,615	July 22	August 27	2026 Oregon wildfires – Lightning-caused. Burning in Umpqua National Forest.	
Railroad	Washington	Grant	8,216	July 23	July 29	2026 Washington wildfires	
Ten Mile	Oregon	Jefferson	4,834	July 23	July 28	2026 Oregon wildfires – Lightning-caused.	
Cottonwood	Oregon	Gilliam	16,273	July 23	July 28	2026 Oregon wildfires – Part of the Hay Creek Complex. Burning South of Cottonwood Canyon State Park.	
Shingle	Oregon	Wheeler	73,183	July 23	September 29	2026 Oregon wildfires – Lightning-caused. Destroyed 4 structures.	
Big Grass	Oregon, Idaho	Malheur (OR), Owyhee (ID)	578,637	July 23	September 12	2026 Oregon wildfires, 2026 Idaho wildfires – Lightning-caused. Officially became the largest wildfire in Oregon's history and crossed into Idaho. Destroyed at least seven homes and 10 other structures, killed livestock, prompted numerous evacuations, and led Idaho Governor Brad Little to declare a disaster emergency and deploy the Idaho National Guard to assist firefighting efforts.	
Fields	California	Merced	1,280	July 23	July 28	2026 California wildfires	
Bench	Oregon	Jefferson	67,080	July 23	90%	2026 Oregon wildfires - Lightning-caused. Destroyed 6 structures. Merged with the Beachcomb Fire on July 26.	
Stubble	Oregon	Harney	15,673	July 23	93%	2026 Oregon wildfires – Lightning-caused.	
Mount Carmel	Colorado	Baca	2,000	July 23	July 25	2026 Colorado wildfires	
Crowley	Oregon	Malheur	6,073	July 23	July 25	2026 Oregon wildfires – Lightning-caused.	
Bald Mountain	Oregon	Harney, Malheur	76,443	July 23	September 11	2026 Oregon wildfires – Lightning-caused.	
Mouse Meadow	Nevada	Nye	51,408	July 23	September 4	2026 Nevada wildfires – Burning in the Nevada Test and Training Range.	
Duncan	Idaho	Owyhee	16,812	July 23	July 26	2026 Idaho wildfires – Lightning-caused.	
High Lava	Washington	Skamania	2,899	July 23	October 13	2026 Washington wildfires – Lightning-caused. Burning in the Gifford Pinchot National Forest.	
Grandold	Idaho	Elmore	1,011	July 23	July 24	2026 Idaho wildfires	
Fox	Oregon	Baker	78,903	July 23	September 7	2026 Oregon wildfires – Lightning-caused. Destroyed 3 structures.	
Grasshopper	Oregon	Hood River, Wasco	93,971	July 23	98%	2026 Oregon wildfires – Lightning-caused. Burning in the Mount Hood National Forest.	
Brown Ditch	Louisiana	Cameron	2,508	July 24	July 26	2026 Louisiana wildfires	
Tartar	Idaho	Washington	158,027	July 24	September 2	2026 Idaho wildfires – Lightning-caused. Destroyed 8 structures.	
Hopper	Idaho	Owyhee	2,521	July 24	July 26	2026 Idaho wildfires – Lightning-caused.	
Silvertip	Montana	Flathead	7,280	July 24	September 17	2026 Montana wildfires – Lightning-caused. Burning in the Flathead National Forest.	
Hat	Oregon	Malheur	44,122	July 24	August 12	2026 Oregon wildfires – Lightning-caused.	
Elder 1	Montana	Missoula	1,234	July 24	August 5	2026 Montana wildfires – Lightning-caused. Burning in Lolo National Forest.	
Beck	Idaho	Elmore	2,856	July 24	July 25	2026 Idaho wildfires	
Second Flat	Oregon	Harney	105,854	July 24	99%	2026 Oregon wildfires – Lightning-caused.	
Signal Peak	Washington	Yakima	3,047	July 24	July 30	2026 Washington wildfires	
Double Springs	Idaho	Custer	1,779	July 24	October 13	2026 Idaho wildfires – Lightning-caused. Burning in the Salmon-Challis National Forest.	
Peer	Idaho	Owyhee	1,324	July 24	July 27	2026 Idaho wildfires	
Jackass Butte	Oregon	Harney	24,724	July 24	92%	2026 Oregon wildfires – Lightning-caused.	
5-4	California	Inyo	1,965	July 24	August 6	2026 California wildfires – Lightning-caused. part of the Cinder Complex.	
Coleman Creek	Oregon	Harney, Malheur	308,863	July 25	September 11	2026 Oregon wildfires – Lightning-caused. One firefighter was injured and slightly burned while three other firefighters were treated and evaluated for smoke inhalation.	
Quail Springs	Nevada	Lincoln	13,612	July 25	September 4	2026 Nevada wildfires	
Scorp	Idaho	Owyhee	4,765	July 25	July 26	2026 Idaho wildfires – Caused by human activity.	
Pearl Hill	Washington	Douglas	8,052	July 25	July 29	2026 Washington wildfires	
Bradeen Hill	Washington	Stevens	4,417	July 25	August 20	2026 Washington wildfires – Human-caused. Destroyed 3 structures.	
Wolf Creek	Idaho	Idaho	2,643	July 25	October 9	2026 Idaho wildfires – Lightning-caused. Burning in the Nez Perce National Forest.	
Secret Pass	Nevada	Elko	3,300	July 25	August 5	2026 Nevada wildfires – Lightning-caused.	
Gaston	Idaho	Power	1,636	July 25	July 26	2026 Idaho wildfires – Lightning-caused.	
Island	Arizona	La Paz	3,218	July 25	August 11	2026 Arizona wildfires – Burning in the Cibola National Wildlife Refuge.	
Chimney	Nevada	Elko	20,985	July 26	July 31	2026 Nevada wildfires – Lightning-caused.	
New Pass	Nevada	Churchill, Lander	37,899	July 26	August 13	2026 Nevada wildfires – Lightning-caused.	
Ransier	Washington	Yakima	1,330	July 26	August 18	2026 Washington wildfires	
Sinlahekin	Washington	Okanogan	166,007	July 26	October 15	2026 Washington wildfires – Lightning-caused. At least two structures have been damaged.	
Moose	Montana	Granite	6,003	July 26	October 13	2026 Montana wildfires – Caused by lightning. Burning in the Beaverhead–Deerlodge National Forest.	
Kohns	Wyoming	Campbell	2,700	July 27	July 29	2026 Wyoming wildfires	
Fish	California	Kern	4,201	July 27	August 3	2026 California wildfires	
Potato Creek	South Dakota	Jackson, Oglala Lakota	10,944	July 27	August 6	2026 South Dakota wildfires – Lightning-caused.	
Widemouth 2	Utah	Millard, Sevier	129,741	July 27	September 28	2026 Utah wildfires – Lightning-caused. Burning in the Fishlake National Forest.	
Holey	Florida	Broward	5,000	July 28	July 31	2026 Florida wildfires	
Rio Blanco	Colorado	Archuleta	1,388	July 28	August 18	2026 Colorado wildfires	
Skillet	Montana	Flathead, Lincoln	3,414	July 29	September 5	2026 Montana wildfires – Burning in Kootenai National Forest.	
Grotto	Idaho	Idaho	3,856	July 29	October 9	2026 Idaho wildfires – Burning in the Nez Perce National Forest.	
Lake Channel	Idaho	Idaho	2,516	July 29	August 2	2026 Idaho wildfires – Lightning-caused.	
Moose Mountain	Idaho	Clearwater	5,832	July 30	90%	2026 Idaho wildfires – Burning in the Clearwater National Forest.	
Black Canyon	Utah	Emery, Sanpete	3,264	July 30	September 8	2026 Utah wildfires – Burning in the Manti-La Sal National Forest.	
Ward	Nevada	White Pine	8,683	July 31	August 25	2026 Nevada wildfires – Lightning-caused.	
Lumin	Wyoming	Sheridan	7,284	July 31	August 4	2026 Wyoming wildfires	
Bobcat Lakes	Montana	Beaverhead	10,896	July 31	October 29	2026 Montana wildfires – Burning in the Beaverhead–Deerlodge National Forest.	
Big Rock	Idaho	Jefferson, Madison	2,142	July 31	August 13	2026 Idaho wildfires – Lightning-caused.	
Old Trails	Washington	Spokane	3,176	August 1	August 18	2026 Washington wildfires – Destructive fire formed just outside of Spokane, destroying at least 640 structures in the city's northwestern suburbs.	
Sand Creek	Montana	Beaverhead	35,520	September 21	87%	2026 Montana wildfires – Burning in the Beaverhead–Deerlodge National Forest.	
Round Butte	Oregon	Jefferson	1,163	August 1	September 14	2026 Oregon wildfires	
Autumn Lane	Washington	Spokane	5,764	August 1	August 19	2026 Washington wildfires, Spokane complex fires – Human-caused. Destroyed 50 structures.	
Hudspeth	Washington	Stevens	6,726	August 1	August 19	2026 Washington wildfires	
Johnson Canyon	Utah	Box Elder	6,889	August 1	August 4	2026 Utah wildfires	
Eggo	Oregon	Wallowa	4,226	August 1	August 21	2026 Oregon wildfires – Lightning-caused.	
Red Sky	Washington	Yakima	4,283	August 1	August 2	2026 Washington wildfires	
Black Bear	Montana	Ravalli	2,126	August 1	October 15	2026 Montana wildfires – Lightning-caused. Burning in the Bitterroot National Forest.	
Mitre Rock	Washington	Stevens, Lincoln	4,518	August 1	August 10	2026 Washington wildfires – Human-caused. Destroyed 6 structures.	
Antelope Creek	Nevada	Elko	6,282	August 2	August 5	2026 Nevada wildfires	
Middle Coulee	Montana	Chouteau	1,517	August 2	0%	2026 Montana wildfires	
Kimmit	Montana	Hill	1,000	August 2	August 4	2026 Montana wildfires	
Gann	California	Calaveras	10,339	August 3	August 12	2026 California wildfires – Destroyed 48 structures and damaged 3. Caused one civilian fatality.	
Frijoles	New Mexico	Santa Fe	15,956	August 5	October 20	2026 New Mexico wildfires – Lightning-caused.	
Wrights Spring	Oregon	Klamath	55,134	August 5	September 29	2026 Oregon wildfires – Burning in the Winema National Forest.	
Range 39	Mississippi	Perry	2,517	August 5	August 8	2026 Mississippi wildfires	
Slough Grass	Montana	Rosebud	6,467	August 6	August 8	2026 Montana wildfires – Lightning-caused.	
Big Buffalo	Montana	McCone, Dawson	3,597	August 6	August 7	2026 Montana wildfires	
MM115 Hwy 20	Idaho	Elmore	5,070	August 7	August 12	2026 Idaho wildfires – Human-caused.	
Ridge	California	Los Angeles, Kern	1,134	August 7	August 12	2026 California wildfires	
Rocky Canyon	Utah	Morgan, Summit	16,464	August 7	August 31	2026 Utah wildfires – Human-caused.	
Little Goose	Washington	Columbia	7,563	August 8	August 10	2026 Washington wildfires – Caused by human activity.	
MP 18	California	Humboldt	7,599	August 7	September 16	2026 California wildfires – Human-caused.	
Nunamaker Road	Washington	Franklin	20,042	August 8	August 22	2026 Washington wildfires – Human-caused.	
Wells Road	Washington	Spokane, Whitman	1,865	August 8	August 12	2026 Washington wildfires	
Bug	California, Nevada	Lassen (CA), Sierra (CA), Washoe (NV)	93,733	August 8	August 27	2026 California wildfires, 2026 Nevada wildfires – Evacuated over 3,800 residences. Merged with the Fred Mountain Fire on August 11. Destroyed 9 structures and caused one fatality and three injuries.	
Antelope	California	San Luis Obispo, Kern	2,410	August 8	August 11	2026 California wildfires	
South Line	Louisiana	Cameron	5,500	August 8	0%	2026 Louisiana wildfires	
Timber	California	Monterey	25,350	August 8	97%	2026 California wildfires – Burning in the Los Padres National Forest in the Big Sur area in steep terrain.	
EOD	Oklahoma	Comanche	7,234	August 9	August 11	2026 Oklahoma wildfires	
Austin	Oregon	Clackamas	12,888	August 9	98%	2026 Oregon wildfires – Human-caused. Burning in the Mount Hood National Forest.	
Weiser Knoll	Wyoming	Fremont	15,817	August 9	August 18	2026 Wyoming wildfires	
Jones Island	Florida	Volusia	1,107	August 10	August 11	2026 Florida wildfires	
Stallion	Nevada	Washoe	40,691	August 10	August 27	2026 Nevada wildfires – Prompted widespread evacuations.	
Bufford Creek	Texas	Stephens	3,240	August 10	August 14	2026 Texas wildfires	
Cold Springs	Wyoming	Converse	1,966	August 10	August 13	2026 Wyoming wildfires	
Alpowa	Washington	Asotin, Garfield	1,347	August 11	August 14	2026 Washington wildfires	
XU Hill	South Dakota	Oglala Lakota	2,500	August 11	August 29	2026 South Dakota wildfires	
Post	Colorado	Las Animas	4,335	August 11	October 13	2026 Colorado wildfires	
Plains	California	San Luis Obispo, Kern	2,588	August 12	August 13	2026 California wildfires	
Grass Burr	Texas	Cottle	2,623	August 13	August 14	2026 Texas wildfires	
Woodson Creek	Texas	Throckmorton	4,627	August 14	August 16	2026 Texas wildfires	
Sisi	Washington	Chelan	4,687	August 14	40%	2026 Washington wildfires	
Slough Canyon	Utah	Grand	4,774	August 15	95%	2026 Utah wildfires – Lightning-caused.	
Shoshone	Nevada	Churchill	24,513	August 15	August 24	2026 Nevada wildfires – Caused by lightning.	
The H1	Florida	Palm Beach	9,733	August 15	August 20	2026 Florida wildfires – Lightning-caused.	
Bigfoot	Idaho	Ada	1,135	August 15	August 16	2026 Idaho wildfires	
Picture Rock	Oregon	Lake	1,197	August 16	August 28	2026 Oregon wildfires	
Bayou Cumbest	Mississippi	Jackson	1,428	August 16	August 25	2026 Mississippi wildfires	
Mukluk	Alaska	Southeast Fairbanks	7,339	August 17	October 12	2026 Alaska wildfires	
Crooked	Idaho	Boise, Elmore	10,082	August 18	September 18	2026 Idaho wildfires – Human-caused. Burning in the Boise National Forest.	
Alpaugh	California	Tulare	2,664	August 19	August 23	2026 California wildfires	
North Heglar	Idaho	Power, Cassia	1,844	August 19	August 25	2026 Idaho wildfires	
Windmill	Montana	Sweet Grass, Stillwater	4,253	August 19	August 24	2026 Montana wildfires	
Movie Dome	Florida	Miami-Dade	6,207	August 19	August 24	2026 Florida wildfires – Lightning-caused. Burned in Everglades National Park.	
King	Washington	Kittitas	3,465	August 19	72%	2026 Washington wildfires – Burning in the Okanogan-Wenatchee National Forest.	
Deer Creek	Montana	Lincoln	1,099	August 20	October 13	2026 Montana wildfires	
Pine Tree Road	Arkansas	Union	2,102	August 20	August 27		
Chipmunk	Florida	Miami-Dade	17,956	August 21	August 26	2026 Florida wildfires – Lightning-caused. Burned in Everglades National Park.	
Camp Creek	Montana	Lewis and Clark, Powell	9,725	August 21	September 17	2026 Montana wildfires – Lightning-caused. Burning in the Flathead National Forest.	
Colwash	Washington	Benton, Yakima	39,103	August 22	September 3	2026 Washington wildfires – Lightning-caused.	
Casey	Washington	Columbia, Walla Walla	1,000	August 22	August 27	2026 Washington wildfires	
Hawk	Nevada	Washoe	15,067	August 22	September 9	2026 Nevada wildfires – Human-caused. Evacuations prompted for 42,000 residents in Reno and caused large power outages affecting approximately 59,000 residents. Destroyed 46 structures, caused one fatality and six injuries.	
Fraser	Idaho	Elmore	3,980	August 22	August 23	2026 Idaho wildfires – Lightning-caused.	
McCully	Oregon	Baker, Grant	13,604	August 22	91%	2026 Oregon wildfires – Burning in the Whitman National Forest.	
Shale Butte	Idaho	Lincoln	1,691	August 22	August 24	2026 Idaho wildfires – Lightning-caused.	
Rustler	Texas	Motley, Dickens	1,834	August 22	August 24	2026 Texas wildfires – Lightning-caused.	
Silver	Idaho	Boundary	2,594	August 23	October 13	2026 Idaho wildfires – Lightning-caused. Burning in the Kaniksu National Forest.	
Campwood	Arizona	Yavapai	1,215	August 23	September 1	2026 Arizona wildfires	
Parker Lake	Idaho	Boundary	1,531	August 23	October 26	2026 Idaho wildfires	
Mitchell	Georgia	Ware	1,030	August 23	August 28	2026 Georgia wildfires	
Nature Grove	Montana	Ravalli	1,422	August 23	October 15	2026 Montana wildfires	
Rabbit Ear East	New Mexico	Union	1,500	August 24	August 28	2026 New Mexico wildfires	
Ross	Texas	Jack, Palo Pinto	89,989	August 24	September 16	2026 Texas wildfires – Destroyed at least 5 structures.	
Oxley	Nevada	Elko	11,385	August 24	August 31	2026 Nevada wildfires – Lightning-caused.	
Rio Escondido	Texas	Coryell, Hamilton	2,713	August 24	September 2	2026 Texas wildfires	
Tom Creek	Utah	Tooele	4,993	August 24	September 11	2026 Utah wildfires – Lightning-caused.	
Flint	Idaho	Owyhee	6,936	August 24	September 12	2026 Idaho wildfires – Lightning-caused.	
S-1 Vya	Nevada	Washoe	9,692	August 24	September 7	2026 Nevada wildfires	
Wildhorse	Idaho	Blaine, Lincoln	107,562	August 24	August 30	2026 Idaho wildfires – Lightning-caused.	
Sombrero	Nevada	Humboldt	19,204	August 24	August 27	2026 Nevada wildfires	
Tuana Gulch	Idaho	Elmore	3,253	August 24	August 26	2026 Idaho wildfires	
Mitchell Springs	Oregon	Malheur	5,380	August 24	August 29	2026 Oregon wildfires – Lightning-caused.	
Blue Eagle	Nevada	Churchill	9,218	August 25	September 6	2026 Nevada wildfires – Lightning-caused.	
Mustang	Oregon	Malheur	13,379	August 25	August 27	2026 Oregon wildfires – Lightning-caused.	
McConnell Creek	Nevada	Humboldt	33,816	August 25	October 12	2026 Nevada wildfires – Burning in the Humboldt National Forest.	
Plaskett	California	Monterey	29,993	August 26	September 29	2026 California wildfires – Burning in the Los Padres National Forest.	
Calico	Nevada	Humboldt	18,319	August 26	September 10	2026 Nevada wildfires – Burning in the Humboldt National Forest.	
Brushy Canyon	Utah	Box Elder	10,002	August 26	August 31	2026 Utah wildfires	
Coldwater	Idaho	Cassia	1,900	August 27	August 30	2026 Idaho wildfires	
4V	New Mexico	San Miguel	1,000	August 29	September 1	2026 New Mexico wildfires	
McKee Draw	Texas	Edwards	4,495	August 29	September 1	2026 Texas wildfires	
Sandy	Texas	Kenedy, Willacy	2,085	August 29	August 31	2026 Texas wildfires	
Alexander Trail	Oklahoma	Pushmataha	1,669	August 30	September 11	2026 Oklahoma wildfires	
Ruggs	Oregon	Morrow	1,386	August 31	0%	2026 Oregon wildfires	
Snow	Montana	Custer	14,056	September 2	September 7	2026 Montana wildfires	
Needles-Event	South Dakota	Oglala Lakota	6,018	September 4	September 17	2026 South Dakota wildfires	
Moonshine	Wyoming	Albany, Platte	7,325	September 7	October 6	2026 Wyoming wildfires	
Lucas	California	Lake	4,128	September 10	September 20	2026 California wildfires	
Stark	Louisiana	Cameron	1,119	September 10	September 16	2026 Louisiana wildfires	
Woodward	Texas	Schleicher	1,689	September 11	September 12	2026 Texas wildfires	
Sycan	Oregon	Lake	2,185	September 11	September 14	2026 Oregon wildfires	
Star Lake	Texas	Jefferson	16,412	September 11	September 21	2026 Texas wildfires	
Double Barrel	Texas	Trinity	1,315	September 11	September 13	2026 Texas wildfires	
Benson	Texas	Menard	1,382	September 12	September 14	2026 Texas wildfires	
Gracemont	Oklahoma	Caddo	2,692	September 13	October 2	2026 Oklahoma wildfires	
Davis Coulee	Montana	Big Horn	15,470	September 14	September 30	2026 Montana wildfires	
Black Kettle	Oklahoma	Roger Mills	1,527	September 14	September 19	2026 Oklahoma wildfires	
Bunker	Arkansas	Calhoun	2,849	September 14	October 21		
Dome	California	Mariposa	6,788	September 15	October 17	2026 California wildfires	
Dry River	Texas	Sutton	8,943	September 15	September 22	2026 Texas wildfires	
2nd Street	Washington	Benton	1,126	September 25	October 12	2026 Washington wildfires	
Rafter 4B	Texas	Schleicher	2,125	September 26	September 29	2026 Texas wildfires	
Hatch Grade	Oregon, Washington	Walla Walla (WA), Umatilla (OR)	9,521	September 29	October 12	2026 Oregon wildfires, 2026 Washington wildfires	
Bouquet	California	Los Angeles	1,048	September 29	October 12	2026 California wildfires	
Bull	Nevada	Washoe	1,529	October 2	October 15	2026 Nevada wildfires	
PK	Wyoming	Sheridan	1,645	October 9	October 22	2026 Wyoming wildfires	
Buckhorn 2	Idaho	Cassia	2,364	October 10	October 13	2026 Idaho wildfires	
Cooley	California	Mendocino	1,365	October 13	October 31	2026 California wildfires	
Henderson	California	San Diego	3,260	October 15	October 19	2026 California wildfires	
Bee Haven (24 - 06)	Florida	Hamilton	2,060	October 21	85%	2026 Florida wildfires	
201W	Mississippi	Perry	2,700	November 13	November 17	2026 Mississippi wildfires	
Range 47	Mississippi	Forrest	2,379	November 13	75%	2026 Mississippi wildfires	

== See also ==
- Weather of 2026
