= 2026 Minnesota wildfires =

- Part of 2026 United States wildfires
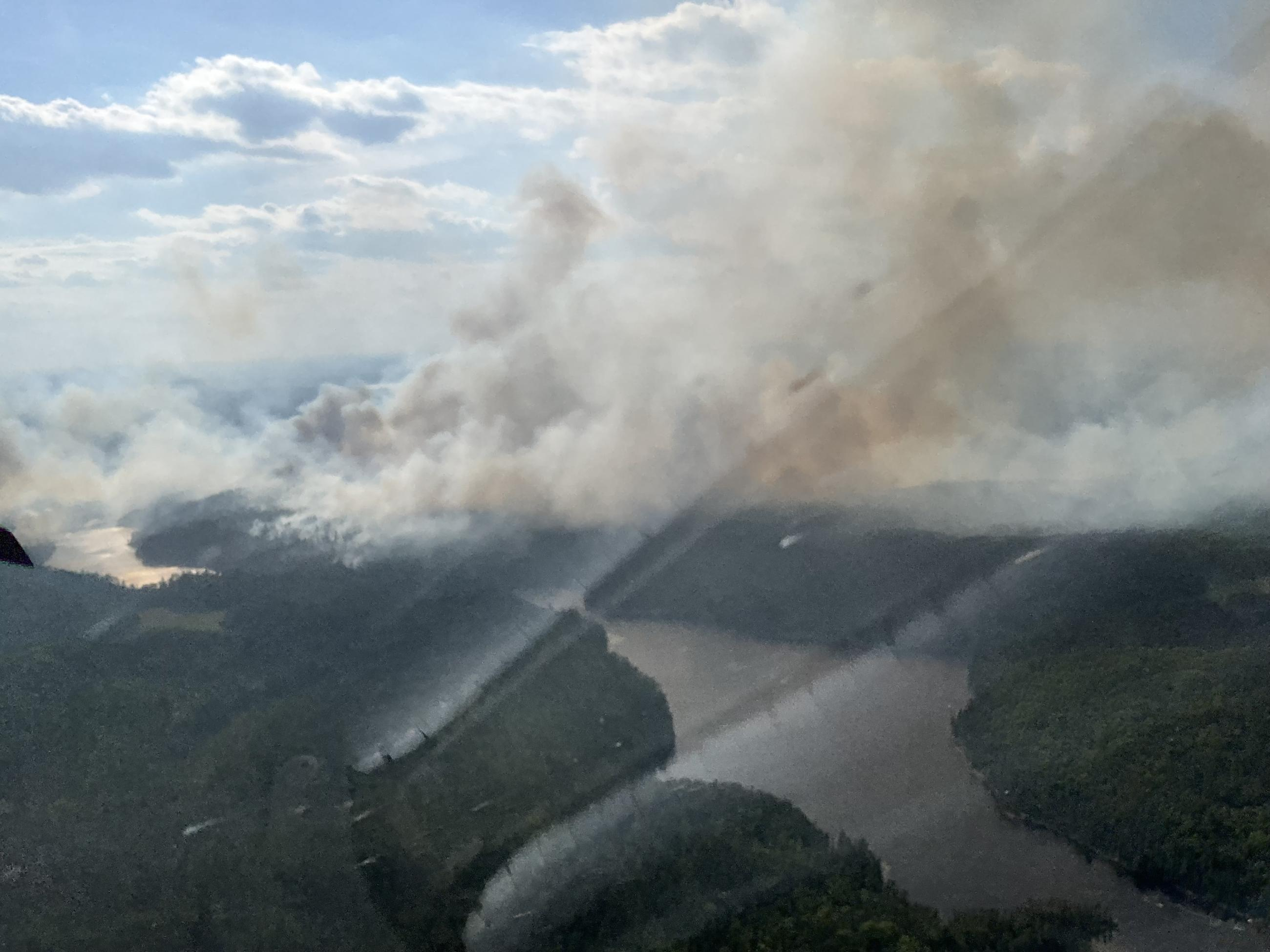
- The Thumb Fire on July 11

Statistics
- Total fires: 16
- Total area: ~74,956

Impacts
- Deaths: 1
- Cost: ~$9,000,000 (Note: In economic loss for affected region)

A series of wildfires have been burning throughout the U.S. state of Minnesota. Minnesota was under a peacetime state of emergency regarding the fires. The state of emergency was originally expended to continue into mid-September of 2026. No official end to the state of emergency was issued after all fires were put out in early October.

The Minnesota fires, combined the 2026 Canadian wildfires have contributed to a day of widespread air quality issues across the Great Lakes region and northern United States into New England. The wildfires and conditions themselves across the region were said to be "unprecedented" by meteorologists and local firefighting agencies.

== Background ==
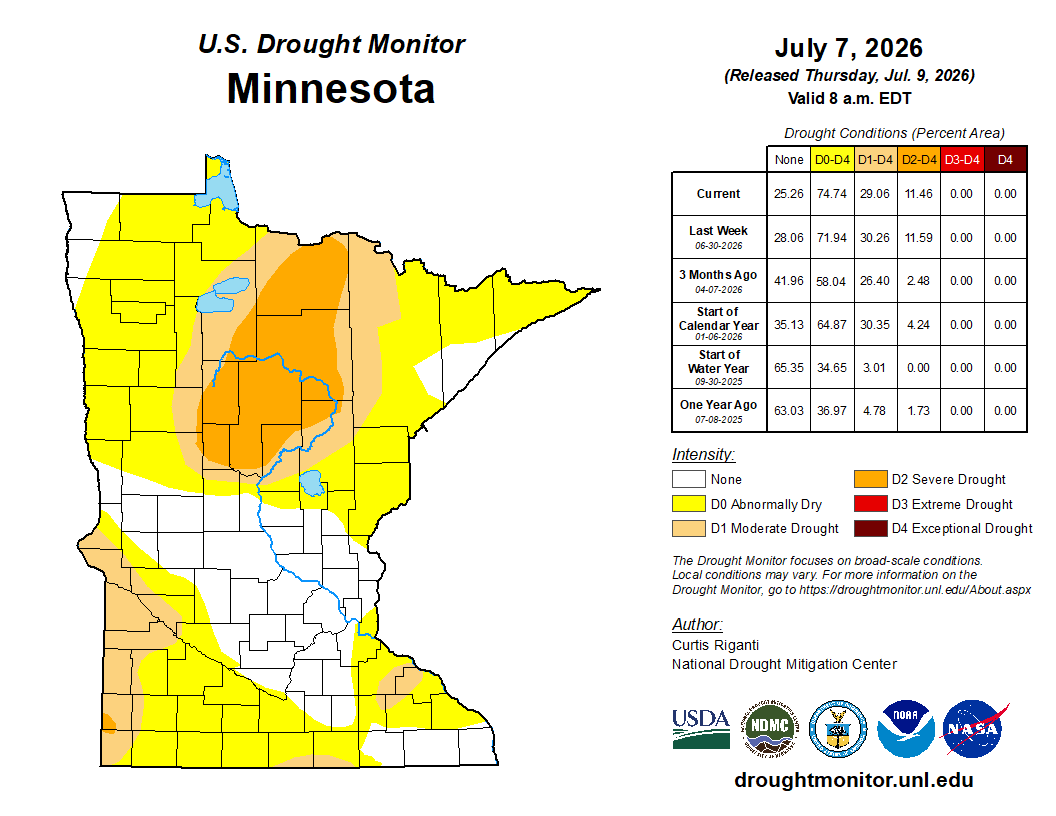
Minnesota drought monitor on July 7

While "fire season" varies every year in Minnesota, most wildfires occur in April and May. On average, over 1,500 wildfires occur each year, and 75% of those occur in those months. However, there is another small peak in fall. This happens when snow melts, so vegetation begins to dry out, and more dry and windy conditions lead to more fire activity. While precipitation can moisten vegetation, it quickly dries up within an hour. Dry winters can make vegetation much more vulnerable to wildfires.

== State of Emergency ==
On July 15, 2026, Minnesota Department of Natural Resources (DNR) Commissioner Sarah Strommen announced that 17 fires were active, and 55,000 acres had been burned. The Minnesota Pollution Control Agency issued an air quality alert the same day, as smoke from the fires spread. An AQI for particulate matter was recorded as high as 617. The maximum normal AQI is 66 and below. The air quality alert remained in effect in much Northern and Eastern Minnesota throughout all of July. On the evening of July 16, 2026, Duluth recorded an AQI of 1030. Effected areas, such as the Boundary Waters, were quickly evacuated and closed to the public.

On July 17, 2026, the Bear Trap fire reached about one mile from public and private buildings, homes, and infrastructure. The Minnesota National Guard is one of multiple organizations fighting the fire. Priority had been forced to shift away from the Thumb fire due to resource constraints. Two new fires were also detected that same day due to over 13,000 lightning strikes from widespread thunderstorm activity, and despite dropping noticeable rain on the fire perimeters, the fires kept raging on. The amount of acres burned also increased by 22,000 in only one day, now reported at greater than 77,000 acres burnt. At that time, it was estimated between 6,000 and 10,000 people have been evacuated.

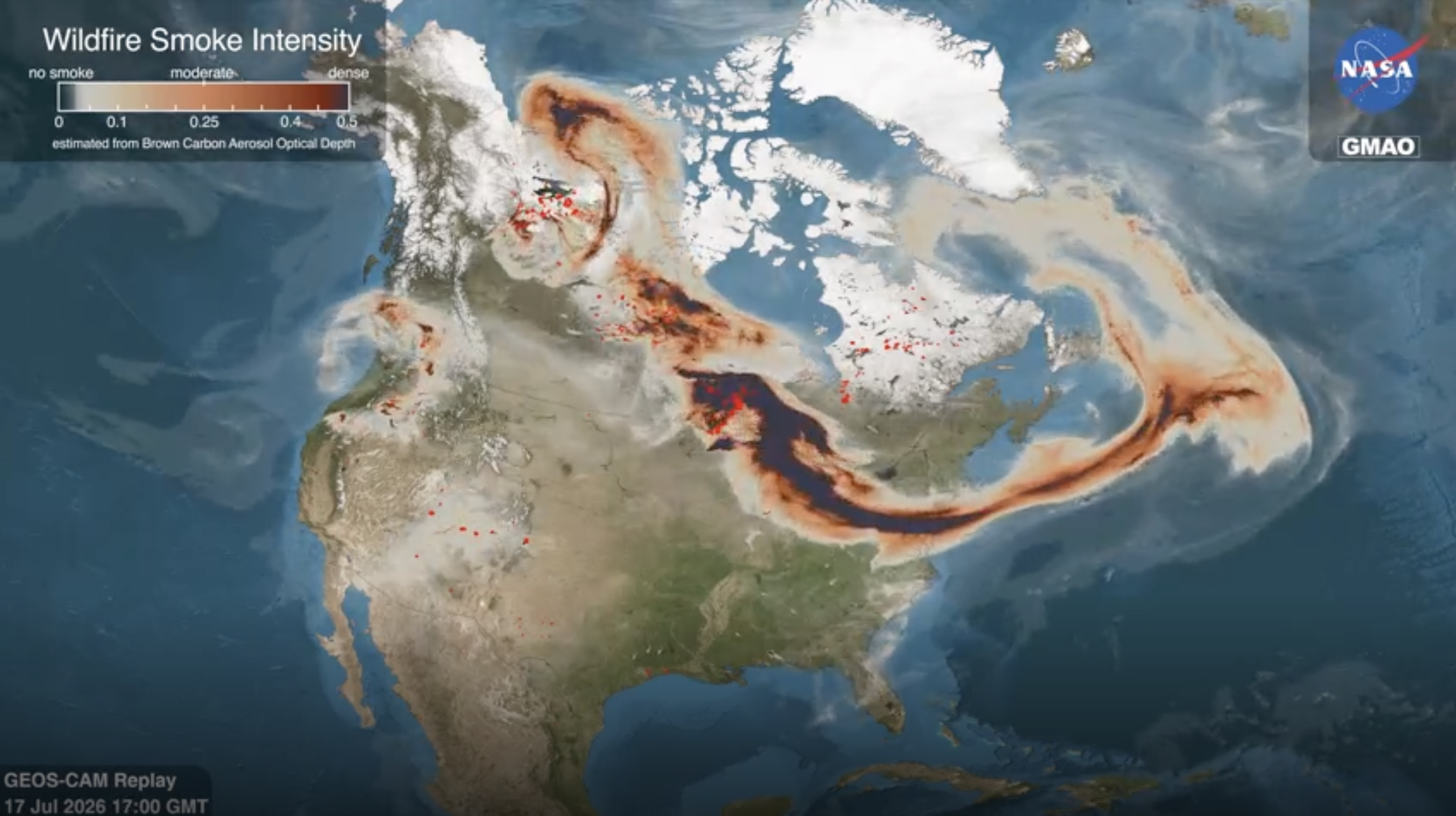
Wildfire Smoke Intensity, July 17, 2026

On July 18, 2026, efforts to stop the spread of the Bear Trap fire were temporarily successful in stopping the fire's spread. On July 20, 2026, it was reported that no new fires had started after a storm. Due to improved weather, the spread of the fires was slowed, and some control lines have been set up, although containment continues to prove difficult. The fires have been found to be burning as deep as 20–30 feet underground, which further hinders attempts at containment. By then, at least 8,000 people had been evacuated.

By July 23, 2026, more than 1,000 emergency personnel were involved in the firefighting. Rain has been able to slow the spread of the fires. Full containment was reported for all ten minor fires. Heavy rain on July 30–31 brought relief, along with concerns that lightning may have started new fires. The United States Forest Service announced that limited public access to about 40% of the Boundary waters would begin on July 30. Superior National Forest also re-opened to visitors. On August 5, more of the Boundary waters was reopened, bringing the open areas to now cover two-thirds of the wilderness area. Continued rain was able to slow and calm the fires, however as little as five days without rain would be enough to bring the fires back into a much more dangerous state. On August 11, Alaskan firefighter Leslie R. Washington died while fighting the Bear Trap fire, becoming the first (and so far, the only) fatality. Governor Tim Walz ordered flags to be flown at half-mast in his honor. On August 26, the Minnesota DNR lifted some burning restrictions, allowing campfires and other recreational fires to be allowed across the state, as fire risk was lowered to low and moderate across the state.

On September 17, all fires were announced to be at 100% containment. On September 22, all fires except the Bear Trap and Thumb fires were put out.

== Aftermath ==
In early October, as the fires continued to decline, the Ojibwe, City of Duluth, the DNR, and the U.S. Fish and Wildlife Service began doing controlled burns, or 'Good Fire', to increase forest health. Economic loss is estimated at ~$9 million. Governor Walz encouraged affected businesses to apply for disaster relief loans.

== List of wildfires ==
The following is a list of fires that burned more than 1,000 acres (400 ha), produced significant structural damage, or resulted in casualties.

Name	County	Acres	Start date	Containment date (Note: Containment means that fire crews have established and secured control lines around the fire's perimeter. These lines are artificial barriers, like trenches or cleared vegetation, designed to stop the fire's spread, or natural barriers like rivers. Containment reflects progress in managing the fire but does not necessarily mean the fire is starved of fuel, under control, or put out.)	Notes	Ref.
Lone Pine	Becker	1,500	April 22	April 27	Undetermined cause. Burned in Callaway.	
Flanders	Crow Wing	1,685	May 16	May 20	Caused by a campfire. Prompted evacuations in Mission. Damaged several houses and destroyed several outbuildings.	
Thumb	St. Louis, Ontario (CA)	25,014 (Note: Includes area burned in Canada.)	July 7	September 17	Lightning-caused. Burning in Boundary Waters Canoe Area Wilderness (BWCAW), closing the area and prompting evacuations. Merged with the Wolfpack Fire on August 15.	
Camp	Lake	4,357	July 7	September 17	Lightning-caused. Burning northeast of Ely and prompting evacuations.	
Bear Trap	St. Louis, Lake, Ontario (CA)	30,804	July 7	September 17	Lightning-caused. Burned 20 miles (32 km) north of Ely in BCWAW. Prompting evacuations and merged with the Dark Fire on July 12. One fatality.	
Sioux	St. Louis	6,833	July 9	September 17	Lightning-caused. Burned east of Jeanette Campground. Partially closing Echo Trail, prompting evacuations, and threatening structures.	
Little Knife	Lake, Ontario (CA)	86,000	July 12	September 17	Lightning-caused. Included two merged fires. Crossed over from Canada.	

== See also ==
- 2026 South Dakota wildfires
- 2026 United States wildfires
- Wildfires in 2026
- Cloquet Fire
