= 2026 Alabama wildfires =

Statistics
- Total fires: 2,000
- Total area: 29,116.31 acres (11,782.95 ha; 45.49423 sq mi)

A series of wildfires are burning throughout the U.S. state of Alabama. As of May 4, a total of 2,000 fires have burned 29,116.31 acres (11,782.95 ha).

== Background ==
A typical fire season in Alabama peaks in mid-August and lasts about thirty weeks in all, but there are two main seasons, February–May and October–December. Most preventative prescribed burns occur from late fall to early spring. On average, every year there are roughly 4,000 wildfires that burn around 40,000 acres (16,000 ha) with debris burning and arson being some of the leading causes. In North Alabama, steep and complicated terrain and hardwood forests impact fire spread and suppression efforts. In Central Alabama, the Piedmont plateau and the Upper Coastal Plain have tree plantations and transitional hardwood trees are often the location of routine ignitions, with conditions significantly worsened during drought. In South Alabama, longleaf pine coupled with flat terrain and sandy soil can increase the spread rate of wildfires.

== List of wildfires ==
The following is a list of fires that burned more than 1,000 acres (400 ha), produced significant structural damage, or resulted in casualties.

Name	County	Acres	Start date	Containment date (Note: Containment means that fire crews have established and secured control lines around the fire's perimeter. These lines are artificial barriers, like trenches or cleared vegetation, designed to stop the fire's spread, or natural barriers like rivers. Containment reflects progress in managing the fire but does not necessarily mean the fire is starved of fuel, under control, or put out.)	Notes	Ref.
Burgess East	Clay	1,020	March 21	March 23	Human-caused. Burned 5 miles (8.0 km) east-northeast of Chandler Springs.	
Hall Thompson Lane	Shelby	2,500	March 27	April 13	Undetermined cause. Burned 19 miles (31 km) north of Westover.	
Williams Creek	Perry, Chilton	1,650	April 4	April 15	Human caused. Burned 14 miles (23 km) southeast of Centreville.	
Rafey	Mobile	1,810	April 11	April 30	Undetermined cause. Burned 33 miles (53 km) north of Citronelle.	

Perimeters of 2026 Alabama wildfires (map data)

== See also ==
- 2026 Florida wildfires
- 2026 Georgia wildfires
- 2026 Mississippi wildfires
- 2026 United States wildfires
- Wildfires in 2026
