= 2026 Arizona wildfires =

Series of wildfires

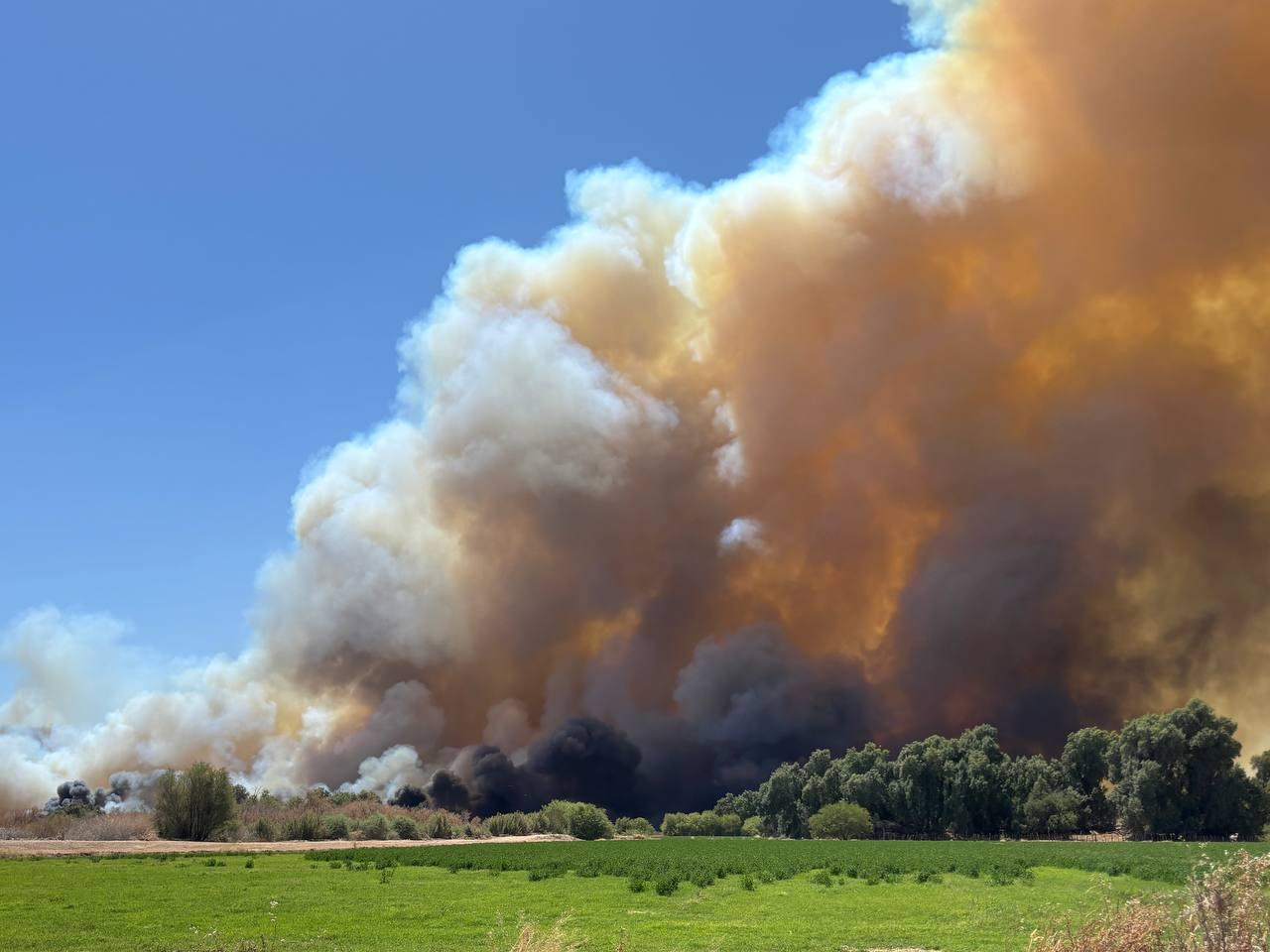
- The Hazen Fire burning on May 3

Statistics
- Total area: 35,000 acres (55 mi^{2})+

The 2026 Arizona wildfires are a series of active wildfires currently ongoing in the U.S. state of Arizona.

== Background ==
Historically, while "fire season" in Arizona began in April in desert areas and May around the Mogollon Rim with peak activities near July, there is now a fire risk year-round. Arizona is drought-prone, with precipitation much different between the deserts and mountains. When the snow pack on the mountain melts, the moisture can reduce the risk of wildfire events. However, climate change can raise the snow line, reduce snow pack, decrease runoff, or cause earlier snowmelt. A risk of decreasing precipitation and dry monsoons could heighten fire risks. Heavy rainfall can allow vegetation to grow, and many of these plants quickly dry out in just hours.

== List of wildfires ==
The following is a list of fires that burned more than 1,000 acres (400 ha), produced significant structural damage, or resulted in casualties.

Name	County	Acres	Start date	Containment date	Notes	Ref.
Havasu	Mohave	3,868	January 19	January 28	Started from an escaped prescribed burn.	
Hazen	Maricopa	1,191	May 2	May 15	Cause undetermined but unrelated to weather. Burned near Buckeye.	
Rock Canyon	Coconino	4,823	June 15	July 6	Lightning-caused. Burned in Kaibab National Forest, 9 miles (14 km) south of U.S. Route 89 in Arizona near the Arizona–Utah border.	
Sycamore	Gila	11,938	June 15	July 10	Lightning-caused. Burned in Tonto National Forest 2.1 miles (3.4 km) west of Steer Mountain. Prompted level two "set" evacuations. (Note: In Arizona, there are three evacuation levels: level one, or ready, means to prepare for potential hazards, level two, or set, means hazards are in your area, and level three, or go, means life-threatening hazards are in your area.)	
Pocket	Coconino, Yavapai	27,393	June 19	July 30	Unknown cause. Burned 7 miles (11 km) north of Sedona and prompted numerous level two evacuations and impacted air quality in areas around the fire.	
Steamboat	Gila, Pinal	1,576	June 26	July 1	Prompted evacuation orders for Victory Ranch and Linx Ranch.	
Island	La Paz	3,218	July 25	August 11	Burned in Cibola.	

== See also ==
- 2026 California wildfires
- 2026 Colorado wildfires
- 2026 New Mexico wildfires
- 2026 United States wildfires
- Wildfires in 2026
