= 2026 Alaska wildfires =

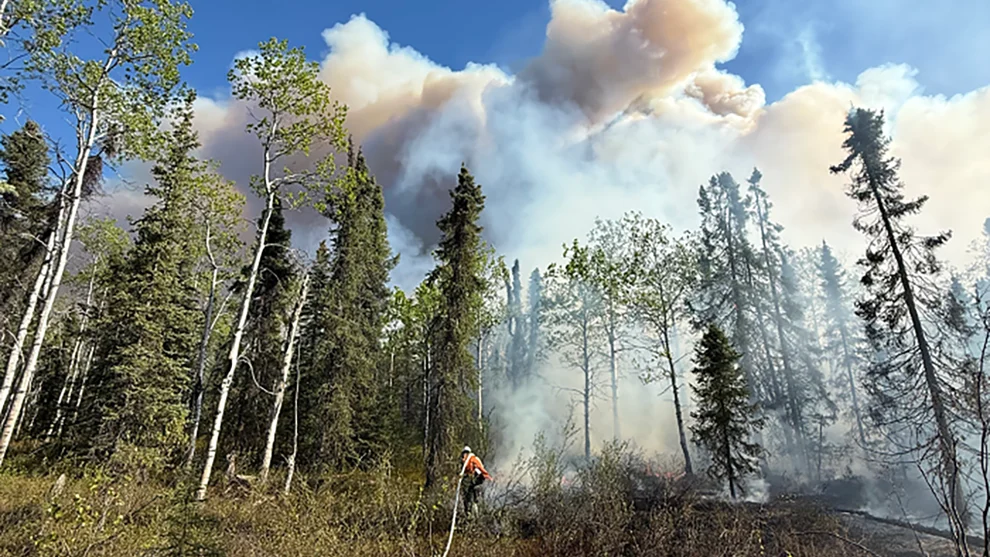
- The Kopshesut Fire on June 6

A series of wildfires have been burning throughout the U.S. state of Alaska.

== Background ==
"Fire season" in Alaska now starts on April 1, one month earlier than historically. Large fires typically start in late May and are contained by late July. The Interior has four fire distinct stages. The first occurs soon after snowmelt from dry grass ignited by humans spread by wind. The peak of fire season occurs around the summer solstice when long, warm daylight hours dry out plant litter that is ignited by lightning. In late July, high temperatures and drought extend fire season. In autumn, fire activity tends to slow down due to cooling temperatures and shorter day length. However, fire managers have been challenged in recent decades due to variability. Most wildfires burn in the Interior boreal forest between the Brooks Range and Alaska Range.

== Summary ==
=== Pre-season conditions ===
Portions of the Interior received significant snowpack while other parts of the state received average or slightly below average levels. In May 2026, temperatures were below average for most of the state aside from the northwest portion. Precipitation was above average in the south-central area and below normal in the eastern and central Interior regions. Precipitation eliminated concerns of abnormal dryness in the Kenai Peninsula. Cooler temperatures in April and May slightly hindered snowmelt, however, most snow has melted across the state. The El Niño–Southern Oscillation developed into the 2026–2027 "Super" El Niño event, and is predicted to become moderate or strong by autumn, which may increase fire activity. Despite this, the peak of the El Niño will be after fire season in Alaska ends.

=== Predictions and events ===
The National Interagency Fire Center (NIFC) has predicted normal potential for significant wildfires from June to September. Middle and low levels of plant litter should remain too damp to support ignitions while the upper layer is dry enough to foster conditions. The Climate Prediction Center (CPC) has predicted above-average temperatures for the latter half of June, but otherwise conditions are typical for this phase of fire season. Lightning partway into June has sparked several wildfires, especially in the Matanuska-Susitna Valley, with 4,340 lightning strikes reported on June 19.

== List of wildfires ==
The following is a list of fires that burned more than 1,000 acres (400 ha), produced significant structural damage, or resulted in casualties.

Name	Borough	Acres	Start date	Containment date (Note: Containment means that fire crews have established and secured control lines around the fire's perimeter. These lines are artificial barriers, like trenches or cleared vegetation, designed to stop the fire's spread, or natural barriers like rivers. Containment reflects progress in managing the fire but does not necessarily mean the fire is starved of fuel, under control, or put out.)	Notes	Ref.
Kopshesut	Northwest Arctic	1,447	June 4	June 15	Human-caused. Burned in the Ambler landfill.	
Canyon	Yukon-Koyukuk	1,001	June 11	0%	Lightning-caused. Burning 20 miles (32 km) west of Rampart along the Yukon River and threatening structures.	
Kilolitna	Yukon-Koyukuk	4,526	June 12	0%	Lightning-caused. Burning 60 miles (97 km) northwest of Rampart in Kanuti National Wildlife Refuge.	
Bear	Denali	3,409	June 19	0%	Lightning-caused. Burning 35 miles (56 km) southeast of Lake Minchumina.	
Shaw	Southeast Fairbanks	1,428	June 20	0%	Lightning-caused. Burning 23 miles (37 km) northeast of Delta Junction.	
Kathul	Southeast Fairbanks	2,998	June 20	0%	Lightning-caused. Burning in Yukon-Charley Rivers National Preserve.	
Kilusiktok	Nome	1,988	June 25	0%	Lightning-caused. Burning 51 miles (82 km) northeast of Koyuk.	
Doorstep	Yukon-Koyukuk	1,174	June 25	0%	Lightning-caused. Burning 32 miles (51 km) southeast of Bettles.	
Allen	Yukon-Koyukuk	1,539	June 26	0%	Lightning-caused. Burning 47 miles (76 km) west of Wiseman.	

== See also ==
- 2026 Canadian wildfires
- 2026 United States wildfires
- Wildfires in 2026
