= 2026 Idaho wildfires =

Natural disasters in the USA

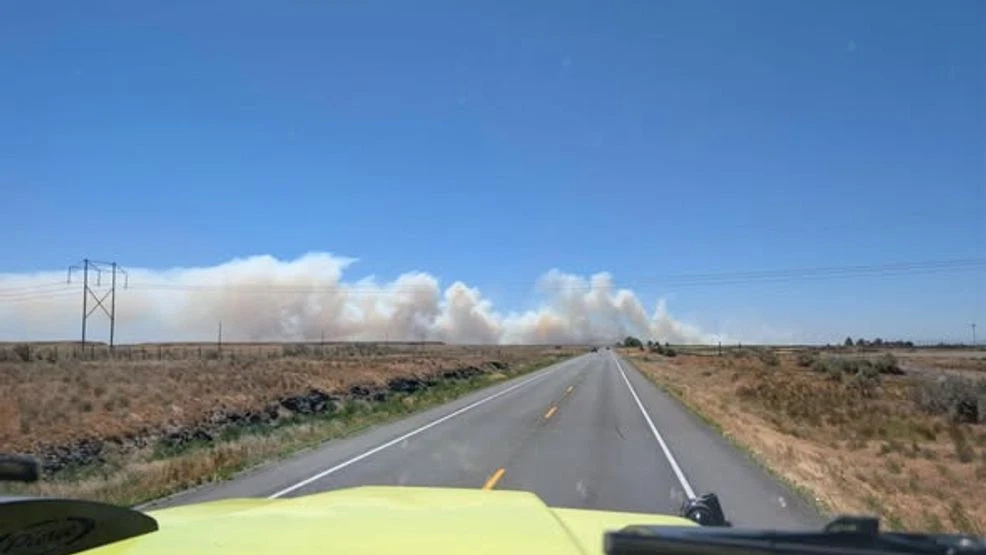
- The Median Fire on June 17

The 2026 Idaho wildfires are a series of wildfires burning throughout the U.S. state of Idaho.

== Background ==
While the "fire season" in Idaho varies every year based on fire weather conditions, most wildfires occur from June to September. Fire activities normally increase in July and August because of drier conditions, hotter temperatures, and more lightning strikes from thunderstorms. However, wildfire severity can vary every year based on preseason conditions such as snowpack and the overcrowded growth of vegetation and dying trees.

== List of wildfires ==
The following is a list of fires that burned more than 1,000 acres (400 ha), or produced significant structural damage or casualties.

Name	County	Acres	Start date	Containment date (Note: Containment means that fire crews have established and secured control lines around the fire's perimeter. These lines are artificial barriers, like trenches or cleared vegetation, designed to stop the fire's spread, or natural barriers like rivers. Containment reflects progress in managing the fire but does not necessarily mean the fire is starved of fuel, under control, or put out.)	Notes	Ref
Pasadena Valley	Elmore	1,729	May 13	May 14	Burned east of Glenns Ferry.	
Sailor Cap	Owyhee	8,292	May 18	May 19	Burned 15 miles (24 km) south of Hammett.	
Moore	Ada	1,399	May 23	May 23	Burned 8 miles (13 km) southeast of Melba.	
Kinyon Springs	Owyhee	1,573	May 25	May 26	Burned 15 miles (24 km) south of Glenns Ferry.	
Dewoff	Blaine	2,078	May 25	May 26	Burned east of Lake Walcott.	
Black Ridge	Lincoln	3,298	May 25	May 26	Burned south of the Sand Butte Wilderness Study Area.	
Summit Creek	Cassia	1,877	May 25	June 15	Caused by lightning. Burned in the Albion Mountains.	
Blue Ridge	Owyhee	14,317	June 5	June 6	Undetermined cause. Burned 16 miles (26 km) west of Buhl.	
Michaud Creek	Power	1,560	June 5	June 7	Burned near Pocatello Regional Airport.	
Chalk	Elmore	1,500	June 15	June 16	Cause under investigation. Burned 2.5 miles (4.0 km) northwest of Hammett.	
Median	Gooding	4,060	June 17	June 18	Cause under investigation. Burned 4 miles (6.4 km) northwest of Wendell. Threatened structures and closed State Highway 46.	
Mary	Owyhee	1,200	June 20	June 21	Burned 25 miles (40 km) northeast of Owyhee, Nevada.	
Mora	Ada	2,426	July 5	July 6	Cause under investigation. Burned in Kuna. Prompted evacuations and threatened structures.	
Maze	Madison	1,579	July 6	July 8	Burned west of Rexburg.	
Claremont	Ada, Boise	6,627	July 6	August 4	Burning in Boise and prompting evacuations.	
Gulch	Gem	1,798	July 6	July 7	Burned east of Emmett.	
Upper Smith	Boundary	4,552	July 8	36%	Lightning-caused. Burning 20 miles (32 km) northwest of Bonners Ferry.	
Martin	Blaine	1,065	July 9	July 10	Burned in Bellevue.	
Cow Canyon	Oneida	3,998	July 12	July 13	Unknown cause. Burned along Interstate 84 in Snowville.	
Black Ridge 2	Lincoln	15,000	July 16	July 17	Burned east of Owinza.	
Cascade	Idaho	4,571	July 17	50%	Lightning-caused. Burning 22 miles (35 km) east of Lowell.	
Ohio	Blaine	2,035	July 18	July 21	Burned northeast of Hailey and prompting evacuation warnings in the Heather Ohio Valley.	
Grassy Hills	Owyhee	2,231	July 18	July 18		
Grandold	Elmore	1,011	July 23	July 24		
Duncan	Owyhee	16,812	July 23	July 26	Lightning-caused. Burned in Big Jacks Wilderness Area.	
Hopper	Owyhee	2,521	July 24	July 26		
Beck	Elmore	1,500	July 24	July 25	Burned east of Interstate 84.	
Tartar	Washington	158,027	July 24	98%	Burning just east of the Snake River and prompted evacuations.	
Peer	Owyhee	1,324	July 24	July 27	Closing North Fork Campground with the Big Grass Fire in Oregon.	
Double Springs	Custer	1,779	July 24	18%	Burning 9.5 miles (15.3 km) east of U.S. 93.	
Scorp	Owyhee	4,764	July 25	July 26	Burning west of Murphy and threatened structures.	
Gaston	Power	1,636	July 25	July 26	Burned 13 miles (21 km) northwest of Aberdeen.	
Lake Channel	Power	2,516	July 29	August 2	Lightning-caused. Burned in American Falls.	
Moose Mountain	Clearwater	4,207	July 30	8%	Lightning-caused. Burning 4 miles (6.4 km) north of Kelly Forks Campground.	
Big Rock	Jefferson, Madison	2,204	July 31	August 13	Lightning-caused. Burned in Heise and closing recreational areas. Mudslides occurred after rainfall in burn scar.	
MM115 Hwy 20	Elmore	5,070	August 7	August 13	Cause under investigation. Closed U.S. Route 20.	
Bigfoot	Ada, Elmore	1,135	August 15	August 16	Burned northeast of the Snake River.	
Crooked	Boise, Elmore	3,164	August 18	0%	Closing part of Boise National Forest.	
North Heglar	Cassia, Power	1,844	August 19	87%	Burning in Malta.	
Fraser	Elmore	3,981	August 22	August 23	Burned north of Mountain Home Air Force Base.	
Shale Butte	Lincoln	1,691	August 22	August 24	Burned 9 miles (14 km) north of Kimama.	
Tuana Gulch	Elmore	2,700	August 24	0%		
Wildhorse	Lincoln	3,000	August 24	0%	Burning 10 miles (16 km) north of Kimama.	
Flint	Owyhee	6,000	August 24	0%	Burning south of Silver City and prompting evacuations.	

== See also ==
- 2026 United States wildfires
