= 2026 Texas wildfires =

Statistics
- Total fires: 15
- Total area: 76,553 acres (30,980 ha)

The 2026 Texas wildfires were a series of wildfires that burned in the U.S. state of Texas.

== Background ==
While "fire season" varies every year in Texas, most wildfires occur in between February and April. However, there is an increasing fire danger all year-round. Fire conditions can be exacerbated by drought, strong winds, La Niña, and vegetation growth. Climate change is leading to increased temperatures, lower humidity levels, and drought conditions that are happening more often.

== List of wildfires ==
The following is a list of fires that burned more than 1,000 acres (400 ha), produced significant structural damage, or resulted in casualties.

Name	County	Acres	Start date	Containment date (Note: Containment means that fire crews have established and secured control lines around the fire's perimeter. These lines are artificial barriers, like trenches or cleared vegetation, designed to stop the fire's spread, or natural barriers like rivers. Containment reflects progress in managing the fire but does not necessarily mean the fire is starved of fuel, under control, or put out.)	Notes	Ref.
8 Ball	Armstrong, Donley	13,564	February 17	February 21	Caused evacuations for the community of Howardwick.	
Lavender	Oldham, Potter	18,423	February 17	February 22	Caused evacuations for boys ranch	
Cypress Creek Wilderness	Angelina, Jasper	6,745	February 24	March 9	Burned in the Angelia national forest. 1 million in suppression costs	
Nebo Mountain	Gillespie	1,160	February 24	February 25		
Dolly	Swisher	1,533	March 3	March 3		
Cabin Creek	Gray	7,000	March 9	March 11	Burned east of Lefors.	
Yellow	Oldham, Moore, Hartley	14,374	March 10	March 13	Burned east of Channing. Closed State Highway 354. Prompted the evacuation of Valle de Oro.	
Neon Beige	Oldham	1,688	March 15	March 16		
Armstrong Oaks	Brooks, Kenedy	2,245	March 19	March 21		
Hutchinson	Hutchinson	2,937	March 24	March 27		
Lefty	Hall	1,382	April 2	April 4	Burned 25 miles (40 km) west of Childress.	
Meadow View	Potter	1,262	April 6	April 8		
Red	Oldham	3,000	April 9	95%	Burning southeast of Channing. Lightning caused	
Purple Monster	Oldham	1,910	April 9	April 11	Burned north of Vega. Lightning caused	
Neon White	Dickens	1,240	April 17	April 20	Burned 10 miles (16 km) northeast of Dickens.	
Hunggate	Randall, Deaf Smith	34,131	May 14	May 19	Lightning-caused. Prompted evacuations near Canyon and destroyed a trestle bridge, three residential structures, and several outbuildings. Merged with the Chocolate Chip Fire.	
Shifty	Potter	5,277	May 14	May 15	Burned west of U.S. Route 87.	
McBride	Carson	2,192	May 14	May 14	Burned northwest of Panhandle.	
Crooked Crook	Motley	1,388	May 14	May 15	Burned northeast of Matador.	
Roman	Hartley	6,294	May 14	May 16	Burning in Romero.	
Cherokee	Briscoe, Hall	3,222	May 15	May 16	Closed State Highway 70 near Antelope Flats.	
Western	Randall	1,137	May 15	May 16	Lightning-caused. Burned south of Canyon.	
Ox Bow	Hall	1,014	May 15	May 16	Lightning-caused. Burned northeast of Turkey.	
Chainey Mountain	Hall	1,201	May 15	May 16	Lightning-caused. Burned west of Childress.	
Rita Blanca Unit 32	Dallam	8,907	May 15	May 16	Burned on Rita Blanca National Grassland.	
Comanche	Motley, Cottle, Hall	1,990	May 15	May 17	Lightning-caused. Burned off FM 94.	
Stinky	Potter	2,335	May 17	May 21	Burned at a landfill in Amarillo.	
Kress	Swisher	1,551	May 18	May 19	Burned in Kress.	
Getaway Pens	Dickens	1,034	July 8	July 12	Burned 14 miles (23 km) east of Spur.	
Cusenbary Draw	Sutton	1,376	July 9	July 11	Burned east of U.S. Route 277.	
Rio Escondido	Coryell, Hamilton	2,626	August 24	50%	Prompting evacuations just northeast of Evant.	
Ross	Jack, Palo Pinto	87,796.1	August 24	21%	Burning 3 miles (4.8 km) southwest of Palo Pinto. Prompting evacuations, closed U.S. Route 180, and destroyed at least five structures, including Worth Ranch.	
Rafter 4B	Schleicher, Texas	2,125	September 26	80%	Burning found roughly 8 miles (13 km) Miles SE from Eldorado, TX.	

== See also ==
- 2026 United States wildfires
