= 2026 Oklahoma wildfires =

Natural disasters in the US

- Date: January 15, 2026 - ongoing

Statistics
- Total fires: 122
- Total area: 302,200 acres (122,296 ha)

Impacts
- Injuries: 4

The 2026 Oklahoma wildfires were a series of wildfires that burned in the U.S. state of Oklahoma.

== Background ==
Fire season in Oklahoma typically occurs in the early and late months of the year. Peak fire season is usually in March, the windiest month on average for Oklahoma. Due to the grassy fuels in Oklahoma, among the main factors that push fires are wind and dry fuels.

== Summary ==
The 2026 Oklahoma wildfire season began in mid-January with 31 wildfires due to severe red flag conditions across the state caused by high winds.

== List of wildfires ==
The following is a list of fires that burned more than 1,000 acres (400 ha), produced significant structural damage, or resulted in casualties.

Name	County	Acres	Start date	Containment date (Note: Containment means that fire crews have established and secured control lines around the fire's perimeter. These lines are artificial barriers, like trenches or cleared vegetation, designed to stop the fire's spread, or natural barriers like rivers. Containment reflects progress in managing the fire but does not necessarily mean the fire is starved of fuel, under control, or put out.)	Notes	Ref.
Shell Creek	McIntosh	1,263	January 15	January 19		
Calf	Pittsburg	1,575	January 16	January 20		
Flat Tire	Beaver	1,983	February 10	February 13		
Gray	McIntosh	1,087	February 10	February 15		
43 Road	Woodward	1,680	February 17	February 22	Caused evacuations for the city of Woodward.	
Side Road	Texas	3,680	February 17	February 22		
Ranger Road	Beaver (OK), Harper (OK), Clark (KS), Comanche (KS), Meade (KS)	283,283	February 17	February 24	2026 Kansas wildfires – Caused evacuation orders for the communities of Englewood and Ashland in Kansas.	
Stevens	Stevens (KS), Seward (KS), Texas (OK)	12,428	February 17	February 23	2026 Kansas wildfires - Caused evacuations for the community of Tyrone.	
Poor Farm	Pittsburg, Latimer	9,565	February 19	February 23		
Doke Number Two	Atoka	2,477	February 27	March 2		
Yearling Pasture	Osage	5,039	March 13	April 3		
Five	Osage	1,960	March 14	March 21		
Salt Fork	Greer, Jackson	3,327	March 15	March 18		
Rattlesnake Hollow	McIntosh	1,027	March 18	March 23		
Drummond	Osage	5,000	March 18	April 3		
Sand Creek	Osage	6,897	March 20	March 28		
Sunshine Hollow	Pushmataha	1,600	March 22	March 26		
Pumpkin Hollow	Adair, Cherokee	1,128	March 23	March 27		
Oxbow	Okfuskee	2,068	March 23	March 26, 2026		
Middle Creek	Hughes, McIntosh	1,935	March 23	March 27		
Luna Branch	Adair	1,279	March 23	March 27		
Sonny Glle	Adair	1,222	March 23	March 27		
Iron Post	Cherokee	1,309	March 24	March 28		
Ware	Osage	2,271	March 24	April 14		
Box	Osage	2,486	March 26	April 3	Burned 7 miles (11 km) south of Gray Horse.	
Zipperer	Pittsburg, Latimer	1,216	March 26	March 27		
Big Toe	Pittsburg	1,256	March 27	March 31		
Boman	Osage	1,810	March 28	April 3	Burning along State Highway 11 in Barnsdall.	
Sunny	Osage	1,837	April 8	April 16	Burned 9 miles (14 km) northeast of Pawhuska.	
Lightning Roll	Beaver	2,412	April 9	April 12	Burned northwest of Balko.	
Hughey	Osage	1,391	April 9	April 10	Burned 5 miles (8.0 km) southwest of Bartlesville.	
Tex-Ok	Cimarron	23,884	May 14	May 19	Lightning-caused. Burned 7 miles (11 km) southeast of Boise City.	
State Line	Cimarron, Baca (CO)	1,897	May 14	May 15	Burned east of U.S. Route 287.	
Ballard	Cimarron, Baca (CO)	18,323	May 15	May 19	Lightning-caused. Burned along the Cimarron River.	
Sharpe	Cimarron	29,599	May 15	May 21	Burned northwest of Boise City.	
School Lands	Woods	2,410	June 17	June 21	Lightning-caused. Burned 8.5 miles (13.7 km) northwest of Waynoka.	
Burnt Canyon	Harper, Woodward	3,335	August 15	August 19	Burned 14 miles (23 km) northeast of Woodward.	

== See also ==
- 2026 United States wildfires
