= 2026 New Mexico wildfires =

Natural disasters in the USA

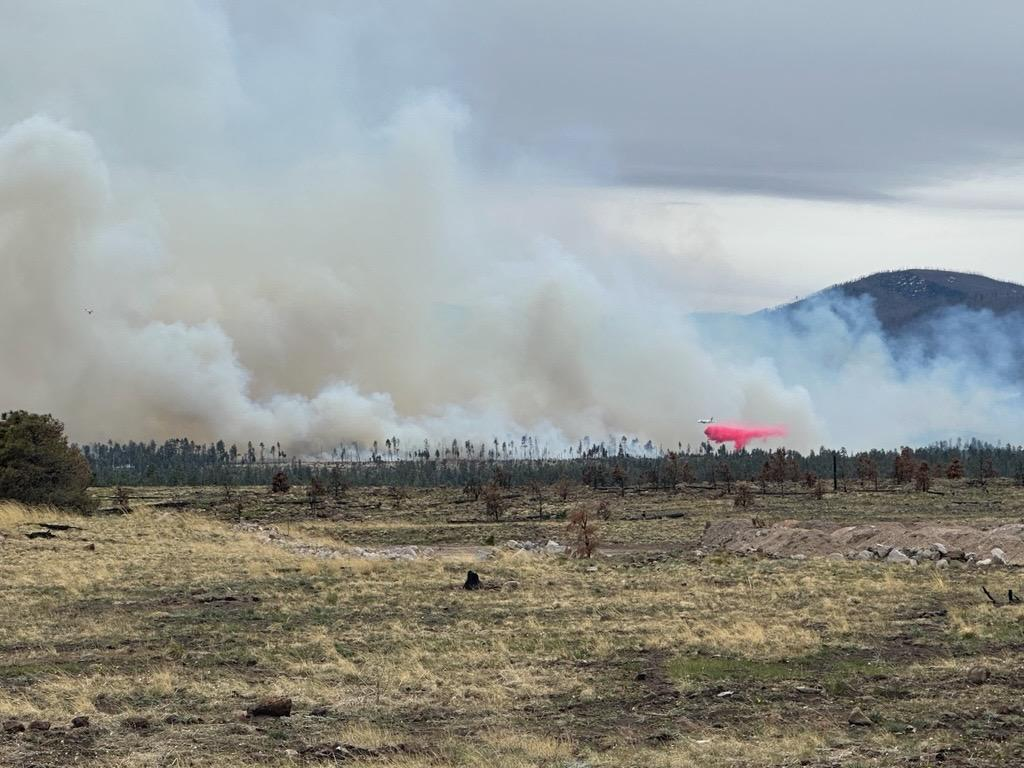
- A plane dropping fire retardant on the Hummingbird Fire on April 25

The 2026 New Mexico wildfires are a series of wildfires burning in the U.S. state of New Mexico.

== Background ==
While "fire season" can vary every year in New Mexico based on weather conditions, most wildfires occur in from early May through June, before the monsoon season. However, there is an increasing fire risk year-round from climate change. Droughts are becoming more common partly from rising temperatures in the state that evaporate water from streams. Unpredictable monsoon levels can increase fire risks. New Mexico is prone to strong winds, and jet stream disruption from climate change can make them stronger. Intense winds contribute to drought, allow wildfires to spread, and dry out vegetation. Unique plant life and fine fuels in the state fuel wildfires, especially in the Eastern New Mexico grasslands. Rising temperatures will reduce snowpack and shorten the snowmelt season which can increase drought and wildfire severity.

Overgrazing and logging in the late 1800s and over 100 years of strict fire suppression affected natural systems of New Mexico led to a growing wildfire risk and intensity. Scientists predict New Mexico's forests will gradually deteriorate, turning into shrublands as wildfires burn the forests.

== List of wildfires ==
The following is a list of fires that burned more than 1,000 acres (400 ha), produced significant structural damage, or resulted in casualties.

Name	County	Acres	Start date	Containment date (Note: Containment means that fire crews have established and secured control lines around the fire's perimeter. These lines are artificial barriers, like trenches or cleared vegetation, designed to stop the fire's spread, or natural barriers like rivers. Containment reflects progress in managing the fire but does not necessarily mean the fire is starved of fuel, under control, or put out.)	Notes	Ref.
Leche	San Miguel	3,366	February 9	February 19		
352	Quay	2,674	February 9	February 19		
Smith	Harding	1,200	February 17	February 20		
Helen	Mora	1,132	March 3	March 23	Burning along and closed State Highway 120 in Wagon Mound.	
Old 66	Quay	3,668	March 27	March 31		
HC 1	San Miguel	1,415	April 8	April 10		
Hummingbird	Catron	5,716	April 20	June 4	Prompted evacuations in the Gila Wilderness and Willow Creek subdivision.	
Sparks	Quay	6,000	April 28	May 1	Burning 16 miles (26 km) northwest of House along State Road 156.	
Crow Creek	Colfax	1,200	April 29	April 30	Closed U.S. Route 64.	
Mimms	Quay	7,093	May 14	May 29	Lightning-caused. Burning northwest of Jordan.	
Line	Quay, Oldham (TX), Hartley (TX)	30,144	May 14	May 29	Lightning-caused. Prompted evacuations in Nara Visa and impacted powerlines.	
Seven Cabins	Lincoln	31,860	May 14	June 11	Sparked by fatal medical plane crash, prompted evacuations near Pine Lodge and areas northwest. was Burning in the Capitan Mountains Wilderness.	
Black Mesa Trail	Union, Cimarron (OK), Baca (CO)	1,514	May 17	May 23		
Trigg	San Miguel	2,000	May 21	95%	Burning 17 miles (27 km) south of Mosquero.	
Bear	Catron	7,769	June 9	June 22	Lightning-caused. Burning in the Gila National Forest.	
Sacaton	Catron	9,861	June 21	July 21	Lightning-caused. Destroyed one structure and prompted evacuations for Willow Creek.	
Beehive	Rio Arriba	4,728	June 26	July 31	Burned in Carson National Forest 15 miles (24 km) west of Tres Piedras.	
Frijoles	Santa Fe	15,226	August 5	52%	Lightning-caused. Burning in the Pecos Wilderness Area and prompting evacuations.	
Rabbit Ear East	Union	1,500	August 24	70%	Burning in Clayton.	

== See also ==
- 2026 United States wildfires
