= 2026 Louisiana wildfires =

Series of wildfires

The 2026 Louisiana wildfires are a series of active and inactive wildfires currently ongoing in Louisiana.

== Background ==
While "fire season" varies every year in Louisiana, most wildfires occur between August and October, and February and April. However, there is an increasing fire danger in the fall and spring months. Fire conditions can be exacerbated by drought, a subtropical climate, strong winds, and vegetation growth. Climate change is leading to increased temperatures, extremely low humidity levels, and drought conditions that are happening more often. Agricultural burns and accidental sources account for the majority of wildfire starts in Louisiana.

== List of wildfires ==
The following is a list of fires that burned more than 1,000 acres (400 ha), produced significant structural damage, or resulted in casualties.

Name	Parish	Acres	Start date	Containment date	Notes	Ref.
Cluster	Winn	1,122	February 20	February 23		
Sunset	Winn	1,000	March 18	March 19		
Brown Ditch	Cameron	2,508	July 22	July 26	Human-caused. Burned 10 miles (16 km) south of Hackberry.	
West Blue Crab	Cameron	2,295	July 22	July 25	Lightning-caused. Burned 10 miles (16 km) south of Coastal Marsh.	
