= 2026 Florida wildfires =

Natural disasters in the USA

- Date: January 17 - present

Statistics
- Burned area: >100,000 acres

The 2026 Florida wildfires are a series of wildfires burning in the U.S. state of Florida.

== Background ==
Florida's wildfire season is shaped by its subtropical climate, seasonal rainfall shifts, human activity, and occasionally catastrophic weather events. The state traditionally experiences a prolonged dry season from October through May, during which wildfire risks are elevated. Central Florida and northern Florida typically sees its wildfire trends begin as early as January, with activity continuing into May or even early June—right before the onset of the rainy season and hurricane impacts.

Lightning is a potent natural ignition source—but its role is often overshadowed by human-caused fires, particularly those that originate from escaped yard debris burning and equipment sparks. In 2023, lightning accounted for more than 35% of wildfires, but the remainder were traced to human activities.

Florida's ecosystems—such as pine flatwoods and scrub—evolved with recurrent fire cycles, typically burning every 3 to 7 years to maintain ecological health. These fire-adapted landscapes depend on periodic burns to sustain species like the gopher tortoise and regenerating longleaf pine stands.

Major wildfire years have occurred in the past. One of the most destructive was the 1998 Florida wildfires, a series of thousands of fires sparked mostly by lightning and exacerbated by heavy vegetation growth followed by sudden drought conditions. These blazes scorched roughly 500,000 acres—including over 150 structures—before rains eventually helped contain them. In recent years, wildfire seasons have remained active and in some cases expanded.

Hurricanes leave behind another major and often overlooked risk factor: downed trees and debris. These serve as abundant dry fuel. Experts warn that when combined with ongoing drought and drought-induced dryness, these remnants contribute significantly to early and intense fire outbreaks each spring.

A lack of landfalling tropical cyclones in the 2025 Atlantic hurricane season contributed to one of the worst droughts in decades across the region, with 99% of the state being in drought and 85% being in severe drought or worse by mid-February 2026. By late March, over 70% of Florida was in extreme drought or worse.

== List of wildfires ==
The following is a list of fires that have burned more than 1,000 acres (400 ha), or caused significant structural damage or casualties.

Name	County	Acres	Start date	Containment date (Note: Containment means that fire crews have established and secured control lines around the fire's perimeter. These lines are artificial barriers, like trenches or cleared vegetation, designed to stop the fire's spread, or natural barriers like rivers. Containment reflects progress in managing the fire but does not necessarily mean the fire is starved of fuel, under control, or put out.)	Notes/References
Silver Lake	Wakulla	4,816	January 17	January 22	Human-caused in Apalachicola National Forest.
ST-1 Alpha	Highlands	3,047	February 3	February 5	
Curry Island 26	Glades	1,800	February 7	February 7	
Buggy	Broward	4,173	February 7	February 9	
West Boundary Road	Hendry	2,624	February 10	February 17	
640	Polk	1,216	February 10	February 10	
First Point	Okeechobee, Glades	8,612	February 12	February 13	This fire caused dense smoke throughout the Miami Metropolitan Area.
Levy	Osceola	1,300	February 15	February 15	
National	Collier	35,027	February 22	March 17	Human-caused in Big Cypress National Preserve. Caused dense smoke across the Florida Heartland Region, leading to the temporary closure of Alligator Alley. The fire led to the evacuation of the community of Jerome from burnout operations.
Radar	Polk	2,000	February 26	February 27	
Savannah	Liberty	1,930	March 3	March 27	
Old Bowling Green	Polk	3,297	March 5	March 12	
Cliff Lake	Liberty	6,499	March 17	May 6	
Mill Pond	Liberty	1,760	March 19	May 6	
Sargent	Baker, Columbia, Clinch (GA)	2,523	April 2	June 3	Burned west of Rockvil along State Road 2. large pyrocumulus cloud was produced.
Newman Drive	Collier	1,733	April 13	April 22	Prompted evacuations for portions of Naples.
Crews Road	Clay	2,000	April 19	April 20 (Merged with Railroad Complex Fire)	Prompting several evacuations near Leno. Shut down Amtrak service for the nearby railroad.
Railroad Complex	Putnam, Clay	4,796	April 19	May 28	Led to evacuations for areas to the north of Bostwick. Led to the closure of West Tocoi Road. Merged with the Crews Road Fire on April 20.
Mile Marker 45	Broward	9,600	April 21	April 24	
Cow Creek	Levy	2,364	April 21	May 29	Caused widespread evacuations in Central Levy County near the Goethe State Forest.
Highway 41	Miami-Dade	9,149	April 27	May 3	Closed parts of Everglades National Park.
South Canal	Lafayette	2,265	May 4	97%	
Max Road Miramar	Broward, Miami-Dade	11,446	May 10	May 13	Burned in Everglades National Park west of U.S. Route 27.
Shell	Lake	2,822	May 22	June 16	Lightning-caused. Burning 13 miles (21 km) west of Deland.
Mile Marker 44	Broward	1,200	May 23	May 26	
Wawa 2	Highlands	7,121	May 23	June 9	
340	Wakulla	3,255	May 23	June 16	
Rookery	Volusia	4,700	June 14	July 6	Lightning-caused. Burned in Lake Woodruff National Wildlife Refuge.
Quarry 2	Miami-Dade	19,018	June 15	July 9	Burned in Doral.
Well	Miami-Dade	2,814	June 16	July 17	Burning in Doral.
Coptic	Miami-Dade	5,685	June 17	June 21	Burned 15 miles (24 km) northwest of Homestead.
Platt Trap	Glades	2,513	June 21	June 26	Burned west of Lake Okeechobee.
Area 12	Palm Beach	12,000	June 23	July 1	
Atlantic	Broward	5,780	June 28	July 2	Lightning-caused. Burned in Tamarac.
Mile Marker 40 – Broward	Broward	6,750	July 16	95%	Cause under investigation. Burning west of U.S. 27.
Berger	Palm Beach	19,700	July 17	July 25	Unknown cause. Burned in Loxahatchee.
Holey	Broward	5,000	July 28	July 31	Burned 6 miles (9.7 km) north of Interstate 75.
Jones Island	Volusia	1,107	August 10	August 11	
Movie Dome	Miami-Dade	6,207	August 19	August 24	
Chipmunk	Miami-Dade	17,000	August 22	60%	Lightning-caused. Burning 15 miles (24 km) west of Homestead.

== See also ==
- 2026 United States wildfires
