= Big Grass Fire =

2026 wildfire in Oregon, United States

- Date: July 23 – September 14, 2026
- Location: Idaho and Oregon, United States

Statistics
- Status: Extinguished

Map
- Perimeter map of Big Grass Fire (map data)

The Big Grass Fire was a wildfire in the U.S. states of Idaho and Oregon. Started by lighting on July 23, 2026, it is the largest wildfire in modern Oregon history. As of September 11, 2026, the fire is 578,637 acres and 94% contained.

Governor Brad Little signed a disaster emergency declaration to dedicate Idaho National Guard resources to the fire.

By September 13, 2026, the fire was contained.
