= Mission, Minnesota =

Unincorporated community in Minnesota, United States

Mission
- Unincorporated community
- Location within Minnesota Location within the United States
- Coordinates: 46°35′17″N 94°03′04″W
- Country: United States
- State: Minnesota
- County: Crow Wing
- Township: Mission Township
- Elevation: 1,230 ft (370 m)
- Time zone: UTC-6 (Central (CST))
  - Summer (DST): UTC-5 (CDT)
- ZIP code: 56441
- Area code: 218
- GNIS feature ID: 654833

Mission is an unincorporated community in Mission Township, Crow Wing County, Minnesota, United States, near Crosby and Merrifield. It is along Crow Wing County Road 11 near Mission Way.
