= 2026 Wyoming wildfires =

Series of wildfires

The 2026 Wyoming wildfires are a series of active wildfires currently ongoing in Wyoming.

== Background ==
"Wildfire season" in Wyoming typically occurs between June and September, but wildfires can occur as early as April and late as December. Peak time of the fire season is normally in July and August. Wildfires in Wyoming are triggered by a dry climate, drought, grasses die and dry out, and times when dry thunderstorms are more common. Humidity levels, dryness of fuel, wind, and temperature also play a crucial role. Forests that have not had wildfires in recent years have more fire fuel, and trees killed by disease and insect infestation quickly dry up and become a prime fuel for wildfires.

== List of wildfires ==
The following is a list of fires that burned more than 1,000 acres (400 ha), produced significant structural damage, or resulted in casualties.

Name	County	Acres	Start date	Containment date	Notes	Ref.
Porcupine Creek	Campbell	2,490	March 9	March 10	Caused evacuations for the town of Wright.	
Sandpiper	Converse, Natrona	6,287	March 20	March 21		
Kane	Big Horn	1,915	March 21	March 29		
Rochelle 2	Converse, Campbell	1,318	May 13	May 20	Burned in Wright.	
Raven Creek	Campbell, Wyoming	4,245	June 6	June 12	Caused by a downed powerline. Burned 13 miles (21 km) southeast of Moorcroft and damaged fencing.	
Kohns	Campbell	2,700	July 27	July 29	Lightning-caused. Burned in Rozet.	
Lumin	Sheridan	7,285	July 31	August 4	Burned 13 miles (21 km) north of Clearmont.	
