= 2026 Montana wildfires =

Series of wildfires

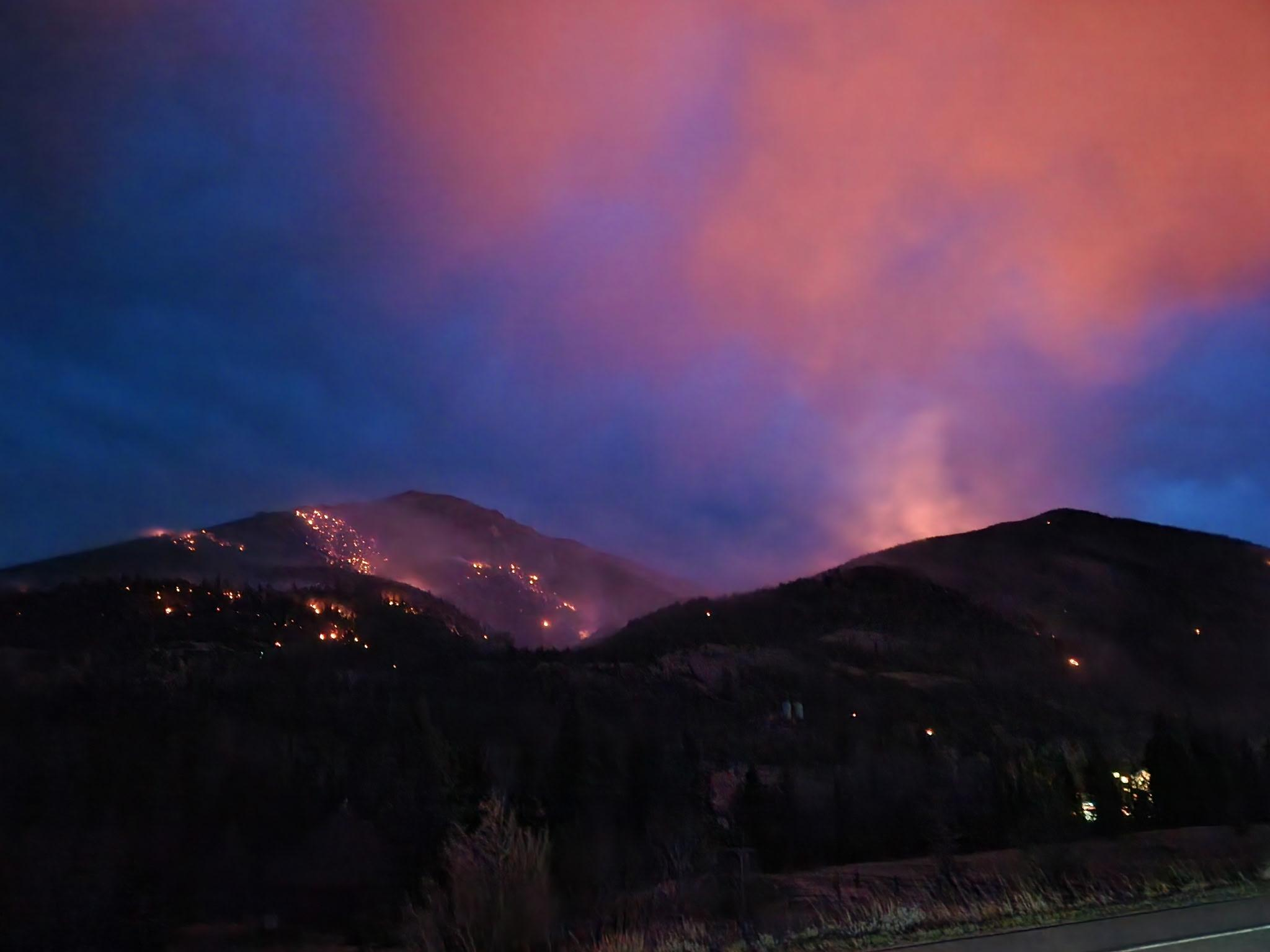
- The East Side Fire at night on April 21

The 2026 Montana wildfires are a series of active wildfires currently ongoing in Montana.

== Background ==
While "fire season" in Montana varies every year based on weather conditions, most wildfires occur in between May and October. Wildfires are influenced by above-average temperatures and dry conditions that influence drought. When vegetation dries out earlier in the season, wildfires are more likely to start and spread. The leading cause of wildfires in Montana is burning debris. The spread rate of wildfires is affected by the buildup of fuels.

== List of wildfires ==
The following is a list of fires that burned more than 1,000 acres (400 ha), produced significant structural damage, or resulted in casualties.

Name	County	Acres	Start date	Containment date	Notes	Ref.
Rehder Creek	Musselshell	5,060	February 26	March 1	Evacuation orders in Roundup and surrounding areas.	
March	Powder River	2,268	March 20	March 22		
East Side	Carbon	1,219	April 20	May 19	Cause under investigation. Closed U.S. Route 212 south of Red Lodge and prompted evacuations.	
Jericho Creek	Powell	2,068	May 13	June 3	Burned in Helena-Lewis and Clark National Forest 16 miles (26 km) southwest of Helena.	
Bradshaw	Powder River	2,689	May 26	May 31	Coal-seam fire that burned 35 miles (56 km) southwest of Broadus.	
Anticline	Wibaux, Prairie	1,217	May 28	May 31	Undetermined cause. Burned in Wibaux.	
Silvertip	Flathead	6,847	July 24	15%	Lightning-caused. Burning in Bob Marshall Wilderness.	
Elder 1	Missoula	1,235	July 24	August 5	Burned southwest of Frenchtown.	
Moose	Granite	5,965	July 26	10%	Lightning-caused. Burning 24 miles (39 km) southwest of Philipsburg and prompting evacuations.	
Skillet	Flathead, Lincoln	3,384	July 29	82%	Lightning-caused. Burning west of Olney and prompted evacuations.	
Bobcat Lakes	Beaverhead	10,030	July 31	40%	Unknown cause. Burning 12 miles (19 km) east of Wisdom and prompting evacuations.	
Sand Creek	Beaverhead	33,088	August 1	14%	Unknown cause. Burning 7.6 miles (12.2 km) southwest of Wisdom and prompting evacuations.	
Black Bear	Ravalli	2,126	August 1	22%	Lightning-caused. Burning 15 miles (24 km) east of Hamilton.	
Middle Coulee	Chouteau	1,517	August 2	0%	Burning east of Floweree.	
Windmill	Stillwater, Sweet Grass	4,253	August 19	August 24	Undetermined cause. Burning in Reed Point and prompted evacuations.	
Camp Creek	Lewis and Clark, Powell	6,436	August 21	0%	Closing portions of Lewis and Clark National Forest and Clark National Forest.	
