= 2026 Mississippi wildfires =

Natural disasters in the USA

The 2026 Mississippi wildfires are a series of active wildfires currently ongoing in Mississippi.

== Background ==
While the typical "fire season" in Mississippi varies every year based on weather conditions, most wildfires occur in between January–March and July–November. However, hotter, drier conditions can allow wildfires to start outside of the typical fire period. Wildfires are most prevalent between January and March. Vegetation is abundant during these periods, while overall conditions typically result in a humid subtropical climate. The increase of vegetation (fuel) and reduced moisture levels can make the fires spread easier.

== List of wildfires ==
The following is a list of fires that burned more than 1,000 acres (400 ha), produced significant structural damage, or resulted in casualties.

Name	County	Acres	Start date	Containment date	Notes	Ref.
Tiger Tank	Perry	1,800	February 19	February 19		
Range 6	Perry	2,160	February 22	February 23		
Big Hungry	Carroll	4,030	March 27	March 31	3rd largest in Mississippi history (was 2nd, surpassed by smoke show fire)	
Smoke Show	Perry	4,896	April 13	0%	2nd largest in Mississippi history	
Range 39	Perry	2,517	August 5	August 8		
Bayou Cumbest	Jackson	1,428	August 16	85%	Prompted evacuations and impacted air quality in Pascagoula.	
