= 2026 South Dakota wildfires =

Series of wildfires

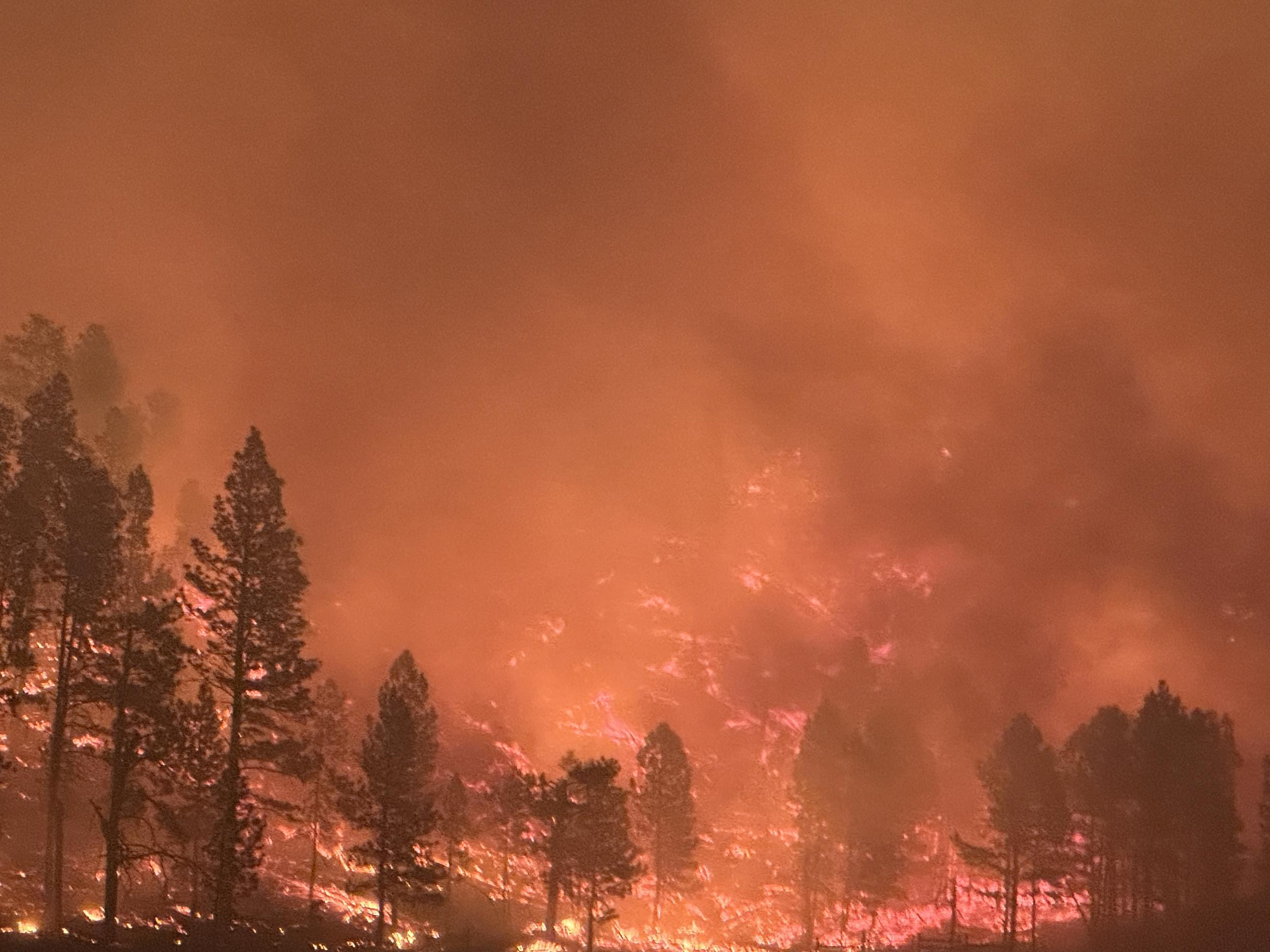
- The Qury Fire on the evening of March 12

The 2026 South Dakota wildfires are a series of active wildfires currently ongoing in South Dakota.

== Background ==
While "fire season" varies every year in South Dakota, most wildfires occur between February and April and June and August. However, there is an increasing fire danger year-round. Fire conditions can be exacerbated by drought, strong winds, and vegetation growth. Climate change is leading to increased temperatures, lower humidity levels, and drought conditions are happening more often. Additionally, warmer temperatures and less precipitation can result in less snowmelt, further contributing to bad wildfire conditions. The previous winter (2025-2026) was one of the warmest and driest on record in South Dakota, increasing the risk of wildfires.

== List of wildfires ==
The following is a list of fires that burned more than 1,000 acres (400 ha), produced significant structural damage, or resulted in casualties.

Name	County	Acres	Start date	Containment date	Notes	Ref.
Qury	Custer	9,168	March 12	May 7	Caused evacuations for Custer. Approximately 10 properties were affected with structures being either damaged or destroyed.	
79	Custer	5,408	April 11	April 14		
Thomas Ranch	Sully	1,800	April 22	April 24		
Taber Rec	Bon Homme	1,573	April 22	April 26		
Bauman	Jackson	3,178	April 22	May 4		
Fb 17	Todd	1,188	April 23	May 3		
Guide	Oglala Lakota	1,104	May 2	May 7	Burned 5 miles (8.0 km) north of Loneman.	
Potato Creek	Jackson, Oglala Lakota	10,944	July 27	August 6	Lightning-caused. Burned 4 miles (6.4 km) northwest of Potato Creek.	
XU Hill	Oglala Lakota	1,297	August 11	95%	Lightning-caused. Burning near Rockyford.	
