= Hawk Fire =

2026 wildfire in Nevada

- Part of the 2026 Nevada wildfires
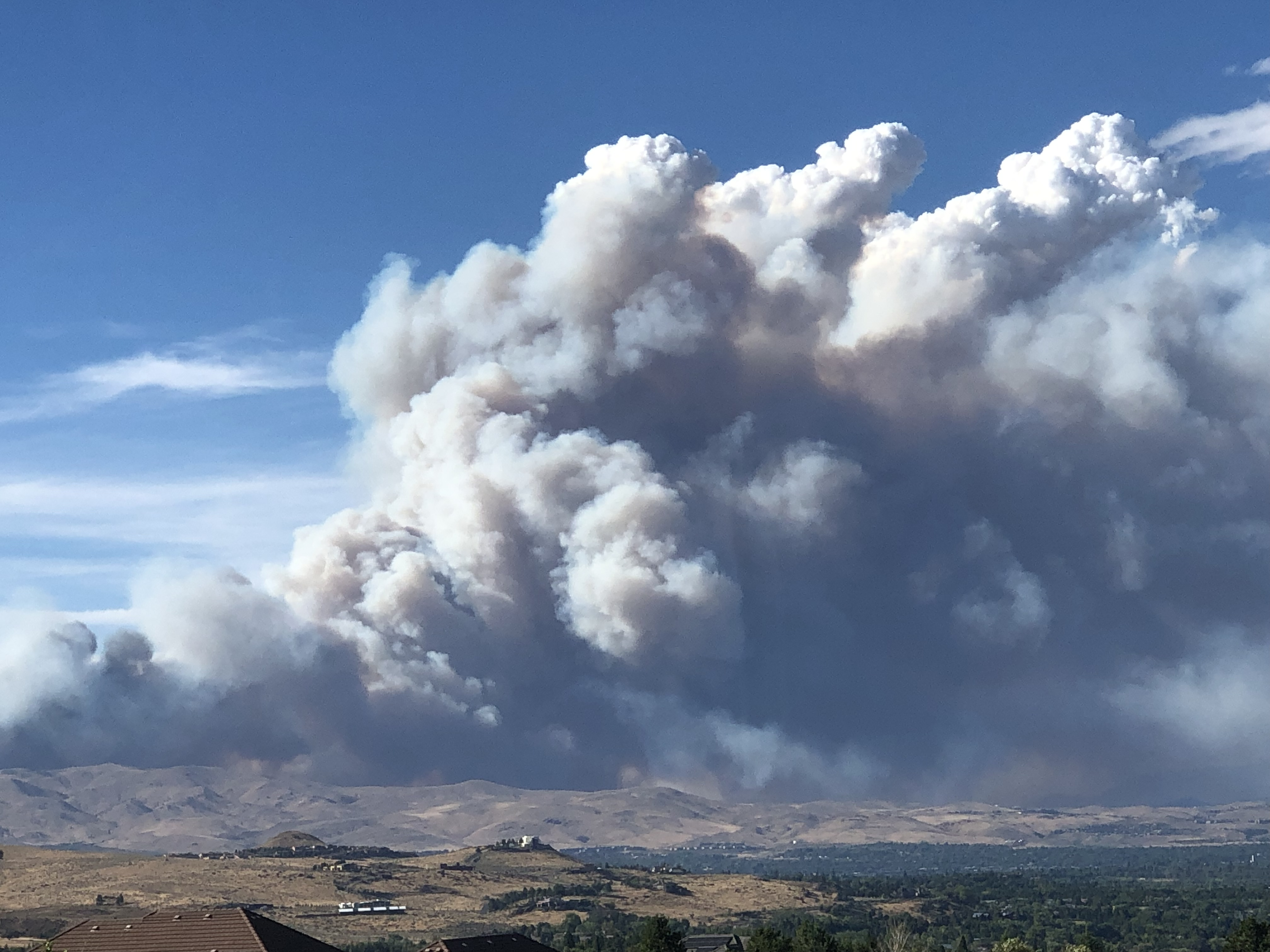
- Clockwise from top: Smoke clouds from the Hawk Fire on August 22; burn scar from the Hawk Fire on the northern slopes of Peavine Peak, seen on October 30, 2026; comparison of burned and unburned land along the eastern perimeter, seen on November 7, 2026; a panoramic photo of the Hawk Fire on August 22; aerial view of the southern side of the burn scar on August 4; smoke clouds from the Hawk Fire at sunset, soon after it jumped U.S. Route 395
- Date: August 22 – September 9, 2026
- Location: Peavine Peak, Nevada, United States
- Coordinates: 39.586920217°N 119.932138508°W

Statistics
- Perimeter: 100% contained
- Burned area: 15,085 acres (6,105 ha)

Impacts
- Deaths: 1 civilian
- Injuries: 3 firefighters 3 civilians
- Evacuated: 42,000
- Structures destroyed: 48 destroyed 8 damaged
- Cost: $15.4 million (suppression)

Ignition
- Cause: Under investigation; human-caused

The Hawk Fire was a wildfire that burned in Humboldt–Toiyabe National Forest on Peavine Peak, just outside of Reno, Nevada, United States. Preceded by two large regional wildfires earlier that month, the fire ignited around 11:30 am Pacific Daylight Time (PDT) (Note: All times are in Pacific Daylight Time (PDT) unless otherwise noted.) on August 22, 2026. It rapidly spread due to weather conditions that contributed to a red flag warning. It was fully contained (Note: Containment measures control lines around a fire's perimeter that the fire should not cross. When a fire reaches 100% containment, a line has been built around the fire perimeter. Containment does not mean a hazard no longer exists in or around the fire perimeter or the fire has stopped burning.) on September 9. The Hawk Fire became the most destructive wildfire in Nevada history after destroying forty-seven residential structures and one commercial and damaging an additional eight homes.

The region had seen several recent wildfires, including the Bug and Stallion fires. The Reno metropolitan area suffered from a record-low snowpack following the 2025–26 winter. The United States Drought Monitor mapped the region as undergoing moderate drought on August 25. A red flag warning was issued across Western Nevada on August 22 due to high temperatures (peaking 90–100 °F (32–38 °C)), humidity predicted to be as low as 12 percent, and strong winds that gusted up to 35 miles per hour (56 km/h) on Peavine Peak. Wind drove the fire into dry vegetation and timber, particularly the invasive species cheatgrass.

Evacuation orders and warnings (Note: An evacuation warning signifies there is a potential threat to life or property and an evacuation order is a lawful order to evacuate due to immediate threat to life or property.) were issued in and around Reno, Cold Springs, and Lemmon Valley on August 22. U.S. Route 395 was closed that evening, and it reopened on August 24. The wind changed directions several times, complicating suppression efforts. The Hawk Fire was mapped at 15,039.9 acres (6,086.4 ha) on August 23. Containment was achieved on the southern edge of the fire on August 24, resulting in officials lifting some evacuations. Containment increased to 85 percent on August 25. All roads were reopened and most evacuations lifted on August 26; the final evacuations were lifted on September 3. Residents and media outlets criticized the response, reporting they did not receive evacuation notices, information was not sufficiently communicated, and the evacuation process was dangerous and inefficient.

All the structures destroyed by the Hawk Fire were in the North Valleys subdivisions, (Note: The Washoe County Citizen Advisory Board ward for the North Valleys includes the northernmost stretch of U.S. Route 395 in Nevada north of Peavine Peak, northwest of Sun Valley.) including the North Valleys Self Storage facility, which was destroyed by the fire. Suppression efforts cost $15.4 million. (Note: All monetary values are in 2026 USD unless otherwise noted.) Nevada Governor Joe Lombardo declared a state of emergency, and President Donald Trump signed a Presidential Emergency Declaration. The Washoe County School District canceled nearly all schools in the county on August 24 and 25, and Truckee Meadows Community College also closed those days. Northern Nevada Health Systems closed two hospitals, and Renown Health closed multiple locations. Reno Stead Airport temporarily closed to non-military or firefighting aircraft. Three firefighters were injured during the initial response. Three civilians were injured and one died. The Hawk Fire burn scar poses a threat of landslides and flooding. Several native plant ecosystems were damaged, with some expected to take several decades to fully recover.

== Background ==
The Reno metropolitan area's "fire season" typically occurs in the summer months. While few wildfires occur in the city limits due to limited vegetations, the heavy forests outside the city fuel long-lasting and intense wildfires. The native vegetation of Peavine Peak (an outlying peak of the Sierra Nevada) varies by elevation and direction of slope because the western slopes of the mountain receive the bulk of precipitation. The western foothills are largely covered in ponderosa pine and mountain mahogany. Sagebrush, antelope brush, and desert peach dominate the hills north and south of the mountain. Natural canyon winds influenced the Hawk Fire's initial spread. In recent years, several wildfires have burned on Peavine Peak and its foothills, including the 2020 Poeville Fire and two small wildfires earlier in 2026, the 100-acre (40 ha) Peavine Fire in late July and the 111-acre (45 ha) Moose Ridge Fire in early August. The Poeville Fire burn scar resulted in minimal surface vegetation in the northeastern part of the Hawk Fire burn scar, resulting in the land burning at low intensity with little change to existing vegetative conditions. The Bug Fire started further north of the Hawk Fire on August 8, burning nearly 94,000 acres (38,000 ha) and destroying nine residential structures. It was 94 percent contained when the Hawk Fire started. The Stallion Fire that burned over 40,000 acres (16,000 ha) near Pyramid Lake started on August 10 and was 98 percent contained when the Hawk Fire started. Both were human-caused.

The Washoe Zephyr is a routine, local wind that occurs in the Truckee Meadows, often occurring in the summer months. In the afternoon and evening, warm air rises from the ground, traveling west as it cools and sinks near the Sierra Nevada. This lowers atmospheric pressure in the Truckee Meadows. This sinking motion creates higher atmospheric pressure near the Sierra Nevada, and the movement of air from high pressure to low pressure creates wind.

A 2020 climate change assessment by the United States Forest Service (USFS) has shown snowfall and runoff time in the area of the Hawk Fire has been decreasing. The region experienced a record low snowpack during the 2025–26 winter, with the Reno metropolitan area described as experiencing a "snow drought". The first measurable snowfall (Note: The National Weather Service defines measurable snowfall as a snowfall event with at least 0.1 inches (2.5 mm) of snow accumulation.) at Reno–Tahoe International Airport fell on January 8, 2026. Much of the Western United States was experiencing drought, and all of Washoe County had been under moderate drought on August 25. (Note: The United States Drought Monitor classifies dry or drought-stricken areas in five levels: D0 means "abnormally dry" and D4 means "exceptional drought". D1, or moderate drought, is generally classified as 10.01 or 20.00 percentile for precipitation.)

A red flag warning was issued from 11 am to 11 pm on August 22 across portions of Western Nevada and Lassen County, California; predictions showed winds blowing 15–25 miles per hour (24–40 km/h), gusting up to 40 miles per hour (64 km/h), and humidity as low as 18 percent. Ultimately, winds on Peavine Peak gusted up to 35 miles per hour (56 km/h) that day. Across Northern Nevada, temperatures peaked between 90 and 100 °F (32 and 38 °C) and the low temperatures ranged from 60–70 °F (16–21 °C). The Reno metropolitan area lay on the outer bands of a high-pressure system centered south of Lake Tahoe. After ignition, the Hawk Fire was driven by the strong wind and sere vegetation. These strong winds drove the Hawk Fire into areas of very dry, fine fuels (Note: Fine fuels include pine needles, leaves, and grasses, live or dead. To be characterized as "fine", they are typically under 0.25 inches (6.4 mm) in diameter and gain or lose moisture within one hour. They are receptive to wildfire ignition and spread.) and timber, particularly the invasive species cheatgrass.

The Hawk Fire burned and spread into a densely populated wildland-urban interface, an area where residential neighborhoods lie near fire-prone wild areas. The Yale School of the Environment described this wildland-urban interface as "half-wild, half-suburban". This leaves little space between structures and wildfires. Reno's population grew 26 percent between 2010 and 2025. This influx of growth has driven residential expansions into previously wildland areas in a dry environment. The Somersett neighborhood, which lies south of where the Hawk Fire started, has been expanding into a wildland-urban interface. The base of Peavine Peak is surrounded by residential and commercial developments. Because human assets are at risk, natural fires that clear excess vegetation are suppressed rapidly, creating a buildup of fuels. Leading up to the Hawk Fire, Truckee Meadows Fire Protection District had spent several million dollars to remove dry, dead, or excessive vegetation in the area. Wildfires spreading into residential areas akin to the Hawk Fire also make structure protection more difficult for first responders.

The State of Nevada passed Assembly Bill 376 in June 2025 that permits private insurers to exclude wildfire policies from standard homeowners policies. The bill took effect on January 1, 2026. Insurance Business reported the Hawk Fire was the policy's "first major test". The State of Nevada reported no insurance companies had dropped standard wildfire insurance policies by September 11, 2026. One resident whose house was destroyed could not find an insurance company that would insure him because of the high wildfire risk. Preliminary estimates by the Nevada Division of Insurance show 2,245 wildfire insurance policies were canceled or not renewed in 2025.

Peavine Peak is primarily composed of Jurassic-age metavolcanic rock and Cretaceous-age pluton of the Sierra Nevada Batholith. On the west and northwest sides of the mountain, the metavolcanic rock forms soils with high fracture rates, leading to high vegetation growth on soil and a minmized sediment load. The intrusive granodiorite near the western edge of the fire is naturally erosive and forms sandier soils. The younger sedimentary and igneous rock on the southern edge of the mountain is naturally prone to erosion, sediment loading, and shallow landslides. (Note: A shallow landslide originates in the upper layers of rock and soil, often on steep edges. They are rapid, triggered by sustained intense rainfall.) The Peavine Fault on the mountain's northeast side causes steep drainages that lead to alluvial fan deposits. The rocks on eastern Peavine Peak have undergone hydrothermal alteration and contain veins of copper, silver, and gold where the fire burned over several abandoned mines and an active lode mine. Human activities related to the mines has exposed volcanic soils, leading to localized sediment erosion. The eastern side of the mountain also contains steep watersheds.

== Cause ==
Timelapse video of the Hawk Fire burning up Peavine Peak on August 22

Resources began responding to the Hawk Fire shortly before 11:25 am on August 22, 2026. As of October 2026, The exact cause is undetermined and under investigation, but officials have confirmed the Hawk Fire is human-caused. An investigation is underway to determine a suspect for igniting the fire, either intentional or accidental. The Secret Witness service released on August 27 that they would give $2,500 to people who could provide information on who may have started the Hawk Fire, with the agency's chairman stating that approximately one dozen tips had been sent in by mid-October.

== Progression ==
A vegetation fire was estimated at 15 acres (6.1 ha) and on-scene units via radio traffic stated it was moving at "a rapid rate of spread". The fire's proximity to Hawk Meadow Trail led to its designation as the "Hawk Fire" by 11:51 am, when the fire was reported at 30 to 40 acres (12 to 16 ha). An evacuation order was soon ordered for a sparsely populated area, followed with several evacuation warnings west of U.S. Route 395 in Lemmon Valley, Stead, and Golden Valley and parts of Sierra County, California along the state border. Around 2 pm, the incident commander requested an additional ten fire engines, two bulldozers, and two hand crews (Note: A hand crew from the California Department of Forestry and Fire Protection typically consists of one fire captain, one fire apparatus engineer, and about fourteen wildland firefighters.) from the California Department of Forestry and Fire Protection (CAL FIRE). Around this time, the Hawk Fire was estimated at 2,500 acres (1,000 ha). The fire was threatening an estimated 1,000 residential structures, pushing northeast towards North Virginia Street between the Seneca and Copperfield neighborhoods. An evacuation center opened at the Evelyn Mount Community Center in central Reno. The evacuation warnings were upgraded to evacuation orders approximately one hour later. Soon after, new evacuation orders were issued northwest of the fire south of U.S. Route 395. Evacuation warnings were issued north of U.S. Route 395, including some zones in southern Cold Springs.

View of the Hawk Fire from south Reno at approximately 10:30 pm

Radio traffic around 5:38 pm indicated the fire was approaching North Virginia Street near Mohawk Lane, and North Virginia Street was requested to be closed between Golden Valley Road and Red Rock Road. Another evacuation warning was issued in the Panther Valley neighborhood. All evacuations warning zones (aside from the aforementioned zone in Panther Valley) were upgraded to evacuation order zones by 6:39 pm. Radio traffic recorded the Hawk Fire jumped U.S. Route 395 near Peppermint Drive around 7:19 pm, soon mapped at 8,020.7 acres (3,245.9 ha) by CAL FIRE aircraft. Additional evacuation orders and warnings were issued by 8 pm. Evacuation warnings extended south into Verdi and Somersett, east up to North McCarran Boulevard and towards Sun Valley, and further north in Cold Springs and the Silver Knolls neighborhood. Evacuation orders were issued further north in Lemmon Valley and warnings further north in Cold Springs and the Silver Knolls neighborhood. U.S. Route 395 was closed from Parr Boulevard to Red Rock Road near the California–Nevada state line. Another evacuation center was established at the Reno-Sparks Convention Center after the Evelyn Mount Center reached capacity, and it sheltered over 450 evacuees overnight. Evacuation warnings were upgraded to orders in Somersett that night. Additional evacuation warnings were issued south and east of the McCarran Boulevard ring road, and Rancho San Rafael Regional Park closed. Evacuation routes out of Somersett were congested, with travel times between Somersett and downtown Reno reported at over one hour. Governor Joe Lombardo declared a state of emergency for the Hawk Fire, directing state resources to contribute to local efforts via the Nevada Emergency Operations Center. Roughly 400 local, state, and federal firefighters were assigned to the incident, with a team of Australian firefighters previously assigned to the Shoshone Fire in Churchill County called in that night. It was mapped at 10,522 acres (4,258 ha) later that night. Evacuations expanded overnight, north, east, and south of the fire's perimeter. The wind repeatedly changed directions and jumped over fire engines, complicating direct suppression efforts.

Suppression vehicles on the Hawk Fire on August 23, 2026

The Washoe County Regional Animal Services opened as a small animal shelter, and the Ironwood Events Center functioned as a large animal shelter. U.S. Route 395 remained closed overnight and into the morning. Overnight, NV Energy re-energized approximately 50,000 customers, but 250 customers south and west of U.S. Route 395 remained without gas. The Hawk Fire was estimated at 13,000 acres (5,300 ha) that morning. An estimated 800 personnel were assigned to the fire, including California hotshot crews and ten aerial firefighting aircraft began combatting the fire around 8:30 am. Some firefighters and aerial resources had been previously responding to the Bug and Stallion fires. Evacuation orders and warnings were confirmed to encompass just under 90,000 residents. The Hawk Fire continued spreading west towards Long Valley in Sierra County. California Governor Gavin Newsom posted on X that morning, "We're closely monitoring the #HawkFire" and the Sierra County Sheriff's Office was "closely monitoring fire conditions." Several aerial assets were concentrated on the western edge of the fire throughout the afternoon, mapped at 15,039.9 acres (6,086.4 ha) by the NIFC by 3:05 pm. "Extreme fire behavior" was seen during the fire's large runs through heavy fuels.

The Hawk Fire continued making runs in areas of dense fuels. An additional 3,000 customers were re-energized, including almost all residents in Somersett and Mogul. A containment line was established along the southern perimeter near Somersett, resulting in containment increasing to 27 percent; evacuation orders were reduced to evacuation warnings in Somersett, and evacuation warnings further south were lifted. The number of residents under evacuation orders decreased from 42,000 to 23,000. Authorities reportedly stated, "[we] have are having issues with drones", with one identified where the fire jumped U.S. Route 395. Several evacuation orders were reduced to warnings east of U.S. Route 395, near the White Lake and Granite Peak communities. U.S. Route 395 and all its exit ramps (aside from the North Virginia Street exit) reopened that afternoon. A community meeting took place at Idlewild Park that evening.

The Hawk Fire was mapped at 15,066.8 acres (6,097.3 ha) early on August 25. The evacuation warnings issued in Sierra County were lifted by 8:26 am. One evacuation order zone south of U.S. Route 395 was reduced to a warning, and Reno Stead Airport reopened to general aviation operations. Evacuation orders were reduced to evacuation warnings north and east of U.S. Route 395, along with evacuation orders in around Golden Valley, Rancho San Rafael Regional Park, and the Raleigh Heights neighborhood. Containment increased to 85 percent, and forward progress (Note: Forward progress is the complete stop of a wildfire's spread. It does not necessarily mean the fire is fully contained or extinguished.) was stopped. Suppression efforts between August 22 and August 25 cost up to $8.8 million. All road closures and most evacuation orders were lifted on August 26, and the final evacuations were lifted on September 3. The Hawk Fire reached 100 percent containment on September 9.

An unrelated wildfire dubbed the Bull Fire started west of the Hawk Fire burn scar on October 2, 2026. Driven head-on into the Hawk Fire burn scar, it functioned as a natural containment feature that assisted firefighters. The Bull Fire was fully contained on October 15 after growing to 1,529 acres (619 ha).

== Criticism of response ==
Evacuation traffic backed up on North Virginia Street

Several residents across the Reno metropolitan area were upset that there was minimal communication by first responders, primarily the local government, in the initial 48 hours of the Hawk Fire. They reported they retrieved most information online and through social media. A member of the press asked the Reno Fire Department Incident Commander about the lack of response during the August 24 meeting at Idlewild Park. He stated, "We have been here 48 hours since this fire started and the amount of ground that fire covered with multiple fronts affecting two geographic parts of our valley" and stated the local agencies had been communicating information "as fast as we possibly can". News agency This is Reno reported they did not receive any news releases of evacuations until management of the fire was transitioned to federal agencies. One resident stated "It's almost like we had way too much irrelevant information and not enough actual, concrete information". Residents also complained that officials did not leave time for audience questions at in-person and online meetings. This is Reno also criticized government officials for "self-congratulatory" videos related to the response. A letter written by the Nevada Press Association also criticized officials' reliance on social media (particularly Facebook), which was not accessible to all evacuees. The letter was also concerned how information was not communicated to local news agencies until after evacuations were ordered. The Nevada Press Association noted the Washoe County Sheriff's Office directed residents to unofficial websites and that the Nevada Division of Forestry pointed residents to seven different sources of information. Bethany Drysdale, the Washoe County Public Information Officer, admitted "we needed to move the information faster". The county said the concerns brought up in the letter would be investigated during an after-action regional review.

A member of the Reno City Council who evacuated criticized that several evacuation routes were under construction, several traffic lights were malfunctioning, and there were "miles of cars" on evacuation routes. One resident said there were not enough roads to efficiently evacuate the apartments where the Hawk Fire burned. An evacuee in Lemmon Valley reported being stuck in traffic for four hours and evacuating through dirt roads. The Reno Police Chief believed that closing U.S. Route 395 only to oncoming traffic and keeping it open for thru and exiting traffic would have made the evacuation process more efficient. He told KOLO-TV, "The fact that we didn't have more deaths is amazing given the conditions that we saw out there that day".

The son of one man who suffered burns when his trailer was burned reported the burn victims never received any evacuation alerts on their cell phones. The man, who lived in the trailer with his girlfriend and her aunt, received bad burns; his girlfriend's aunt later succumbed. The Washoe County Emergency Management Administrator issued public alerts: push notifications were sent to registered cell phones, but broadcast alerts through the Emergency Alert System (EAS) did not. Rave, a subsidiary of Motorola, told the Emergency Management Administrator the option to send out EAS alerts was not checked, but the administrator has contradicted this claim. A researcher with the University of Colorado Boulder's Natural Hazards Center told the radio station KUNR that many residents did not receive the push notifications because they had not registered their cell phone. The former chairperson of the Nevada Emergency Alert System said residents did not receive the messages because wireless service providers did not sufficiently implement the system.

== Effects ==
=== Damage and injuries ===
Burned storage container at North Valleys Self Storage, seen from U.S. Route 395 on October 30, 2026

On August 22, then mayor of Reno Hillary Schieve stated on X, "structures have already been burned in this fire". Forty-seven residential structures and one commercial structure were destroyed and eight were damaged, making the Hawk Fire the most destructive wildfire in Nevada history. All structures destroyed were in the North Valleys, including North Valleys Self Storage. One taxidermy shop in a resident's backyard was destroyed, although the owner's house was not destroyed. The initial damage assessment released on August 24 tallied thirty-two structures destroyed and six damaged. Northern Nevada Public Health declared a local public health emergency on August 28 following the Bug, Hawk, and Stallion fires. It advised residents who suffered damage to avoid debris removal due to hazardous materials, ash, and debris. The disaster recovery company Bright Harbor reported 13 of the 59 victims who self-reported damage had no wildfire insurance. One resident whose house was destroyed reported he would be unlikely to find wildfire insurance with the rising prices following the Hawk Fire.

NV Energy de-energized approximately 59,000 electrical customers and 250 gas customers. Geographically widespread outages occurred so the company could maintain power grid stability after multiple important transmission facilities were impacted by the Hawk Fire. NV Energy restored all power by 4:15 pm on August 27. The Truckee Donner Public Utility District (whose transmission lines are fed by NV Energy) reported nearly 15,000 power outages near Truckee, California, but all customers were re-energized by August 23. Liberty Utilities de-energized about 22,000 customers in and around the community Glenshire and Loyalton, California. The company reported all power was restored by August 23. Customers in the North Lake Tahoe region also experienced power outages. Over 100 power poles belonging to NV Energy were destroyed. The company sent 11 crews to repair its damaged gas and power infrastructure.

The Nevada National Guard mobilized 60 troops to guard evacuated neighborhoods. Governor Joe Lombardo issued a state of emergency on August 22. That day, the State of Nevada submitted a request to the Federal Emergency Management Agency (FEMA) for a Fire Management Assistance Grant. It was accepted, allowing for FEMA to financially cover the cost of up to 75 percent of the suppression efforts that ultimately cost $15.4 million. On August 28, Lombardo requested a Presidential Emergency Declaration from Donald Trump; it was signed on September 2. The declaration permits FEMA to provide technical assistance and subject professionals to residents through the recovery process. The Hawk and Bug fires also prompted the Small Business Administration to declare Nevada a disaster area on September 11, allowing homeowners, renters, and businesses to apply for federal disaster loans. Several charities and the Red Cross also helped victims of the Hawk Fire, distributing food and household items.

In total, three firefighters and three citizens were injured. All three firefighters received minor burns during the initial response. An 83-year-old woman who was transferred to University of California, Davis Medical Center succumbed to her injuries on August 27. The woman killed, along with her niece and niece's boyfriend, suffered the burns when their trailer was run over by flames.

=== Closures and evacuations ===
Roughly 14,000 residential structures were placed under evacuation orders. An estimated 42,000 residents were in evacuation order zones and 45,000 separate residents in evacuation warning zones. Evacuation orders and warnings were issued south to the Somersett neighborhood and Verdi, east towards Sun Valley along North McCarran Boulevard, and north into Cold Springs, Stead, and Lemmon Valley. Several casino resorts offered discounted rates to evacuees, although evacuees were unable to find hotel rooms or accommodations for pets. The initial evacuation order zone included railroad tracks belonging to Union Pacific Railroad, prompting railroad safety concerns. Nevada Attorney General Aaron Ford's office received reports of price gouging while many residents were evacuated.

The evacuation order zone lay just outside of the main campus of University of Nevada, Reno (UNR). Many students and staff were under evacuation notices, and some student apartments were in evacuation warning zones. The university held classes for the first day of the fall semester on August 24, but some teachers reported classes at half attendance. KTVN interviewed two students who disapproved of the university's decisions. Truckee Meadows Community College canceled in-person and remote classes on August 24 and 25, the first two days of the fall semester. The Washoe County School District (WCSD) closed all schools (aside from schools in Incline Village and Gerlach K–12 School) on August 24 and 25. Thirteen schools were closed on August 26. Several private schools also closed. The Children's Discovery Museum lowered admission to $5 while schools were canceled.

Renown Health closed several of its locations, including two urgent care centers and two UNR University Health locations. Northern Nevada Health Systems also evacuated and closed ER at North Valleys and Northwest Specialty Hospital. Both were evacuated on August 22 and reopened on August 28. Reno Stead Airport temporarily closed to general aviation operations, remaining open only to military and firefighting aircraft. North Valleys Regional Park and Rancho San Rafael Regional Park were also closed and evacuated. Washoe County officials closely monitored the fire and its proximity to the Washoe County Jail. Personnel from the Washoe County Sheriff's Office were mobilized to prepare for a potential evacuation and "everybody [was] on standby".

=== Environmental impacts ===
Satellite view of the Hawk Fire on August 22, showing smoke drifting northeast across Northern Nevada

Smoke from the Hawk Fire drifted across Nevada due to prevailing winds, so smoke impacts were minimal in California and around Lake Tahoe. Smoke lingered in the Reno metropolitan area, but was forecast to clear up due to windier conditions on August 25. That day, the Reno Gazette-Journal wrote that smoke was a potential concern for the Burning Man event that started on August 30.

==== Geologic concerns ====
View of the southern part of the Hawk Fire burn scar at sunrise on November 3, 2026. (Note: A portion of the lower blackened part of the mountain is from the Moose Ridge Fire.)

The Hawk Fire burned over several abandoned mine lands, including several that were burned over at moderate to severe intensity. Seven of the abandoned mine land sites in the burn scar are known to have closures within the mine due to hazardous polyurethane foam.Such closure areas were investigated for damage, but none received any fire damage and accessibility or visibility did not change, but the abandoned mine land sites were left surrounded by little vegetation.

Natural drainage has occurred in the steep watersheds in the southern part of the burn scar, creating deep gullies in volcanic soil. Granitics on the western edge of the fire that are naturally vulnerable to rockfalls and erosion have seen isolated sliding and rockfalls. Areas with granitics that have seen sliding are relatively flat and burned at low intensity. Debris flow was reported at the base of several steep slopes, particularly those near Bull Ranch Creek. The debris fan (Note: A debris fan is a triangular landform formed near the intersection of a tributary valley and a larger valley from deposition.) was reported to be very stable, wide, and flat, with minimal stream dissection. Erosion and debris slides presented temporary local hazards to water quality and stream capacity.

Soil burn severity map of the Hawk Fire

In conjunction with a geologist from the University of Nevada, Reno and a hydrologist from the National Weather Service, the burned area emergency response team (BAER) predicted maximum rainfall thresholds (Note: A rainfall threshold is the measure or severity of rainfall required to induce a "sediment-related disaster".) at 1.2 inches (30 mm) per hour within one year and 1.7 inches (43 mm) within two years. Several watersheds were reported to have a high risk of geologic hazards but did not have the steep slopes or sediment loading to facilitate debris flows during routine periods of precipitation. The Jenne and Indian ravines on the eastern side of Peavine Peak both face a 60–80% risk of debris flow during rain events of 1.26 inches (32 mm) per hour. These ravines have already transported sediment, seen alluvial fan deposits. Most riparian vegetation in the Jenne Ravine is largely unburned, minimizing major flood flows and sediment deposits. Copper Canyon is the geographic feature with the highest debris flow combined hazard burned by the Hawk Fire. Fine sediment lies downstream and the channel's headwaters are laden with fine sediment. On the western side of Peavine Peak, the BAER team forecast a 40–60 percent chance of a sediment-induced event occurring in the Brooklyn Creek Watershed in 1.26 inches (32 mm) of hourly rain. It is composed of erosive rocks that produce high volumes of sediment in shallow landslides and sediment loads in the creek's primary channels. However, the gradient of the slope (found with LiDAR imagery) is under 23 percent, so debris flows from Brooklyn Creek cannot impact infrastructure. The Bull Ranch Creek Watershed was also found to have a 40–60 percent chance of sediment-induced events in similar conditions. Debris flow found at the base of the creek's headwaters that do not expand onto the alluvial fan, and it does not show signs of debris levees. The Jones Creek Watershed was shown to have a 40–60 percent chance of sediment-induced events during periods of 1.26 inches (32 mm) of hourly rain. The drainage basins had high concentrations of land that burned at moderate to high intensity. The lower portion of the watershed has slope gradients between 10 and 30 percent, high enough to support debris flow transport.

Soil burn severity from the Hawk Fire (Note: An additional 99 acres (40 ha) burned on developed land.)
Severity level	Area	Percent of burned area
Very low/unburned	981 acres (397 ha)	7%
Low	12,602 acres (5,100 ha)	84%
Moderate	1,182 acres (478 ha)	8%
High	223 acres (90 ha)	1%

LiDAR imagery showed slope gradients below 23 percent and long landslide runout slope gradients under 10 percent, (Note: Landslide runout is generally measured as the height-to-length ratio that is often influenced by the slope.) leading the BAER team to determine the chance of debris flows is low across most of the burn scar. The BAER team concluded debris flows from stream headwaters are unlikely to extend beyond the base of the major headwaters. At the time the BAER report was published in mid-September, shallow landslides prevailed as the most common geologic hazard observed. It is expected to increase where the Hawk Fire has stripped surface vegetation and increased hydrophobicity, but the BAER team reported debris flow chances were unlikely to increase with time. Very few trails or roads are located adjacent to steep slopes (generally at least 35 percent slope gradient) with rockfall hazard. Several recreational roads and trails run beneath steep watersheds, and multiple unauthorized off-road vehicle trails pass through hazardous slopes and watersheds, potentially presenting a fatal risk to users during periods of intense rainfall. Hydrophobicity levels were generally inconsistent across the burn scar across varying levels of burn severity.

Heat absorption from darker burned ash and soil, combined with strong mountain winds typical just east of the Sierra Nevada, created ash and dust devils in the burn scar. They were predicted to continue until wetting rains in the fall. These redistributed ash and soil across the burn scar. Additional wind erosion is likely to impact the burn scar until vegetation recovery.

==== Hydrologic impacts ====
Hawk Fire soil burn severity map, zoomed out to show impacted drainage basins and their tributaries

Several United States Forest Service (USFS) sites lying in floodplains and other low-lying areas are threatened by runoff, floating debris, erosion, and sedimentation. Hazardous watershed response is expected to impact USFS roads, including Forest Service Roads 41128, 41643 and 41419 that are well-used access routes tfor recreation and forest management purposes. Hiking trails and campsites, especially those near low-lying water crossings now vulnerable to flooding, may present a bodily risk. Slope failure, woody debris falls, and increased sediment delivery could damage Forest Service roads and structures below. An employee of the Northern Nevada Red Cross warned about mud slides and flooding near the Hawk Fire burn scar in late October 2026, at a time some homeowners were still rebuilding and clearing debris.

The varying elevation and topography of the Hawk Fire burn scar (peaking at roughly 8,280 feet (2,520 m) on Peavine Peak and 5,100 feet (1,600 m) near Red Rock Road) leads to a variation in the average snowfall between impacted watersheds. Peavine Peak's north-northwest–south-southeast ridge serves as the headwaters of six Hydrological Unit Code (HUC) areas. The Hawk Fire burned portions of twelve watersheds, including the Hunter Creek HUC, which is mostly private land that lies over Somersett that drains in the Truckee River. On USFS lands in the western part of the burn scar, three HUCs were impacted: the Cold Spring Valley, Long Valley Creek, and Bull Ranch Creek (the lattermost of which drains into the Truckee River) HUCs. The majority of area burned in these HUC watersheds burned at very low intensity.

When wildfires modify soil structure and vegetation cover, they increase runoff, erosion, and peak flow. (Note: Peak flows, also known as high flow statistics, are estimates of the highest flow event streams or rivers predicted to occur over a given amount of time.) While trees with remaining canopies often lead to ground cover and protection in burn areas due to needle shedding, the Hawk Fire burned in an area dominated by ground vegetation that was stripped and trees suffered canopy loss, even in areas that burned at low severity. The BAER team calculated 97.6 percent of the burn area does not have remaining canopies.

Floodwater is likely to be contaminated with ash and sediment, increasing the volume of runoff. This could bypass or+ negatively impact infrastructure designed to handle typical flooding. Bulking factors (Note: Bulking refers to when displaced geologic material has a large volume than the hole it was displaced from.) were applied at 1.25 for soil burned at low intensity, 1.55 for moderate, and 2.20 for high burn severity. Overall, bulked peak flows are anticipated to be between 1.4 and 1.6 times that of pre-fire flows. Watershed responses to the Hawk Fire are expected to transition from the initial flush of ash, rill, gully, and mass wasting erosion in steep drainages to increased peak flows and deposition.

==== Vegetation impacts ====
Anticipated vegetation recovery
Vegetation	Recovery time (in years)
Grassland	1–3
Riparian	2–8
Sagebrush	10–20
Low sagebrush	"Multiple decades"
Montane chaparral	3–5
Pine	10–50
Bitterbrush	10–30
Mountain mahogany	"Multiple decades"

Ground vegetation in areas burned at low intensity have been predicted to regrow two to three years after the Hawk Fire. Land burned at moderate or high intensity is predicted to fully recover three to forty years after the fire, attributed to soil modification and tree mortality rates. Tree canopy destruction is common across such areas. Grass and shrublands dominated land burned at low intensity at high elevations and the north, east, and south parts of the burn scar. Land burned at moderate to high severity in these areas were characterized by dense shrubs, mountain mahogany, and riparian vegetation, primarily in areas of sheltered topography or where moisture from groundwater is at the surface. Mixed forests of deciduous and coniferous species prevailed in the western part of the burn scar. Channels and surrounding land in these areas are expected to have less sediment surface runoff from pine needle and wood debris coverage. A critical habitat area was disturbed by the Hawk Fire and suppression efforts, but two dozer lines through the area have been repaired.

Low burn severity was predominant in areas previously dominated by less dense grasses, shrubs, and previously burned land. Vegetation recovery is expected to be rapid despite above-average hilltop erosion rates throughout the first winter. Soil aggregates are typically weakened in such conditions, leaving a risk of erosion during the region's routine gusty winds. Moderate burn severity was prevalent in areas of mountain mahogany, shrubland, and stands of aspen, where partial and complete canopy loss was recorded. Roots were burned at varying depths. Partially burned stands of conifers are expected to partially mitigate accelerated erosion. High burn severity was mostly seen in the northern slopes of Peavine Peak, in areas with conifers and dense groves of mountain mahogany and shrubs.

Exposed soil could cause the rapid spread of invasive species sourced from contaminated equipment and vehicles. Artificial firebreaks may have been constructed with contaminated material. Approximately 12 percent of USFS lands burned have a chance of noxious weed or invasive species outbreaks.

== Growth and containment table ==
Fire containment status Gray: contained; Red: active; %: percent contained;
Date	Area burned	Personnel	Containment
August 22	10,523 acres (4,259 ha)	—	
August 23	15,039 acres (6,086 ha)	400	
August 24	15,051 acres (6,091 ha)	720	
August 25	15,066 acres (6,097 ha)	816	
August 26	15,085 acres (6,105 ha)	586	
August 27	15,085 acres (6,105 ha)	570	
August 28	15,085 acres (6,105 ha)	550	
August 29	15,085 acres (6,105 ha)	249	
—
September 9	15,067 acres (6,097 ha)	—	

== See also ==
- 2026 Nevada wildfires
- 2026 United States wildfires
- Bug Fire
- Poeville Fire
