= Bug Fire =

2026 wildfire in Nevada and California

- Part of the 2026 California and Nevada wildfire seasons
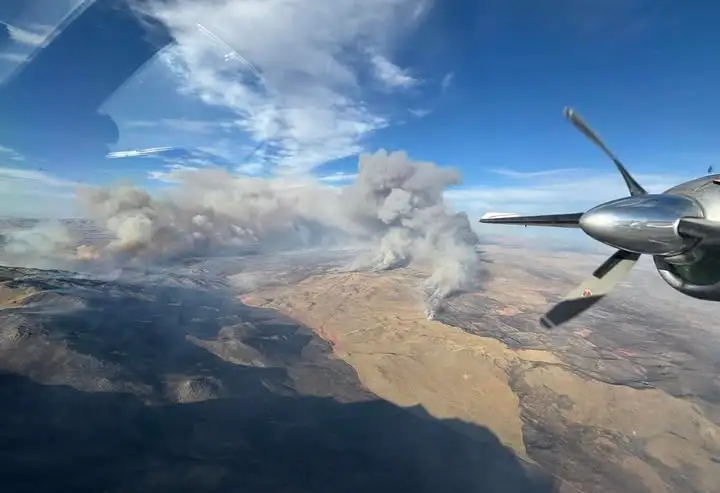
- Aerial view of the Bug Fire on August 10
- Date: August 8 – August 27
- Location: Washoe County, Nevada and Lassen and Sierra County, California
- Coordinates: 39.7229°N 120.0366°W

Statistics
- Perimeter: 100% contained
- Burned area: 93,733 acres (37,932 ha)

Impacts
- Deaths: 1 civilian
- Injuries: 2 civilians 1 firefighter
- Evacuated: 5,000 – >6,000 (Note: Estimates vary by source and evacuations overlap with the Stallion Fire.)
- Structures destroyed: 9 residential

Ignition
- Cause: Human (Note: Specifics under investigation.)

Map
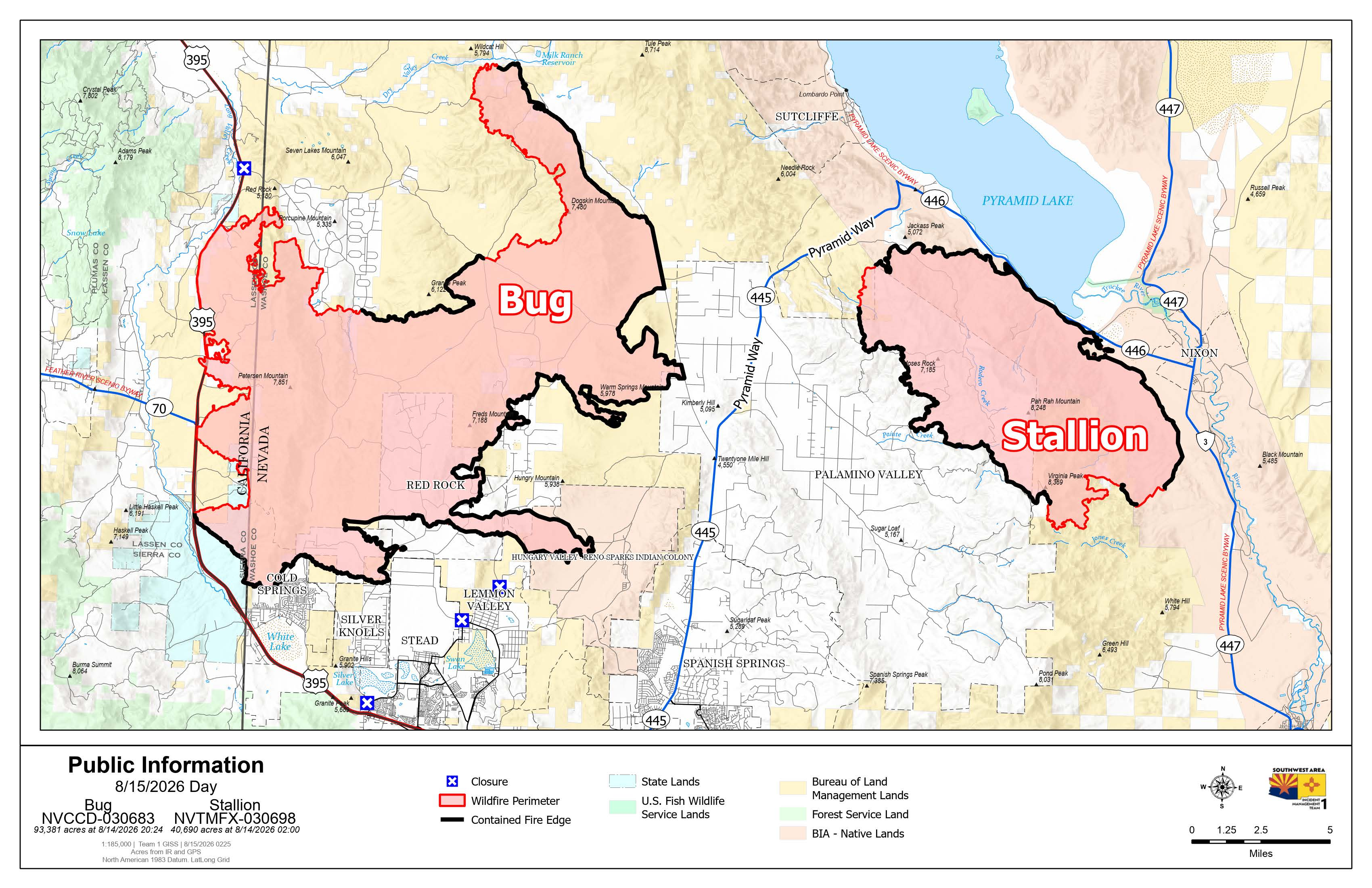
- Map of the Bug Fire and Stallion fires on August 15

The Bug Fire was a large wildfire that burned in Washoe County, Nevada and Lassen and Sierra Counties, California. The fire ignited on August 8, 2026 from human origin in Lassen County near the California Agricultural Inspection Station Long Valley of U.S. Route 395 and, driven by strong winds and dry vegetation, spread into Sierra County and crossed the state line into Nevada. The fire caused power outages, prompted evacuations, destroyed nine structures, and caused three injuries and one fatality. The Bug Fire reached 100% containment on August 27.

== Background ==
The Washoe Zephyr is a routine, local wind that occurs in the Truckee Meadows. In evening, warm air rises from the ground, traveling west as it cools and sinks near the Sierra Nevada. This subsequently lowers atmospheric pressure in the Truckee Meadows. This sinking motion creates high atmospheric pressure near the Sierra Nevada, and the movement of air from high pressure to low pressure creates wind.

August 8, 2026 tied that day's record high temperature with August 8, 1972, at 103 °F (39 °C) in Reno, Nevada; the high temperature was 13.2°F above normal. That day's minimum temperature was also a record high at 77 °F (25 °C), breaking the record of August 8, 2001.

On August 8 and 9, atmospheric instability caused by excessive heat allowed a smoke plume to rise; the smoke was warmer than the higher altitude air. Excessive temperatures just under 100 °F (38 °C), combined with strong westerly Washoe Zephyr winds blowing 15–20 miles per hour (24–32 km/h) and gusting up to 35 miles per hour (56 km/h), contributed to the Bug Fire's spread. Energy release components were above the 97th percentile on August 11, which indicate critically dry vegetation. Low overall humidity and minimal overnight humidity recovery have also contributed to the fire conditions. The Bug Fire burned in sagebrush, grasses, and pockets of pinyon–juniper.

A lack of available firefighting in resources in Nevada initially slowed containment. Multiple wildfires in the area stretched resources thin. Officials stated on August 12, "we have about 100 firefighters per 30,000 acres of [the Bug and Stallion] fires."

== Cause ==
Resources began responding to the Bug Fire at 3:30 pm, near the California Agricultural Inspection Station in Long Valley, reported at 10–20 acres (4.0–8.1 ha) and spreading east. Officials have confirmed the blaze is human–caused, however, investigations into the exact cause are still underway.

The Fred Mountain Fire that merged with the Bug Fire on August 11 was allegedly ignited by arson. A 47–year–old woman confessed to starting several fires in the region, including the Fred Mountain Fire, and was arrested on August 11 on charges of third-degree arson and possession of a controlled substance.

== Progression ==
An evacuation warning was soon issued in southern Lassen County to the Nevada state line; it was upgraded to an evacuation order roughly 20 minutes later. An evacuation warning was issued in Sierra County from the Sierra–Lassen county line to where U.S. Route 395 enters California from Nevada. Evacuations were soon ordered in and north of Cold Springs, Nevada. The fire grew to 800 acres (320 ha) that evening, later mapped at 2,467 acres (998 ha). Further evacuations were issued in the Silver Knolls neighborhood. The evacuation center was moved from North Valleys Library to Evelyn Mount Community Center in Reno. California Highway Patrol partially reopened U.S. Route 395 near the California–Nevada state line to one–way traffic. The Bug Fire was 4,182 acres (1,692 ha). As the fire grew to 6,528 acres (2,642 ha) by 11 pm, Nevada Highway Patrol closed the White Lake Parkway and Village Parkway exits off U.S. Route 395.

Evacuations grew throughout the night, particularly around Cold Springs and Stead. Evacuation warnings were slightly expanded in Washoe County and entirely lifted in California, and containment reached 20%. Nevada National Guard activated aerial firefighting resources. Despite this, fire activity abruptly increased, spreading to 11,405 acres (4,615 ha) and containment fell to 3% that evening, driven by westerly winds. The Bug Fire grew to 15,000 acres (6,100 ha) that night after several long runs ranging from three–six miles (4.8–9.7 km).

Overnight, the fire pushed south towards the Hungry Valley community of the Reno-Sparks Indian Colony. Washoe County School District closed eight schools on August 10: Spanish Springs, Desert Heights, Silver Lake, Lemmon Valley, Alice Taylor, and Jesse Hall elementary schools, Shaw Middle School, and Spanish Springs High School. The Federal Emergency Management Agency (FEMA) authorized emergency funds after the State of Nevada's request for financial aid for suppression. Additional evacuation warnings and orders were issued in northern Red Rock throughout the day. Acreage and containment increased to 17,000 acres (6,900 ha) and 4%, respectively. Governor Joe Lombardo issued a state of emergency that noted Washoe County's emergency declaration and the Reno–Sparks Indian Colony declaring a tribal emergency. Evacuation warnings largely expanded that evening.

The Washoe County School District closed the eight schools again for August 11, along with Natchez Elementary School. That morning, the Fred Mountain Fire merged with the Bug Fire; the blaze was now 44,304 acres (17,929 ha). Evacuation warnings and orders were issued in Spanish Springs. Evacuation notices expanded throughout the day. The Bug Fire spread to 61,803 acres (25,011 ha).

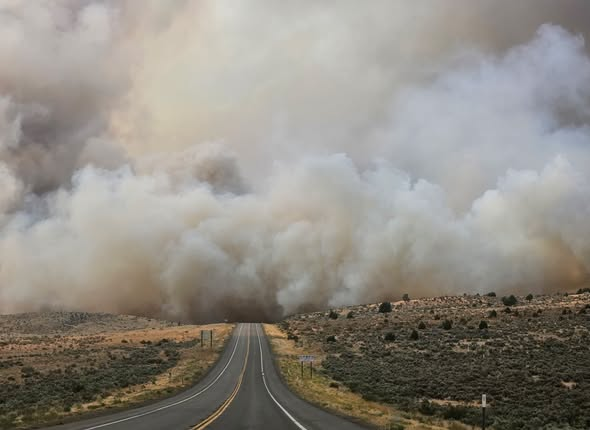
The Bug Fire on August 12, just around the time it jumped U.S. 395

Overnight, the Bug Fire grew to 66,506 acres (26,914 ha). Aerial firefighting operations decreased fire activity on the northern end of the fire near the community of Rancho Haven. Firing operations were also conducted on the northern end of the fire, while on the southern end, mop–up began. Between 5 and 6 pm, evacuation orders and warnings were issued in Lassen and Plumas counties. Further evacuations were issued north of the fire in Nevada. The Nevada Highway Patrol closed U.S. Route 395 between the Nevada–California state line and Red Rock Road. Aerial operations were limited on August 14 due to strong wind shear. Pilot operations were complicated by terrain, which endangers pilot safety because they were required to complete operations to happen at once because of the swift change in altitude. Two separate lightning–caused fires within the perimeter were immediately extinguished. While evacuation orders were downgraded to evacuation warnings in Silver Knolls, Nevada, California Highway Patrol closed U.S. Route 395 from the state line to North Constantia Road in Doyle and part of State Route 70 east of Portola. Strong outflow winds from thunderstorms drove the fire west, but that portion of the fire did not receive precipitation.

The Bug Fire grew to 88,422 acres (35,783 ha) overnight and containment increased to 15%. Evacuation orders and warnings were lifted in Plumas and Lassen counties. U.S. Route 395 fully reopened at 10:45 am. Crews made progress containing the fire's southern edge as containment increased to 31% later that day. Evacuations were lifted and roads reopened in Lemmon Valley and Hungry Valley. Precipitation fell on the fire that evening, moderating fire activity, and several evacuation orders were reduced to evacuation warnings.

On August 14, containment increased to 44%, with the southern end near Cold Springs fully contained and largely contained in the northern front near Petersen Mountain. NV Energy reactivated power to all customers and repair work began on damaged infrastructure. Several more evacuation orders and warnings were lifted, primarily south of the fire; the number of evacuated residents decreased to 282. Containment increased to 58%. NV Energy restored power to all customers on August 15. Primarily due to precipitation and aggressive firefighting techniques, containment increased to 84% that night and several more evacuations were lifted.

The fire line along U.S. Route 395 was fully contained by August 16. An unauthorized aerial drone operation temporarily suspended aerial firefighting operations. All evacuations and road closures were lifted. One fire crew continued patrol and suppression efforts overnight, and the next day the suspect for igniting the Fred Mountain Fire appeared in court.

Resources were diverted to suppress the nearby Hawk Fire on August 22. Crews achieved full containment on August 27.

== Effects ==
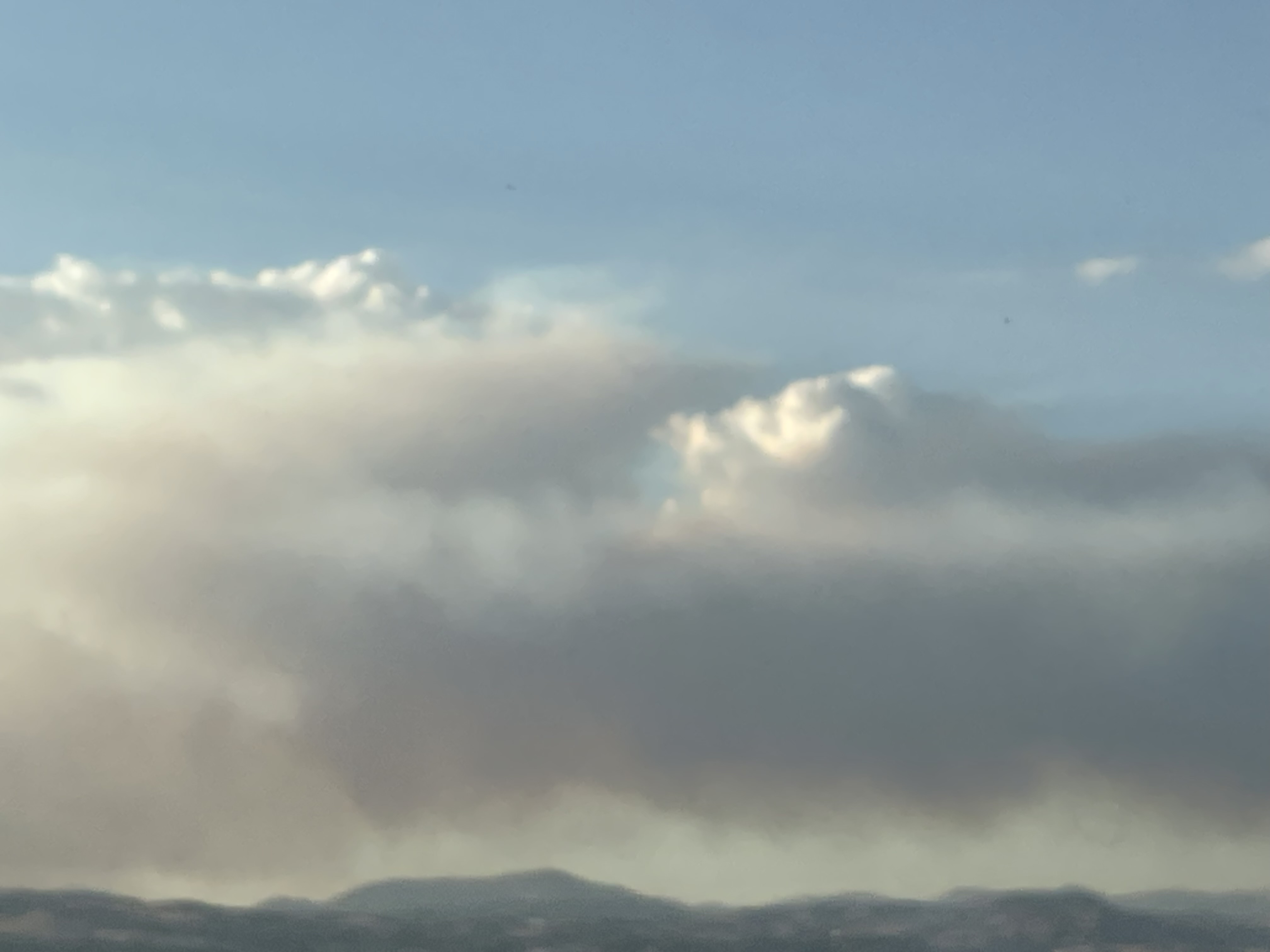
Smoke clouds from the Bug Fire over the Truckee Meadows on August 8

The Bug Fire has destroyed at least nine structures. At its peak, the Bug Fire threatened 6,000 residential structures. Between 5,000 and over 6,000 residents have been evacuated. The Community Foundation of Northern Nevada launched a financial grant program to impacted residents. There is increased law enforcement presence in repopulated areas. Originally, one firefighter and one civilian were injured. They have been released from medical care. On August 13, two civilians received burns once winds changed and were left with minimal time to evacuate. They were initially treated by on–scene firefighters and paramedics were airlifted to University of California, Davis Firefighters Burn Institute Regional Burn Center. One of the injured, an elderly woman who had Parkinson's disease, succumbed to severe burns and smoke inhalation on August 15. Her husband remains in critical condition. One black bear died from stress after evacuating from Animal Ark.

Power outages have impacted up to 6,400 NV Energy customers. The Washoe County School District closed eight schools on August 10 and nine schools from August 11 to August 14. The Bureau of Land Management (BLM) has temporarily closed the 19,050 acres (7,710 ha) North Reno Recreation Area. Frenchman Lake in Plumas County is closed for aerial firefighting operations.

Air quality impacts were seen in surrounding communities. Flash flood and mudslide warnings were issued in the Bug Fire's burn scar during precipitation.

== Growth and containment table ==
Fire containment status Gray: contained; Red: active; %: percent contained;
Date	Area burned	Containment
August 8	6,528 acres (2,642 ha)	
August 9	15,000 acres (6,100 ha)	
August 10	16,680 acres (6,750 ha)	
August 11	57,966 acres (23,458 ha)	
August 12	70,757 acres (28,634 ha)	
August 13	88,422 acres (35,783 ha)	
August 14	93,967 acres (38,027 ha)	
August 15	94,105 acres (38,083 ha)	
August 16	94,105 acres (38,083 ha)	
August 17	94,105 acres (38,083 ha)	
August 18	97,733 acres (39,551 ha)	
August 19	97,733 acres (39,551 ha)	
August 20	97,733 acres (39,551 ha)	
August 21	97,733 acres (39,551 ha)	
August 22	97,733 acres (39,551 ha)	
August 23	97,733 acres (39,551 ha)	
