= 2026 Nevada wildfires =

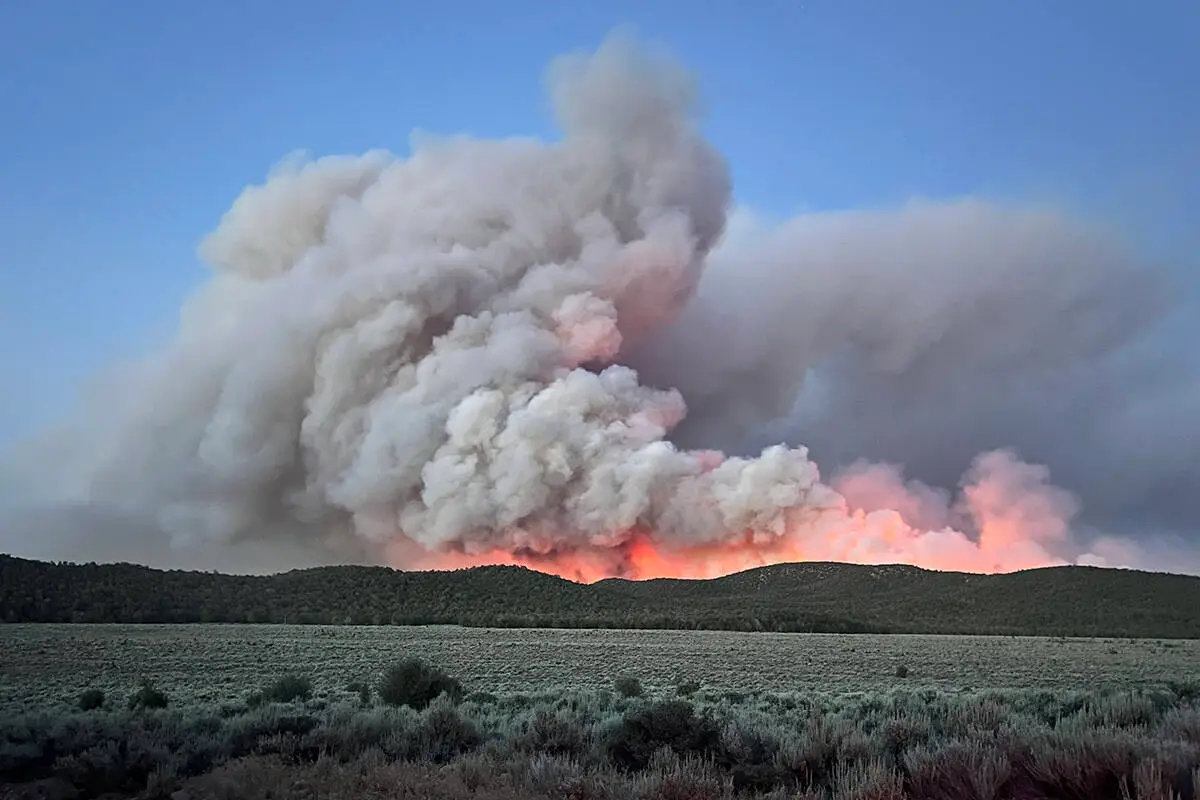
- The Grapevine Fire on June 17

Impacts
- Deaths: 2
- Injuries: 9

A series of wildfires have been burning throughout the U.S. state of Nevada. There have been two fatalities and nine injuries.

== Background ==
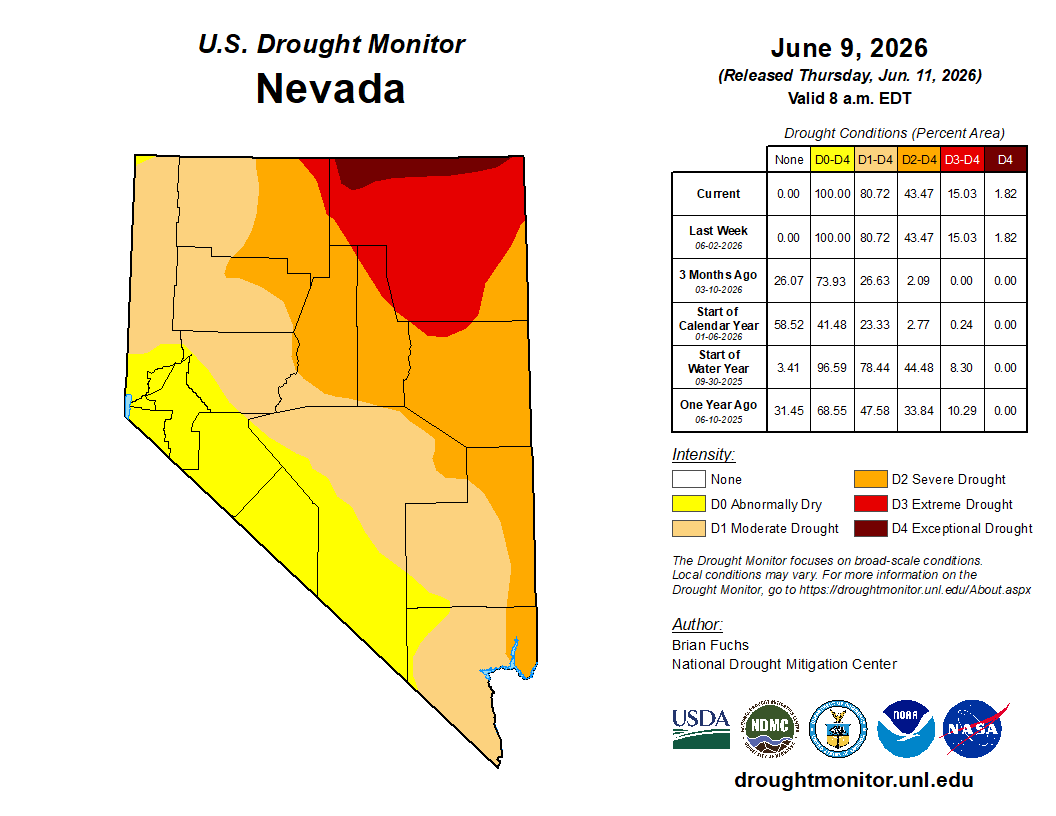
Drought monitor of Nevada on June 9, 2026

The typical fire season in Nevada lasts from May to October, the time when vegetation is the driest. However, the timing varies every year based on a number of other factors, including if there is hot, dry weather, the amount of dry vegetation, and when there are more natural causes possible, such as lightning. The peak time of the season is also determined by these factors. Historically, wildfire severity has increased due to large amounts of dry fuel, and acreage typically increases in drought-like and heavy precipitation years.

== Summary ==
=== Preseason conditions and outlook ===
Nevada experienced record low snowpack levels after the 2025–26 winter, with many measuring cites in Northern and Eastern Nevada recording all snow melted between one and two months before normal. Significant snowpack was only noted in areas above 8,000 feet (2,400 m) in elevation in early June. The snowmelt in lower elevations exposed vegetation fuel. Significant drought throughout the state has dried those fuels out, with all areas of the state reported to be at least "abnormally dry" in early June. Humidity levels have been dropping into the single digits, further drying vegetation. Above-average temperatures have been reported in Western Nevada, with low temperatures 60–70 °F (16–21 °C) and high temperatures potentially reaching triple digits, as forecasts predicted extreme temperatures to last through August. The National Interagency Fire Center (NIFC) has reported wildfire risk for Southern Nevada in June and wildfire potential across Northern Nevada in July and August.

=== Events ===
Dry thunderstorms occurred in Lincoln County in mid–June, igniting the Grapevine and Kane Springs fires south of Caliente. The Grapevine Fire prompted level one "ready" evacuations in Washington County, Utah. The fires spread rapidly due to strong winds and low relative humidity. Lightning sparked the Dry Canyon and Parsnip Peak fires in Lincoln County on July 9, driven by low humidity, strong winds, and extremely dry vegetation. Five large wildfires ignited across Northern and Southern Nevada in late July: the Mouse Meadows and Quail Springs fires in Nevada Test and Training Range, the New Pass Fire northwest of Austin, the Chimney Fire in western Elko County, and the Secret Pass Fire in Ruby Mountain State Recreation Area.

The Bug Fire north of downtown Reno on August 10

On August 8, the Bug Fire ignited in Lassen County, California, rapidly spreading into Sierra and Washoe counties, prompting evacuations. The Fred Mountain Fire ignited a day later. It also caused evacuations and power outages that overlapped with the Bug Fire. The Stallion Fire, which started on August 10 and south of Pyramid Lake, closed the lake and prompted evacuation orders and warnings in and west of Nixon. On August 10, Governor Joe Lombardo declared a state of emergency for the Bug and Fred Mountain fires; the Fred Mountain Fire merged with the Bug Fire on August 11. A woman was arrested for third–degree arson and possession of a controlled substance after admitting to authorities she started the Fred Mountain Fire. While evacuating from the Bug Fire on August 12, an elderly couple was injured. The wife with Parkinson's disease died on August 15 from severe burns and smoke inhalation. Overall, the two wildfires have forced evacuations for 5,000 to over 6,000 residents and 300 large animals, caused power outages for up to 6,400 customers, and destroyed nine residential structures.

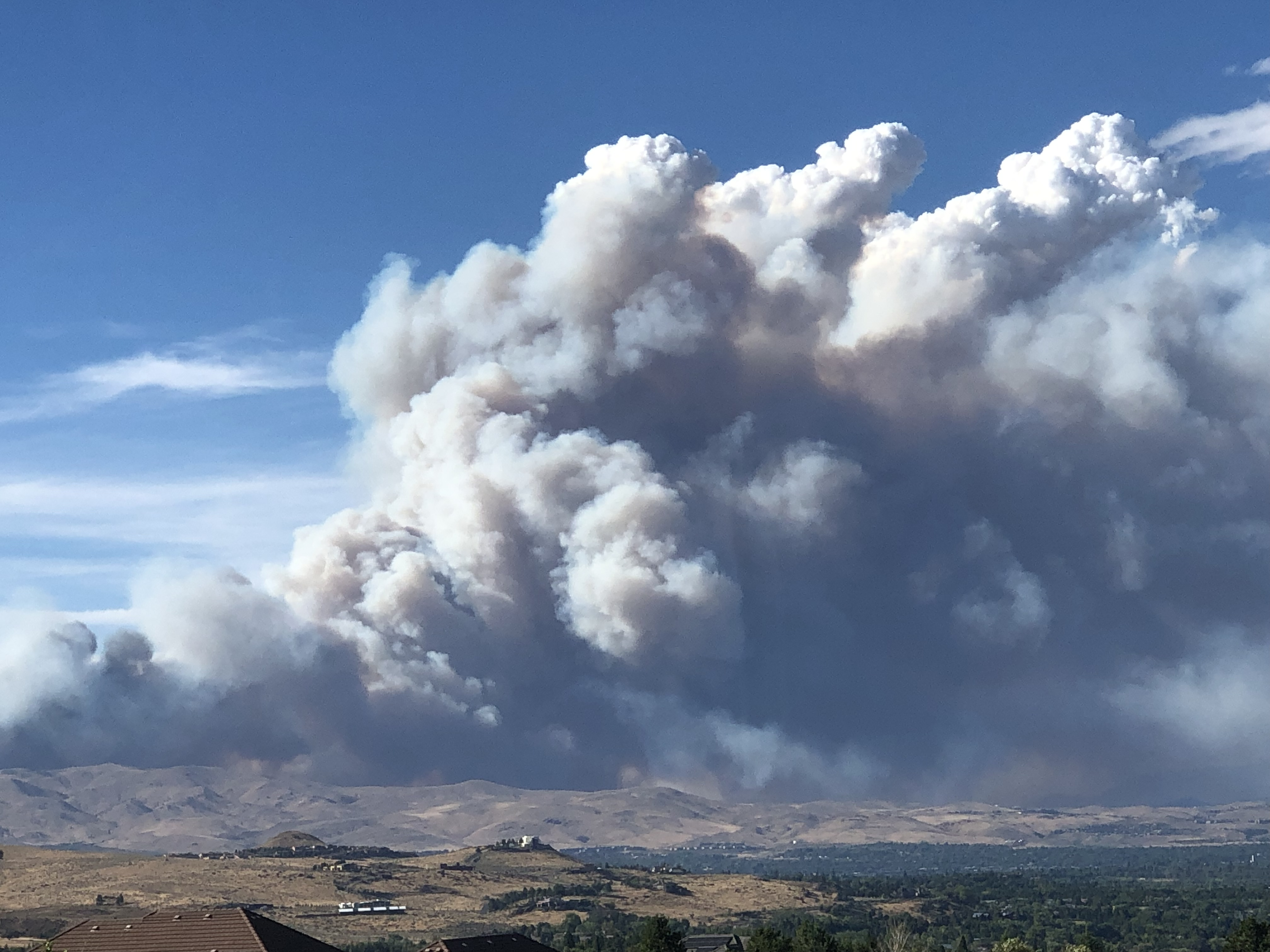
The Hawk Fire seen from south Reno on August 22

On August 22, the Hawk Fire started in Humboldt–Toiyabe National Forest near Peavine Peak from human origin. U.S. Route 395 was closed and approximately 59,000 NV Energy customers lost power on August 22. Reno Stead Airport temporarily closed to all operations aside from firefighting aircraft. Three civilians and three firefighters were injured, and an 83–year–old woman died from burns and smoke inhalation. Up to 42,000 residents were under evacuation orders and another 45,000 were in evacuation warning zones. The Hawk Fire destroyed 48 structures and damaged eight, making it the most destructive wildfire in Nevada history.

Smoke clouds from the Floriston Fire on September 16, seen from Reno

The Floriston Fire that burned near Floriston, California, started on September 16. The Truckee Meadows Fire Protection District assumed control of the fire in conjunction with the California Department of Forestry and Fire Protection (CAL FIRE), California Highway Patrol (CHP), and the United States Forest Service. While the fire burned entirely in Nevada County, California and prompted evacuation orders only in California, evacuation warnings were issued near Verdi and westbound Interstate 80 was closed due to rockfalls. The fire burned 635.9 acres (257.3 ha) and was fully contained on September 24. J Resort, Silver Legacy Resort and Casino, Eldorado Resort Casino, Circus Circus Reno, and the Grand Sierra Resort offered discounted room rates to evacuees. The Northern Nevada Public Health Air Quality Management Division issued an air quality alert in and around Verdi as air quality reached unhealthy for sensitive groups with an air quality index measure of 109.

After a mountain lion was spotted in Rancho San Rafael Regional Park, the Nevada Department of Wildlife (NDOW) said wildfires in mountainous regions may have caused wildlife to migrate to lower elevations.

== List of wildfires ==
The following is a list of fires that burned more than 1,000 acres (400 ha), produced significant structural damage, or resulted in casualties.

Name	County	Acres	Start date	Containment date (Note: Containment means that fire crews have established and secured control lines around the fire's perimeter. These lines are artificial barriers, like trenches or cleared vegetation, designed to stop the fire's spread, or natural barriers like rivers. Containment reflects progress in managing the fire but does not necessarily mean the fire is starved of fuel, under control, or put out.)	Notes	Image	Ref.
Quartz	Pershing	2,448	May 23	May 27	Unknown cause. Burned in Dun Glen Canyon in Imlay. Threatened structures.		
Egberts	Elko	654	May 25	June 1	Caused by an agricultural burn that escaped containment lines. Burned near Clover Valley 10 miles (16 km) southwest of Wells. 14 firefighters were treated at a local hospital after contracting an allergic reaction of an unknown source.		
Navato	Washoe	100	June 16	June 17	Cause under investigation. Burned in Sparks. Prompted evacuations and caused power outages for nearly 70,000 customers.		
Grapevine	Lincoln	26,464	June 17	July 17	Lightning-caused. Burned in Clover Mountain Wilderness Area and showed extreme fire behavior. Prompting level one evacuations in Washington County, Utah and closed Beaver Dam State Park.		
Kane Springs	Lincoln	17,042	June 17	July 13	Lightning-caused. Burning 17 miles (27 km) southwest of Caliente and spread to the northeast.		
Shyster	Humboldt	2,186	June 20	June 22	Lightning-caused. Burning off State Route 140 south of Denio and forward progress stopped. Threatened energy infrastructure.		
Dry Canyon	Lincoln	1,698	June 26	July 13	Lightning-caused. Burned 2.5 miles (4.0 km) east of Ursine.		
Parsnip Peak	Lincoln	2,264	June 26	July 17	Lightning-caused. Burned in Parsnip Peak Wilderness.		
Dutch Flat	Humboldt	15,558	July 5	July 8	Burned 9 miles (14 km) northeast of Winnemucca.		
18 Mile	Elko	1,326	July 12	July 17	Lightning-caused. Burned 21 miles (34 km) north of Montello.		
Little Cottonwood	Eureka	1,088	July 21	July 22	Burned in Crescent Valley.		
Mouse Meadow	Nye	51,408	July 23	September 4	Lightning-caused. Burned in Nevada Test and Training Range 35 miles (56 km) southwest of Rachel.		
Quail Springs	Lincoln	13,611	July 25	September 4	Lightning-caused. Burned in Nevada Test and Training Range, 25 miles (40 km) southwest of Crystal Springs.		
Secret Pass	Elko	3,300	July 25	August 5	Lightning-caused. Burned northeast of State Route 229.		
Chimney	Elko	20,985	July 26	July 31	Burned 15 miles (24 km) north of Midas near Little Humboldt Wilderness Study Area.		
New Pass	Churchill, Lander	37,899	July 26	August 13	Lightning-caused. Burned 30 miles (48 km) northwest of Austin. Forward progress stopped on August 9. (Note: Forward progress is the stop of a wildfire's spread in one or more directions.)		
Ward	White Pine	8,683	July 31	August 25	Lightning-caused. Burned on Ward Mountain in Humboldt–Toiyabe National Forest.		
Antelope Creek	Elko	6,282	August 2	August 5	Burned 20 miles (32 km) southeast of Midas.		
Bug	Washoe, Lassen (CA), Sierra (CA)	93,733	August 8	August 27	Cause under investigation. Ignited in and spread over from California and burned in Cold Springs. Prompted evacuations for over 3,800 residences. Merged with the Fred Mountain Fire on August 11, which prompted evacuations and caused power outages. Destroyed nine structures and caused one fatality and three injuries.		
Stallion	Washoe	40,691	August 10	August 27	Burned south of Pyramid Lake. Closed the lake and State Route 446. Prompted evacuations.		
Shoshone	Churchill	24,514	August 15	August 24	Lightning-caused. Burned 58 miles (93 km) northeast of Fallon in the Clan Alpine Mountains.		
Hawk	Washoe	15,085	August 22	September 9	Human-caused, specifics under investigation. Prompted evacuation orders for 42,000 residents in Reno near Peavine Peak. Caused power outages for approximately 59,000 customers. Most destructive wildfire in Nevada history; destroyed 48 structures and caused six injuries and one fatality.		
Sombrero	Humboldt	19,204	August 24	August 27	Lightning-caused. Burned northwest of Winnemucca.		
Oxley	Elko	11,384	August 24	August 31	Lightning-caused. Threatened approximately 15 structures north of Wells.		
S–1 Vya	Washoe	9,692	August 24	September 7	Cause under investigation. Burned northwest of Vya and prompting evacuations.		
McConnell	Humboldt	33,816	August 25	October 12	Lightning-caused. Burned east of Orovada and prompted evacuation warnings.		
Blue Eagle	Churchill	9,218	August 25	September 6	Lightning-caused. Burned near the Clan Alpine Mountains.		
Calico	Humboldt	18,319	August 26	September 10	Burned north of Forks Ranch.		
Bull	Washoe	1,529	October 2	October 15	Cause currently unknown. Burned north of Verdi into the Hawk Fire burn scar, prompted evacuation warnings in Verdi, Mogul, and the Somersett neighborhood. Closed Verdi Elementary School.		
Jones	Elko	1,657	October 5	October 8	Burned in Deeth, prompted evacuation warnings.		

== See also ==
- 2026 Arizona wildfires
- 2026 California wildfires
- 2026 Idaho wildfires
- 2026 Oregon wildfires
- 2026 United States wildfires
- 2026 Utah wildfires
- Wildfires in 2026
