= Lemmon Valley–Golden Valley, Nevada =

Lemmon Valley-Golden Valley, Nevada
- Former CDP
- Location of Lemmon Valley-Golden Valley, Nevada
- Coordinates: 39°39′50″N 119°49′37″W
- Country: United States
- State: Nevada

Area
  - Total: 32.5 sq mi (84.1 km^{2})
  - Land: 32.5 sq mi (84.1 km^{2})
  - Water: 0 sq mi (0.0 km^{2})

Population (2000)
  - Total: 6,855
  - Density: 211/sq mi (81.5/km^{2})
- Time zone: UTC-8 (Pacific (PST))
  - Summer (DST): UTC-7 (PDT)
- FIPS code: 32-41825

Lemmon Valley–Golden Valley is a former census-designated place (CDP) in Washoe County, Nevada, United States. For the 2010 census it was replaced by two separate CDPs, Lemmon Valley and Golden Valley. The population of the combined CDP was 6,855 at the 2000 census. The area is a northern suburb of the city of Reno and is part of the Reno–Sparks Metropolitan Statistical Area.

== Geography ==
The Lemmon Valley–Golden Valley CDP was located at 39°39′50″N 119°49′37″W (39.663842, -119.826961).

According to the United States Census Bureau, the CDP had a total area of 32.5 square miles (84 km^{2}), all land.

It contains the Swan Lake Nature Study Area, a small wetland conservation area home to many bird species.

== Demographics ==
As of the census of 2000, there were 6,855 people, 2,418 households, and 1,886 families residing in the CDP. The population density was 211.2 inhabitants per square mile (81.5/km^{2}). There were 2,507 housing units at an average density of 77.2 per square mile (29.8/km^{2}). The racial makeup of the CDP was 90.42% White, 0.35% African American, 2.38% Native American, 1.18% Asian, 0.18% Pacific Islander, 2.38% from other races, and 3.12% from two or more races. Hispanic or Latino of any race were 5.92% of the population.

There were 2,418 households, out of which 34.7% had children under the age of 18 living with them, 61.2% were married couples living together, 10.8% had a female householder with no husband present, and 22.0% were non-families. 15.1% of all households were made up of individuals, and 3.2% had someone living alone who was 65 years of age or older. The average household size was 2.83 and the average family size was 3.11.

In the CDP, the population was spread out, with 26.2% under the age of 18, 7.1% from 18 to 24, 29.5% from 25 to 44, 29.4% from 45 to 64, and 7.8% who were 65 years of age or older. The median age was 39 years. For every 100 females there were 105.9 males. For every 100 females age 18 and over, there were 102.0 males.

The median income for a household in the CDP was $52,861, and the median income for a family was $56,118. Males had a median income of $39,069 versus $29,888 for females. The per capita income for the CDP was $21,820. About 3.6% of families and 5.0% of the population were below the poverty line, including 4.7% of those under age 18 and 4.4% of those age 65 or over.
