= Idlewild Park (Reno, Nevada) =

Community park in Nevada

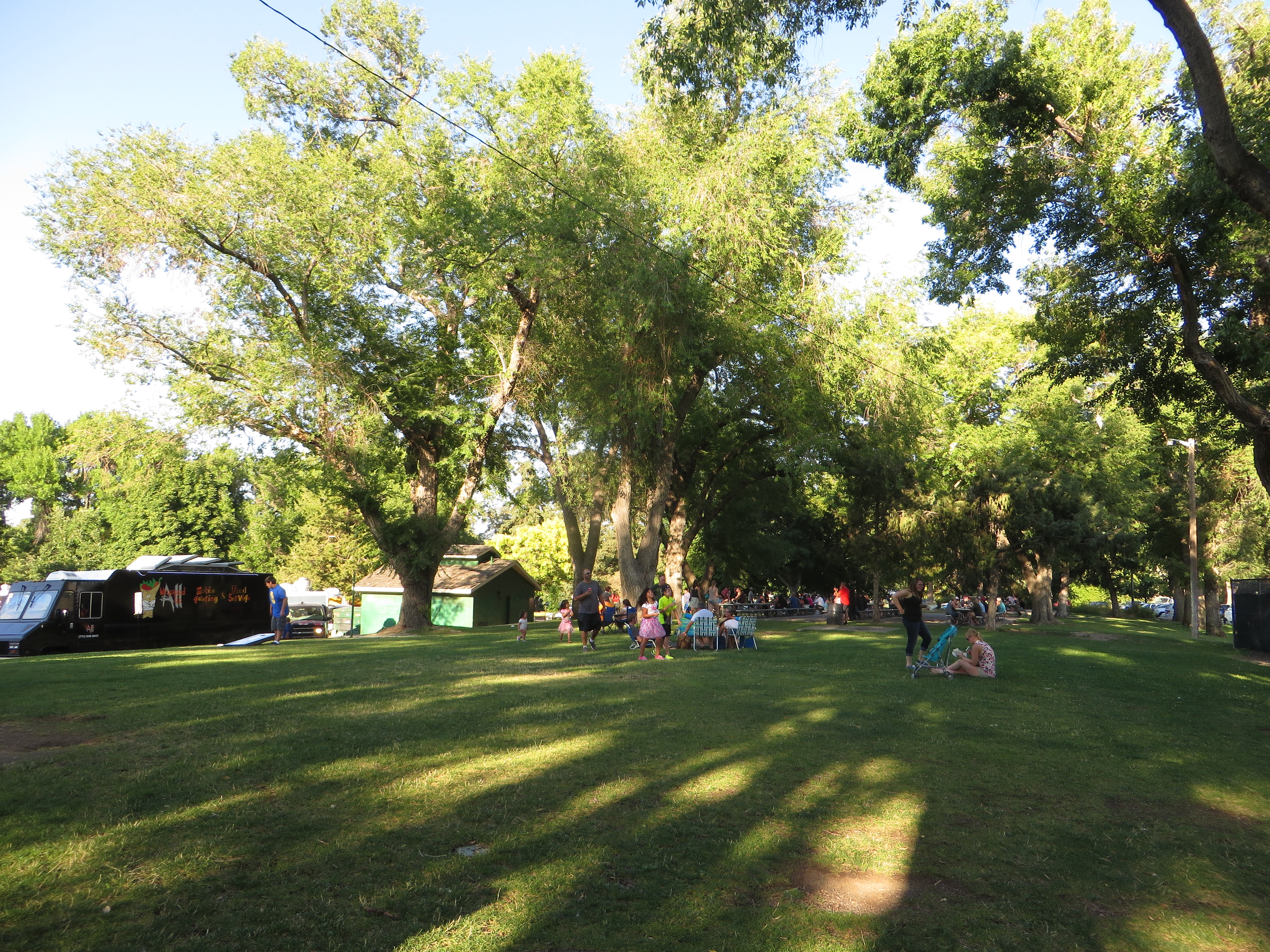

- Location within Nevada Location within the United States
- Location: Reno, Nevada, United States of America
- Coordinates: 39.521944°N 119.833056°W
- Area: 49 acres (20 ha)
- Created: 1927
- Operator: City of Reno
- Status: Open year round
- Website: Official site

Idlewild Park is a large, 49 acre community park close to downtown Reno, Nevada on the Truckee River. It includes a rose garden, duck ponds, two children's parks, a pool and a skate park. It holds the Reno Earth Day celebration every year and hosts the Reno Street Food food truck event through the summer months. It is also home to the historic California Building on Cowan Drive.

Idlewild park is a 49-acre park that was once just a few ranches owned by Bennett, Murray, and Ferris. In 1907, the property that is now Idlewild park was purchased by James Newlands (nephew of former US Senator Francis Newlands). In 1921, the City of Reno purchased this property from Newlands for $23,500.

== California Building ==
In 1927, Reno hosted an exposition commemorating the completion of the Transcontinental Highway passing through the City and a building was erected on the site. In 1938, the American Legion gave the building to the City of Reno. We call this the California Building which hosts numerous cultural and special event, weddings, meetings and group gatherings throughout the year.

== Rose Garden ==
The Rose Garden was established in 1958 under the leadership of Fred Galloway and is now dedicated in his honor. Galloway was the City of Reno horticulturist for more than 25 years, retiring in 1983. It is the only Rose Garden located in the State of Nevada that is certified by the American Rose Society. The Rose Garden is one acre of Idlewild Park and hosts over 200 varieties of roses and over 1,750 total roses.

== History ==
Idlewild Park and the California Building were gifts to Reno from the State of California. It was the dawn of the age of automobile travel and Reno was suddenly an important crossroads for two new transcontinental highways. Both the Lincoln Highway (today's U.S. 50) and the Victory Highway (old U.S. 40 through Reno, now 4th Street) were being completed and a big celebration was in order, which turned out to be the 1927 Transcontinental Highway Exposition. The original Reno Arch built for the Exposition was moved to Idlewild Park before it ended up at its present location spanning Lake Street next to the National Automobile Museum.
