= Poeville, Nevada =

Poeville
- Unincorporated area
- Nicknames: Poe City, Podunk
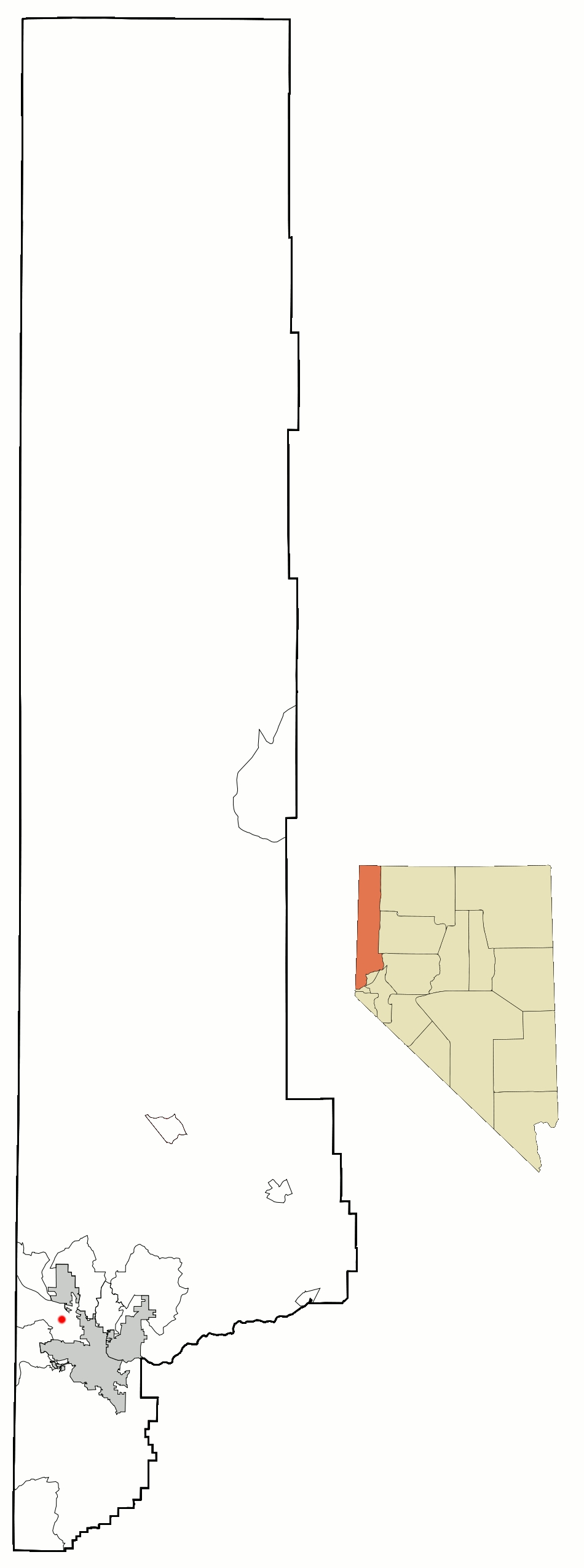
- Location of Poeville, Nevada
- Coordinates: 39°35′06″N 119°54′14″W
- Country: United States
- State: Nevada
- County: Washoe
- Elevation: 6,391 ft (1,948 m)

Population (2010)
  - Total: 0
- Time zone: UTC-8 (Pacific (PST))
  - Summer (DST): UTC-7 (PDT)
- ZIP codes: 89506
- Area code: 775

Poeville, also known as Peavine until 1863, is the site of a historical mining town, established in 1864. John Poe, a professional promoter from Michigan allegedly related to Edgar Allan Poe, discovered rich gold and silver veins in 1862 on the slopes of Peavine Mountain. After the discovery of ore, Poe announced that the veins comprised the next Comstock Lode; he presented extracted ore at the state fair of 1864 as rich in content. As a result, the former mining camp, called Poe City (Poeville) or Podunk (Poedunk), grew to 200 people by 1864. Ore production in the mining district and population peaked around 1873-1874 with several hundred people living in town, supported by three hotels and a post office. The post office, named "Poeville", operated between September 1, 1874, and March 24, 1878. As of 2010 the population of the community is 0.

The smelting of the sulfide-rich ores with the primitive technology of the time directly at town was difficult, and also water resources were scarce. The situation improved in 1866, when the extracted ore was freighted to smelters by wagon to Cisco, California, and, after the completion of the Central Pacific Railroad, by rail to Sacramento, California. Income from the mines was low, for the extracted ore was rich not in gold, but in copper. Mining activity rapidly slowed, then ceased altogether in the late 1870s. By 1880, only 15 people remained in town. Nothing can be seen today of the former town. Several small mining claims were in operation near the town site since that time.

== Geography ==
Poeville, according to the Nevada Bureau of Mines and Geology, was situated on the flat area to the right on Peavine Road, where the road turns up a switchback to the left (latitude: 39.591221, longitude: -119.906137).

== Golden Fleece Mine ==
The Golden Fleece Mine was operated by the Golden Fleece Gold & Silver Mining Company, incorporated on February 2, 1875, which held one patented claim on the site. W. F. Stewart had published a geological report on the mine in 1879, which had an eight-foot vein of ore.

== See also ==
- Gold mining in Nevada
- Silver mining in Nevada
- Gold mining in the United States
- List of ghost towns in Nevada
