= Swan Lake Nature Study Area =

Conservation area in Nevada, United States

Swan Lake
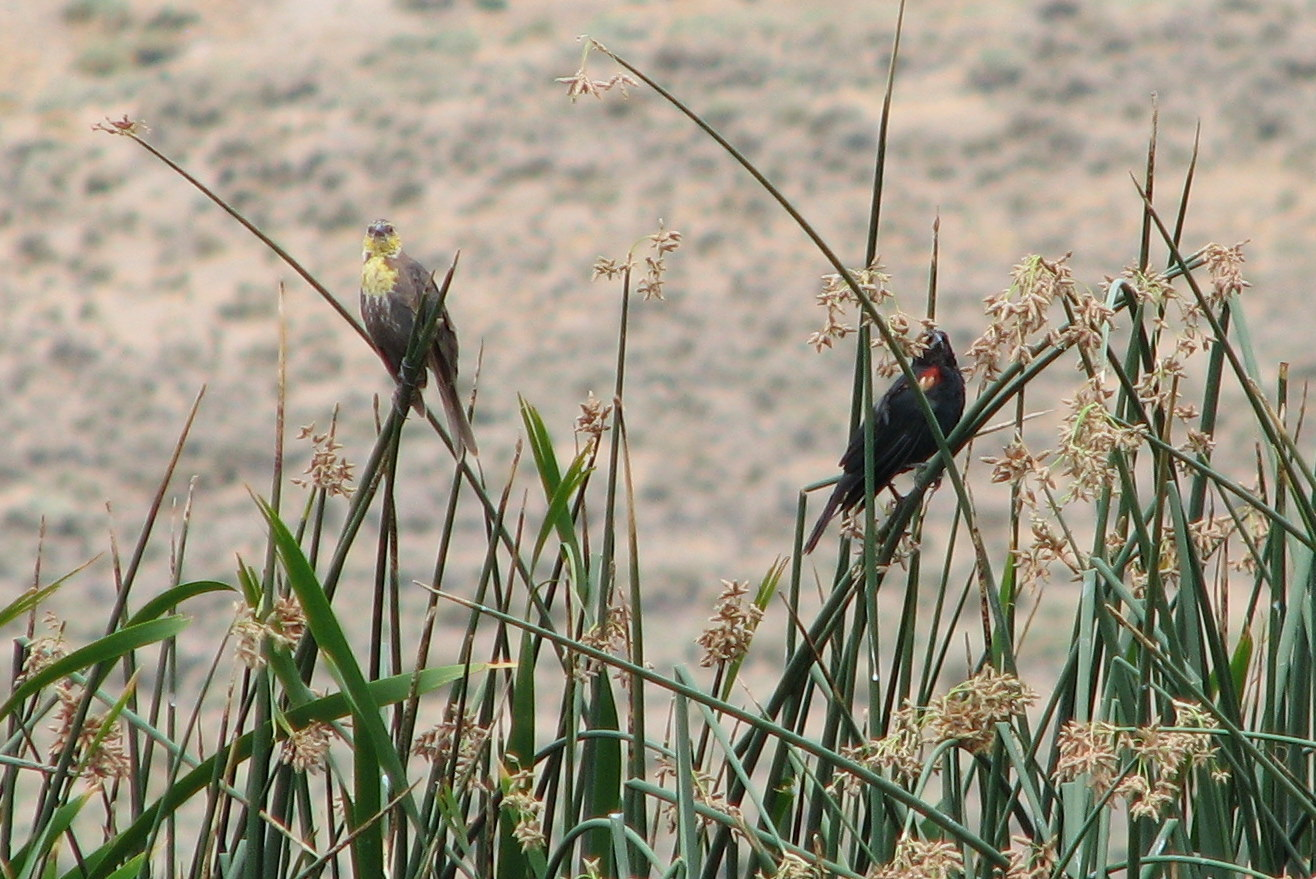
- A molting male yellow-headed blackbird and a male red-winged blackbird perch among the reeds. Birding is a main attraction of the Swan Lake Nature Study Area.

- Location within Nevada
- Location: Washoe County, Nevada
- Coordinates: 39.659517°N 119.844439°W
- Type: Endorheic
- Primary inflows: Cottonwood Creek, sewage treatment, and washes
- Primary outflows: Evaporation
- Basin countries: United States
- Max. depth: 6 ft (1.8 m)
- Surface elevation: 4,915 ft (1,498 m)

The Swan Lake Nature Study Area (formerly called Lemmon Valley Marsh) is a small conservation area in Lemmon Valley, Nevada. It contains marsh, alkali mud flats, and high desert. The Lahontan Audubon Society describes it as "a nearly unspoiled wetland in the midst of suburban housing and warehouses" and designates it a Nevada Important Bird Area. It is a notable location for birding; over 150 species have been observed there.

The Swan Lake Nature Study Area consists of over 1,800 acres (7 km^{2}) of land, with water supplied by the nearby Reno/Stead Sewage Treatment Plant. The size of the actual wetland varies seasonally and yearly, depending on the amount of precipitation, between 100 and 1,000 acres (4 km^{2}). It was formally dedicated as a nature study area in 1999, following several years of planning by Reno-area environmentalist/writer/photographer Bob Goodman. The lead organization in planning and creating the conservation area was the Nevada Army National Guard, which contributed about 360 acres (1.5 km^{2}) and performed preliminary ecological studies. Other sponsoring organizations include: the Bureau of Land Management; the City of Reno; the Lahontan Audubon Society; Nevada Division of Wildlife; the Nevada Land Conservancy; Washoe County Parks and Recreation Department; and Washoe County School District. Features include an observational boardwalk into the marsh and educational signs about the local ecology.

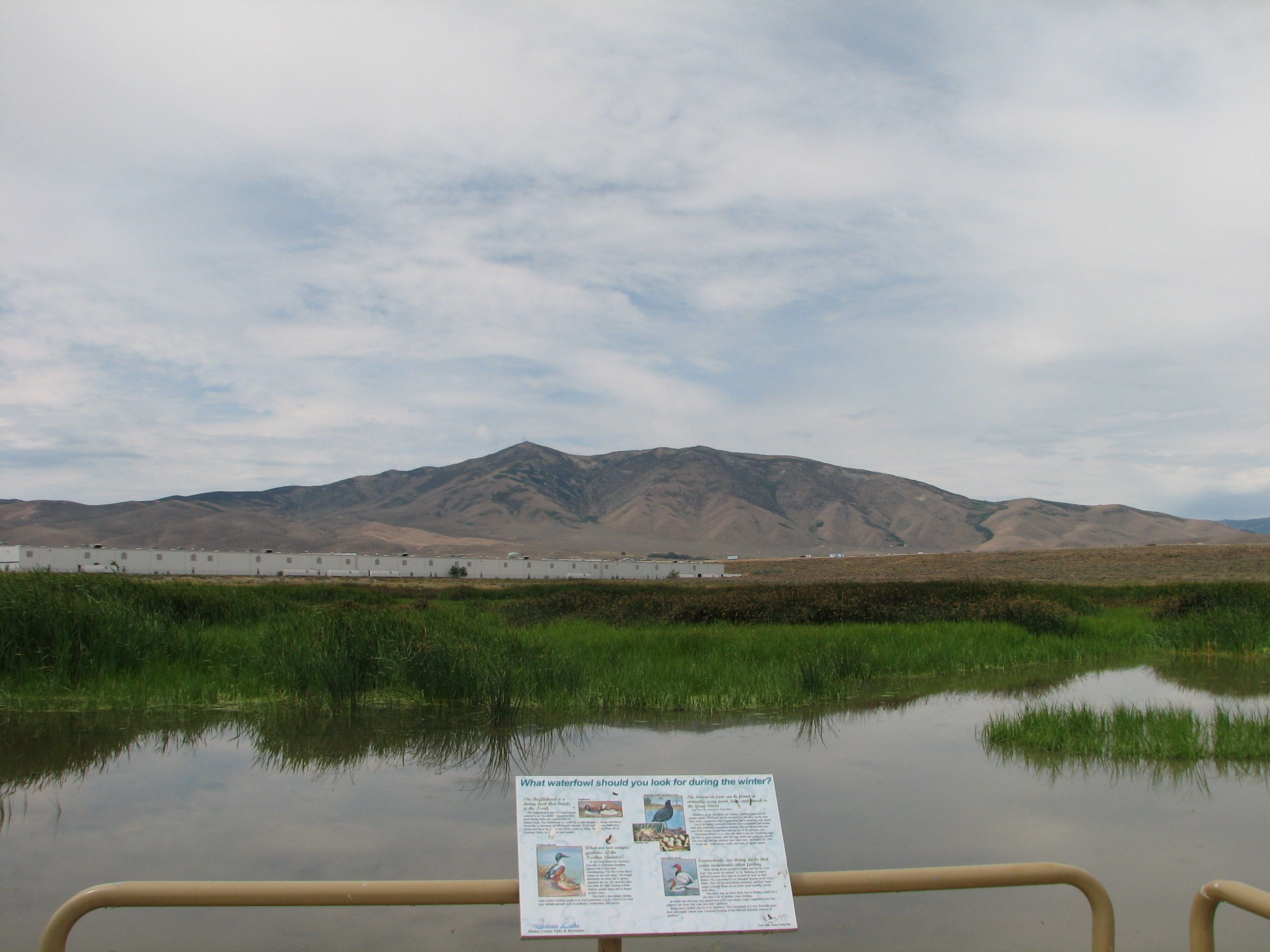
Peavine Peak can be seen from the observation boardwalk.

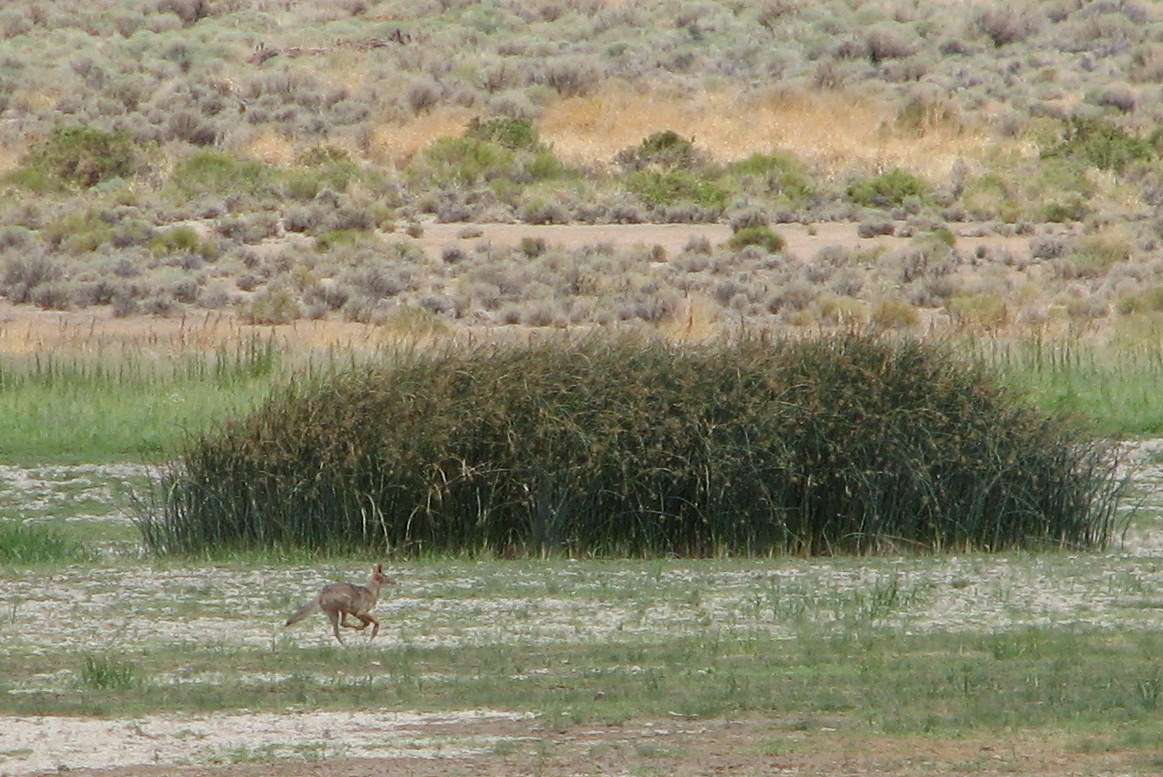
A coyote on alkali mud flats in the nature study area

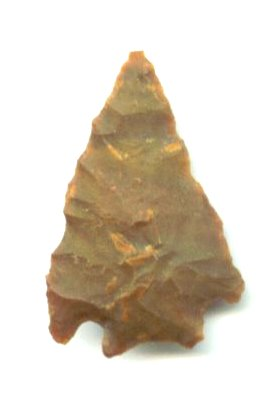
An arrowhead found near Swan Lake

Swan Lake is located in the midst of the rapidly developing suburbs of Stead and Lemmon Valley, near Peavine Peak north of Reno. According to a 1995 study, humans have lived in the area since as early as 400 AD; Native American artifacts attributed to the Washoe people have been found in the area, indicating it to have been a wintering site.
