= Petersen Mountain =

Mountain range in Nevada, United States

- Location within Nevada

Highest point
- Elevation: 2,387 m (7,831 ft)

Geography
- Country: United States
- State: Nevada
- District: Washoe County
- Range coordinates: 39°47′44.665″N 119°58′34.717″W
- Topo map: USGS Granite Peak

Petersen Mountain is a mountain range in Washoe County, Nevada.
