= Golden Valley, Nevada =

- Census-designated place
- Location of Golden Valley, Nevada
- Coordinates: 39°36′55″N 119°49′35″W
- Country: United States
- State: Nevada

Area
  - Total: 3.61 sq mi (9.36 km^{2})
  - Land: 3.61 sq mi (9.36 km^{2})
  - Water: 0 sq mi (0.00 km^{2})
- Elevation: 5,135 ft (1,565 m)

Population (2020)
  - Total: 1,580
  - Density: 437/sq mi (168.8/km^{2})
- Time zone: UTC-8 (Pacific (PST))
  - Summer (DST): UTC-7 (PDT)
- ZIP code: 89506
- FIPS code: 32-28860
- GNIS feature ID: 2583929

Golden Valley is a census-designated place (CDP) in Washoe County, Nevada, United States. As of the 2020 census, Golden Valley had a population of 1,580. It is a northern suburb of the city of Reno and is part of the Reno–Sparks Metropolitan Statistical Area. Prior to 2010, it was listed by the U.S. Census Bureau as part of the Lemmon Valley–Golden Valley CDP.

== Geography ==
Golden Valley is located at 39°36′55″N 119°49′35″W (39.6155, -119.8266), 7 miles (11 km) north of downtown Reno. Lemmon Valley is adjacent to the north.

According to the United States Census Bureau, the CDP has a total area of 3.6 square miles (9.4 km^{2}), all land.

== Demographics ==
Historical population
Census	Pop.	Note	%±
2020	1,580		—
U.S. Decennial Census
