= California Building (Reno, Nevada) =

- U.S. National Register of Historic Places
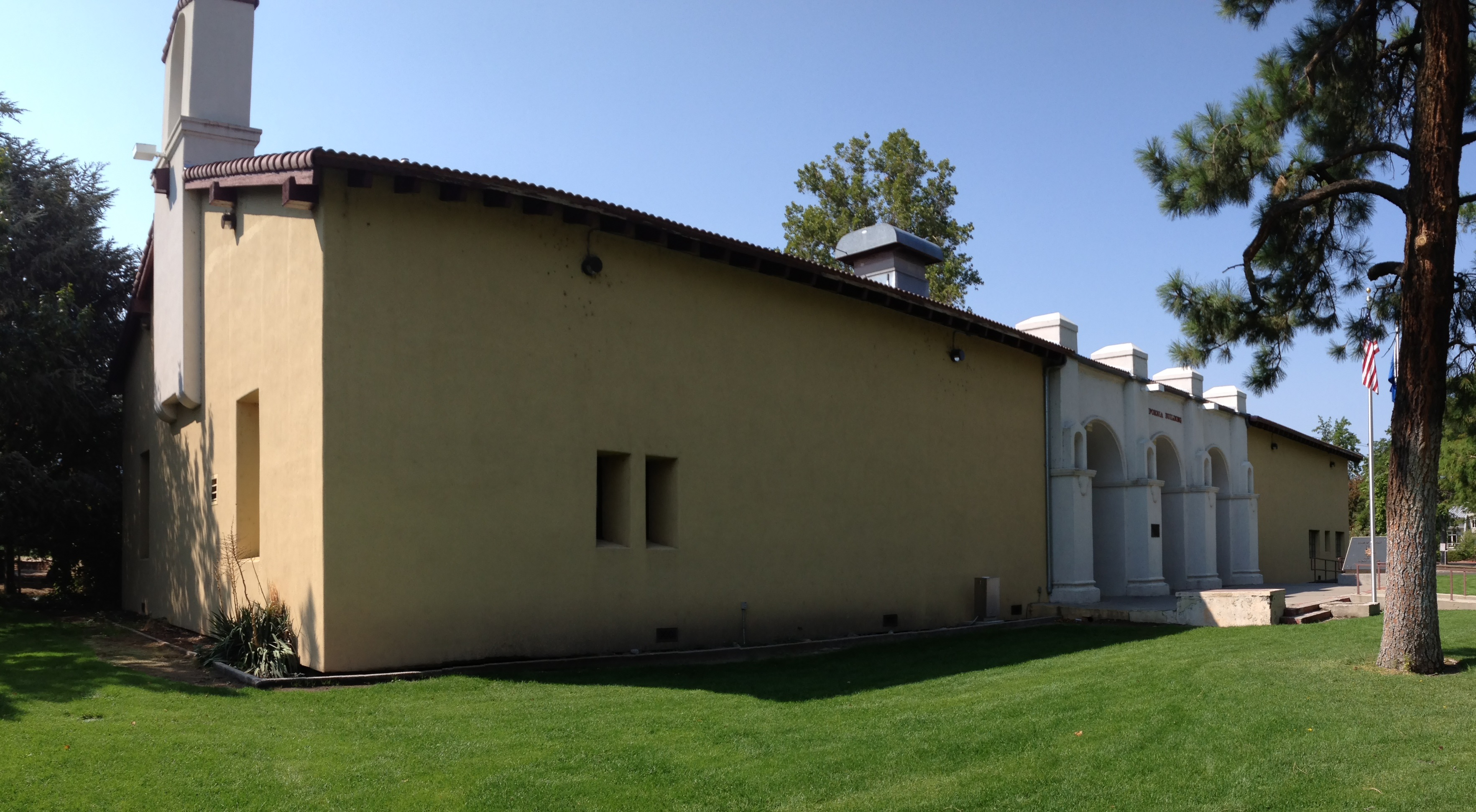
- California Building, 1000 Cowan Dr., Idlewild Park Reno

- Location within Nevada Location within the United States
- Location: 1000 Cowan Dr., Idlewild Park, Reno, Nevada
- Coordinates: 39°31′19″N 119°50′0″W
- Area: less than one acre
- Built: 1925–1927
- Built by: Stuart, J.C., Co.
- Architectural style: Mission/spanish Revival, Spanish Colonial Revival
- NRHP reference No.: 92001257
- Added to NRHP: September 23, 1992

The California Building, located at 1000 Cowan Dr., Idlewild Park, in Reno, Nevada, is a historic building that was built by the state of California for the Transcontinental Highway Exposition of 1927.

== Description and history ==
It hosted exhibits of California cities and counties. After the exposition, it served as a meeting hall for the Darrel Dunkle Post No.l American Legion, until 1938, when ownership was returned to the city of Reno. The building was listed on the National Register of Historic Places in 1992.

The building plus related tent annex and exhibits cost $100,000 and was built over a two-year period concluding in 1927.
