= Parsnip Peak Wilderness =

Wilderness area in Nevada, United States

Coordinates: 38°08′46″N 114°19′31″W

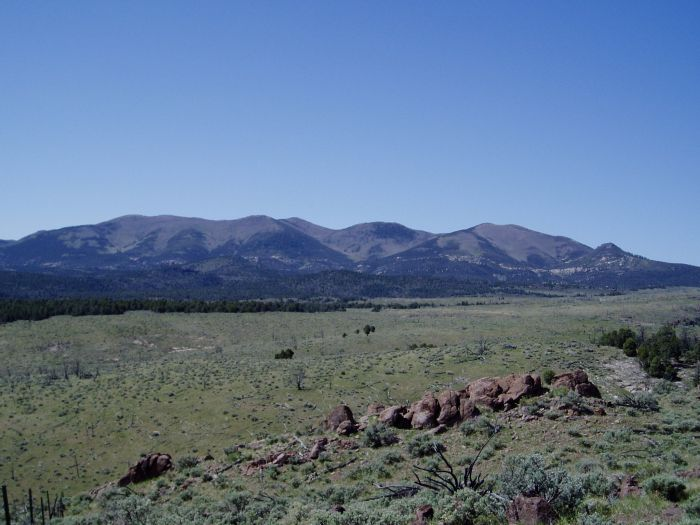
Parsnip Peak Wilderness

Parsnip Peak Wilderness is a 43,693-acre (17,682 ha) wilderness in northeastern Lincoln County, Nevada. Its elevations range from 6,160 to 8,916 feet (1,878 to 2,718 m). It received wilderness status in 2004.

The area, which lies within the Wilson Creek Range, contains prehistoric sites, including the Mount Wilson Archaeological District. Its vegetation includes aspen groves, grasslands, mountain mahogany, and sagebrush, and it serves as a habitat for elk, mule deer, and raptors, including the northern goshawk.
