= Truckee Meadows Fire Protection District =

Fire protection district in Nevada, USA

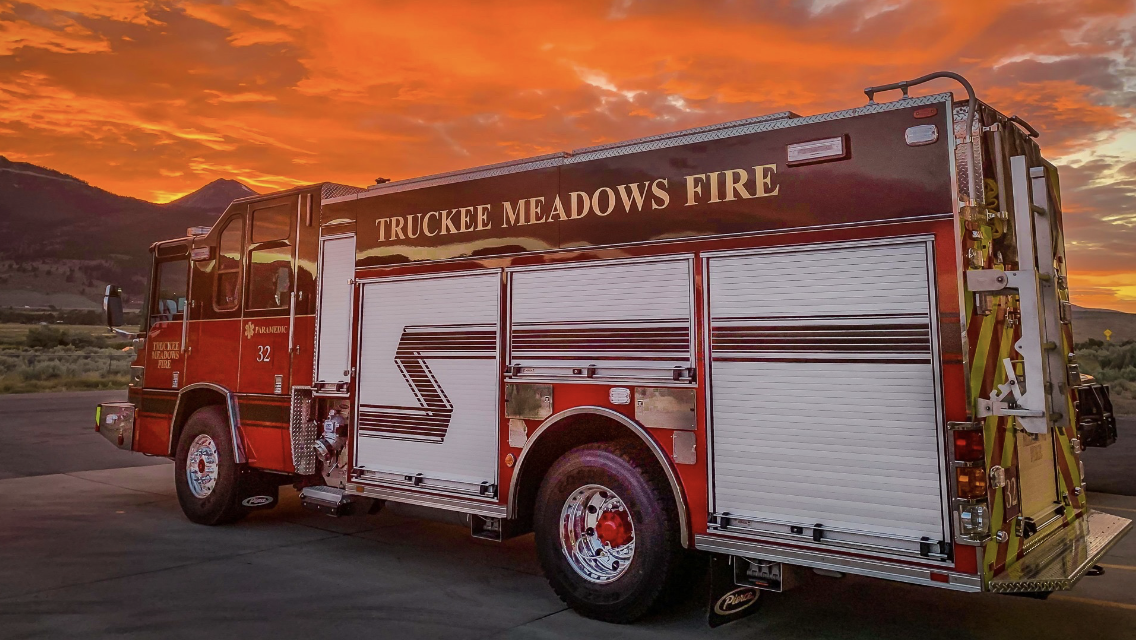
Engine 32

The Truckee Meadows Fire Protection District is a fire protection district that covers Washoe County, Nevada and the eastern slopes of the Sierra Nevada Mountains in Western Nevada. The district spans an area of nearly 6,600 square miles in the northwest section of the state bordering California and Oregon. TMFPD was originally founded in 1972 and operated independently until 2001. Washoe County contracted the City of Reno Fire Dept. to operate TMFPD engines until 2012. Early in 2012, the agreement with the City of Reno was terminated and TMFPD was stood back up and operated independently again. The Truckee Meadows Fire Protection District operates a fire apparatus fleet of 10 engines, 1 ladder company, 11 brush trucks, 1 rescue squad, 1 ambulance, 1 hazardous material unit, various support units, 2 technical rescue support units, 9 water tenders, and 2 water rescue entry vehicles The District's primary areas of responsibility include rural and suburban communities outside the City of Reno. Truckee Meadows Fire Protection District responded to 10,581 calls for service with a 2017/2018 budget of $27,932,275.

The Truckee Meadows Fire Protection District provides all risk fire and Advanced Life Support level Emergency Medical Services (Paramedic) to unincorporated areas of Washoe County. The District's emergency response encompasses approximately 214 square miles of territory on the eastern slope of the Carson and Sierra Nevada Mountain range, the second most populated county in the State. The Truckee Meadows Fire Protection District operates 11 career fire stations within Washoe County, Nevada as an "all risk” fire agency capable of responding to structure fires, wildland fires, hazardous materials incidents and emergency medical incidents. The Truckee Meadows Fire Protection District is a first response unit, deploying first line fire control and or initiating rescue operations and providing advanced life support for emergency medical calls throughout the county. Based on the resources and capabilities of the Truckee Meadows Fire Protection District, the Insurance Services Organization (ISO) has rated them as a Class 3/10 department. The Truckee Meadows Fire Protection District also assists other fire protection agencies within the county, and at the border of Nevada and California.

The demographics of Washoe County covers 6,540.4 square miles. There are approximately 42,154 households in the unincorporated areas with an estimated population of 419,948. The average household size in 2007 was estimated at 2.70. With the rapid population growth and urban development within the county, the department assist in the education and understanding of fire ecology and exposure to risk for its residents.

== Mutual aid ==
Mutual aid is the assistance from one fire department to another when specific equipment has been requested after the initial dispatch to an emergency incident. The Truckee Meadows Fire Protection District merged with the Sierra Fire Protection District and has mutual aid or automatic aid agreements with the following agencies:

== Agencies ==
- Sparks Fire Department
- Reno Fire Department
- North lake Tahoe Fire Protection District
- Nevada Division of Forestry
- Nevada Air National Guard
- United States Forest Service
- Bureau of Land Management
- Carson City Fire Department
- Tahoe Regional Fire Chiefs
- Storey County Fire
- Sierra County Fire (California)
- Cal Fire

== Training within these specialties include ==
- Flood Hazard
- Water Rescue Scenarios
- Hazardous Materials
- Wildland Fire and fires in the Wildland/Urban Interface
- Risk Assessment
- Paramedic Advanced Life Support

== District stations ==
Battalion-30

- Station 30 3905 Old Hwy 395, Washoe Valley

Engine-30 Brush-30 Tender-30 Medic-30

- Station 32 1240 East Lake Blvd., Washoe Valley

Engine-32 Brush-32 Tender-32 Boat-32

- Station 33 470 Foothill Rd., Reno

Engine-33 Ladder-33 Brush-33 Tender-33

- Station 35 10201 W. 4th St., Mogul

Changed to station 40

- Station 36 13500 Thomas Creek Rd., Reno

Engine-36 Brush-36 Tender-36

- Station 37 3255 Hidden Valley Dr., Reno

Engine-37 Brush-37 Tender-37

- Station 39 4000 Joy Lake Rd., Reno

Engine-39 Brush-39 Tender-39

Battalion-40

- Station 40

Engine-40 Brush-40 Tender-40

- Station 42 3680 Diamond Peak Dr., Reno, NV

Engine-42 Brush-42 Tender-42

- Station 44 10575 Silver Lake Blvd., Stead

Engine-44 Brush-44 Tender-44

- Station 45 110 Quartz Lane, Sun Valley

Engine-45 Brush-45 Tender-45 Medic-45

- Station 46 500 Rockwell Blvd., Spanish Springs

Engine-46 Brush-46 Tender-46 Medic-46
