= Washoe Zephyr =

Seasonal wind in Nevada, US

The Washoe Zephyr is a seasonal diurnal wind which occurs across western Nevada just east of the Sierra Nevada mountains. It blows primarily in the summer from mid afternoon until late in the evening from the west to southwest, becoming quite gusty. As the terrain is generally arid, the Washoe Zephyr typically lifts a considerable quantity of dust into the atmosphere.

The Washoe Zephyr runs contrary to the usual pattern of diurnal mountain slope winds (upslope daytime, downslope nighttime) and thus its exact mechanism is still being studied. One hypothesis is that the wind is caused by intense heating over the Great Basin during summer afternoons. The heating causes a thermal low to develop which sets up a pressure gradient which induces the wind, pulling cooler air down from the High Sierra.

The Washoe Zephyr first gained notoriety from a passage written by Mark Twain in his 1872 book Roughing It.

The wind played a role in a large fire which Twain claimed to have accidentally set. This same wind may have played a key role in the Angora Fire of June 2007. It may also have played a role in the disappearance of millionaire flier Steve Fossett in September 2007.
