= Lemmon Valley, Nevada =

- Census-designated place
- Location of Lemmon Valley, Nevada
- Coordinates: 39°39′50″N 119°49′37″W
- Country: United States
- State: Nevada

Area
  - Total: 17.14 sq mi (44.39 km^{2})
  - Land: 15.94 sq mi (41.29 km^{2})
  - Water: 1.20 sq mi (3.10 km^{2})
- Elevation: 4,990 ft (1,520 m)

Population (2020)
  - Total: 4,987
  - Density: 312.8/sq mi (120.77/km^{2})
- Time zone: UTC-8 (Pacific (PST))
  - Summer (DST): UTC-7 (PDT)
- ZIP code: 89506
- FIPS code: 32-41800
- GNIS feature ID: 2652366

Lemmon Valley is a census-designated place (CDP) in Washoe County, Nevada, United States. As of the 2020 census, Lemmon Valley had a population of 4,987. It is a northern suburb of the city of Reno and is part of the Reno–Sparks Metropolitan Statistical Area. Prior to 2010 it was listed by the U.S. Census Bureau as part of the Lemmon Valley–Golden Valley CDP.

== Geography ==
Lemmon Valley is located at 39°39′50″N 119°49′37″W (39.6638, -119.8270), some 10 miles (16 km) north of downtown Reno. Golden Valley is adjacent to the south.

According to the United States Census Bureau, the CDP has a total area of 18.4 square miles (47.6 km^{2}), of which 17.2 square miles (44.5 km^{2}) is land and 1.2 square miles (3.1 km^{2}), or 6.57%, is water, consisting mainly of the Swan Lake Nature Study Area, a small wetland conservation area home to many bird species.

== Demographics ==
Historical population
Census	Pop.	Note	%±
2020	4,987		—
U.S. Decennial Census

=== 2020 census ===
As of the 2020 census, Lemmon Valley had a population of 4,987. The median age was 43.5 years. 20.0% of residents were under the age of 18 and 19.0% of residents were 65 years of age or older. For every 100 females there were 108.9 males, and for every 100 females age 18 and over there were 111.1 males age 18 and over.

86.8% of residents lived in urban areas, while 13.2% lived in rural areas.

There were 1,823 households in Lemmon Valley, of which 26.3% had children under the age of 18 living in them. Of all households, 51.2% were married-couple households, 21.2% were households with a male householder and no spouse or partner present, and 17.7% were households with a female householder and no spouse or partner present. About 20.1% of all households were made up of individuals and 10.3% had someone living alone who was 65 years of age or older.

There were 1,896 housing units, of which 3.9% were vacant. The homeowner vacancy rate was 1.0% and the rental vacancy rate was 5.0%.

Racial composition as of the 2020 census
Race	Number	Percent
White	3,602	72.2%
Black or African American	27	0.5%
American Indian and Alaska Native	92	1.8%
Asian	62	1.2%
Native Hawaiian and Other Pacific Islander	9	0.2%
Some other race	540	10.8%
Two or more races	655	13.1%
Hispanic or Latino (of any race)	1,195	24.0%

== Notable people ==
- Johanna Burton, Director of the Museum of Contemporary Art, Los Angeles
