= Peavine Peak =

Mountain in the American state of Nevada

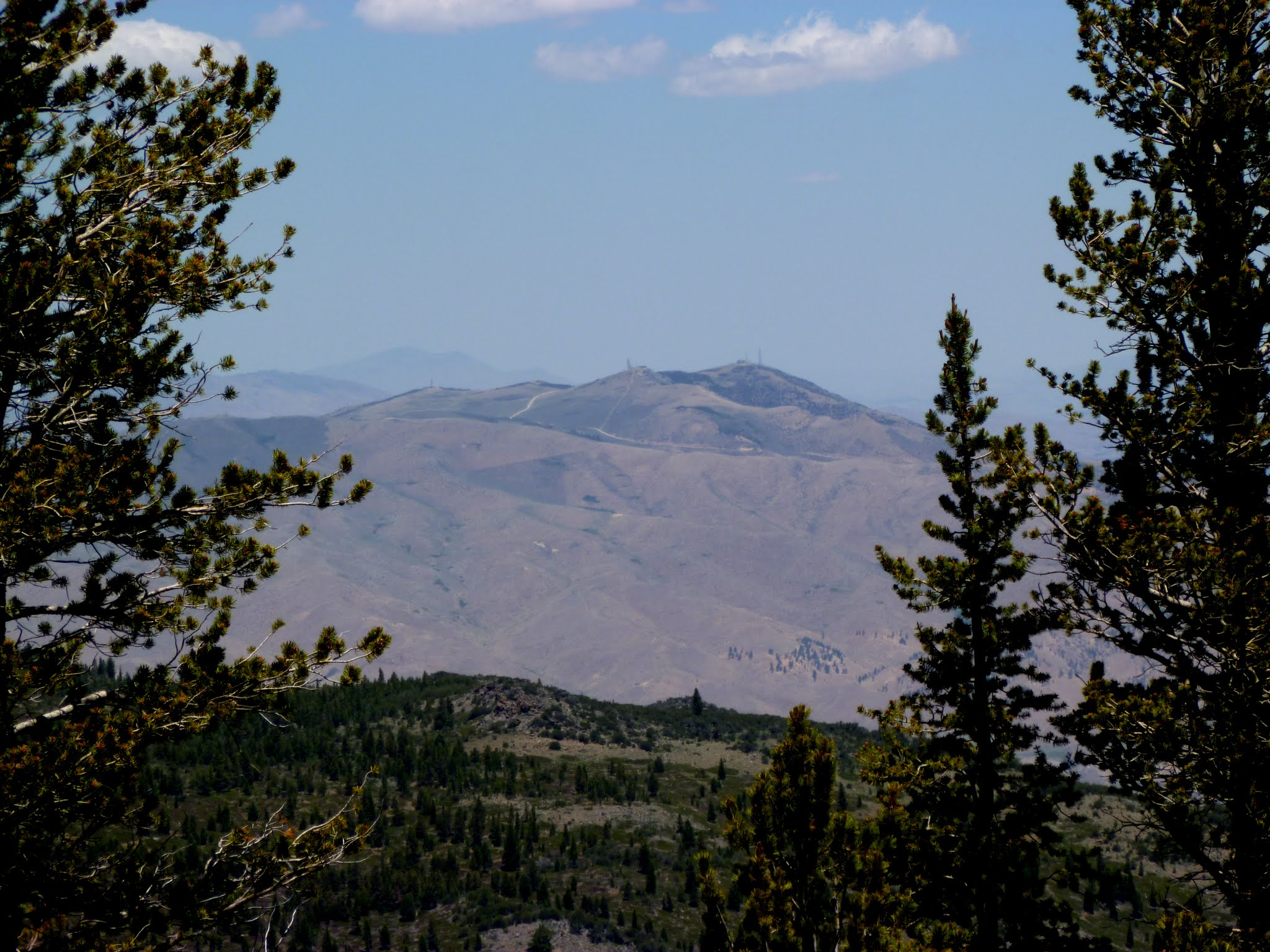

Highest point
- Elevation: 8,269 ft (2,520 m)
- Prominence: 2,186 ft (666 m)
- Coordinates: 39°35′13″N 119°55′56″W

Geography
- Location within Nevada
- Location: Washoe County, Nevada
- Topo map: USGS Verdi

Peavine Peak, the highest point on Peavine mountain, is located in Washoe County, Nevada, at the northwest corner of the Truckee Meadows and about 3.5 miles (5.6 km) due east of the California state line. It forms one of the most dominant geographical features in the Reno/Sparks area. Early prospectors to the mountain discovered wild pea vines growing in the vicinity of Peavine Springs on the northeast flank of the mountain, near Poeville, hence the name.

== Geology ==
Much of the northern Truckee Meadows is built atop Peavine alluvium, most significantly from just west of Lake Park in Northwest Reno, across the campus of the University of Nevada, Reno, and toward Proctor Hug High School in Northeast Reno. Above these alluvial deposits, the sediments become coarser and are frequently interspersed with diatomaceous material.

Where the gentler lower slopes of the foothills join the significantly steeper slopes of the mountain proper, the sediments give way to their igneous parents. U.S. Route 395 traverses the so-called Alta Formation, which is composed largely of pyroxene andesite flows, flow breccia, and laharic breccia. On the flanks of Peavine Mountain, the Alta Formation is frequently interrupted by rhyolite plugs and hornblende andesites of the Kate Peak Formation.

The higher reaches of the mountain display large outcroppings of granodiorite, many of which predominate the features on the upper reaches of the south slope. In addition, one of the most common features of Peavine's geology is the so-called Peavine Sequence, Mesozoic-aged altered and unaltered metavolcanic rock composed of a variety of material, including rhyolite flows and pyroclastics, dacite, andesite, and laharic breccias.

== History ==
=== Native American presence ===
With the discovery of dozens of archaeological sites on Peavine and in the surrounding areas, it is apparent that aboriginal Great Basin cultures were active in this area. The predominant cultures were those of the Washo and Northern Paiute peoples, their artifacts having been found at locations ranging from Bull Ranch, at the southern terminus of Bull Ranch Creek on the southern flank of the mountain, to the shores of White Lake north of the Peavine (Many of these sites have been found above the 6,000 foot level). Extant artifacts have been traced to both the Kings Beach (ca. 500-1500 A.D.) and Martis (ca. 2000 B.C. to 500A.D.) cultures at sites primarily located within the Truckee River drainage.

=== Modern history and development ===
Mineral values were extracted from placer deposits as early as 1856 by prospectors returning to California. These small-scale operations lasted only as long as the water in the stream beds permitted, at which times the miners would clear off and move on. Such intermittent placer mining continued through the 1860s.

A prospector named John Poe, allegedly a cousin of Edgar Allan Poe, came to the area ca. 1862, and soon established the Poe Mining Company. He began work at the Paymaster Mine, and developed and platted the townsite of Poeville on the northeast side of the mountain. Poeville maintained a post office from September 1, 1874 to March 22, 1878.

Aside from Poeville, at least two townsites developed, however briefly, on or immediately near Peavine Mountain:

- Webster, named for Daniel Webster, was platted in August, 1873 by "Parties interested in the Peavine District, (who) laid out a town in the vicinity of the mines..."
- Brooklyn, named for the New York Borough, was settled in March, 1875, on the southeast face of the mountain about midway between Reno and Verdi. Established by one Charles W. Bever, by 1876 the town was home to five families and contained a dozen or so buildings, although the 'boom' was to be short lived. Later that same year, John Poe persuaded Bever into a newfound interest in another operation on the eastern flank of the mountain, and Brooklyn was finished. In March 1879, the remaining buildings were purchased and moved into Reno.

== Recreation ==
Due to its proximity to the Reno-Sparks area, Peavine is attractive to and popular with all varieties of outdoor enthusiasts. Under the stewardship of the Humboldt–Toiyabe National Forest (HTNF), many miles of hiking and mountain bike trails have been added, and the varied geography provides a range of challenges. Peavine is also a favorite for off-road vehicles, although access has become increasingly restricted in the past fifteen years from Northwest Reno, due largely to residential building in that area. The HTNF maintains assorted access points across this area on the southwest flank of the mountain, some allowing for motor vehicles, with others designed for pedestrian traffic; access from the east and the north is substantially less regulated.

To service and install the radio towers and transmitters located on the peak and on several promontories, an access road was constructed, winding up the north and east faces of the mountain. Weather permitting, this road is passable by most two-wheel-drive vehicles with modest undercarriage clearance and extends to the uppermost summit.
