= Cold Springs, Washoe County, Nevada =

Cold Springs Valley, Nevada
- Census-designated place
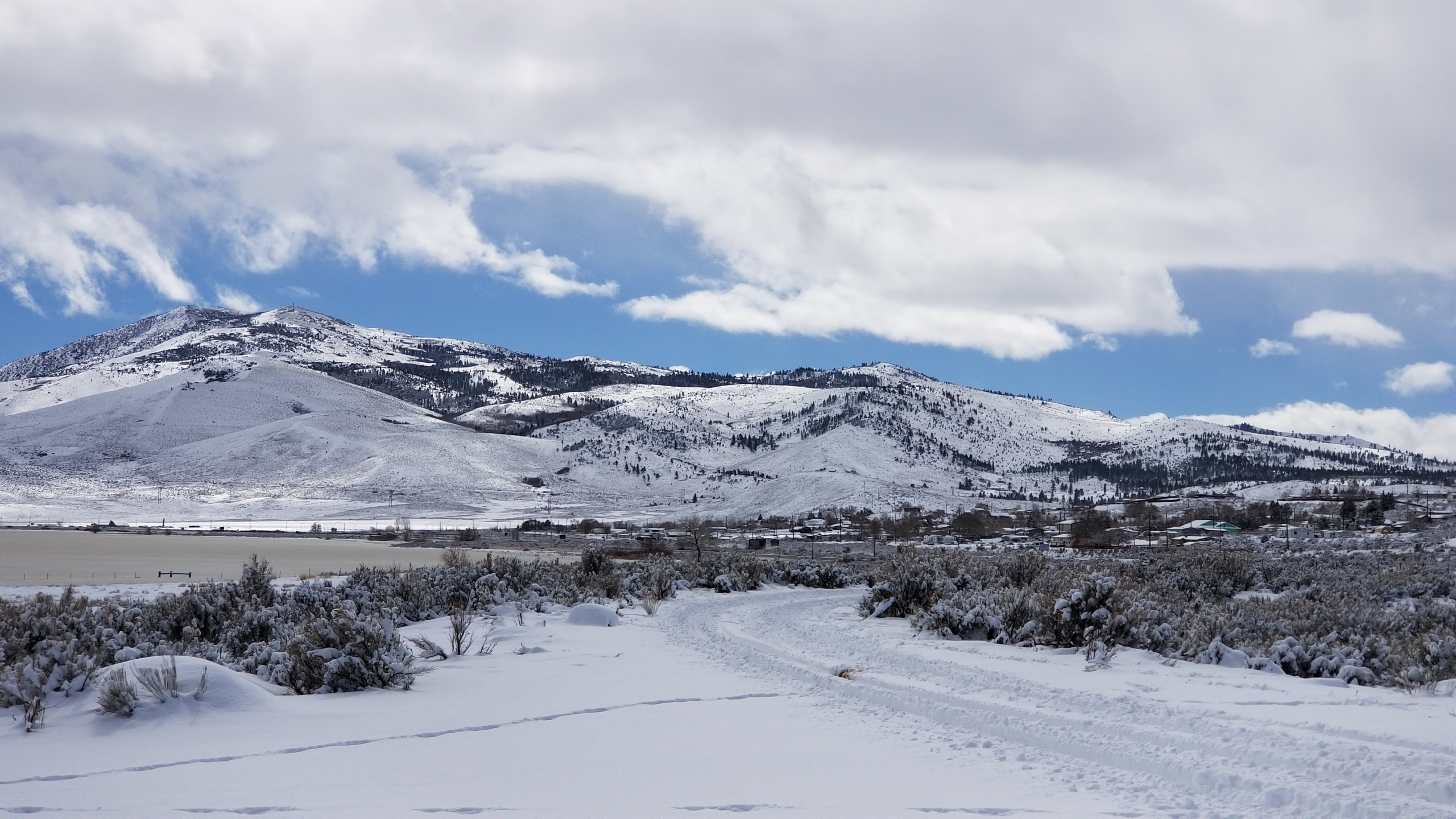
- A scene of Cold Springs, White Lake, and Peavine Mountain in Winter.

- Location of Cold Springs within the State of Nevada
- Coordinates: 39°40′37″N 119°58′4″W
- Country: United States
- State: Nevada
- County: Washoe

Area
  - Total: 8.76 sq mi (22.69 km^{2})
  - Land: 8.76 sq mi (22.69 km^{2})
  - Water: 0 sq mi (0.00 km^{2})
- Elevation: 5,059 ft (1,542 m)

Population (2020)
  - Total: 10,153
  - Density: 1,159.2/sq mi (447.56/km^{2})
- Time zone: UTC-8 (Pacific (PST))
  - Summer (DST): UTC-7 (PDT)
- ZIP code: 89508
- Area code: 775
- FIPS code: 32-14090
- GNIS feature ID: 1852655

Cold Springs is a census-designated place (CDP) in Washoe County, Nevada, United States. It is known as Eitse'ihpaa or Eitse'ippaa (literally "cold water" or "cold spring") in Shoshoni. It is located just off U.S. Route 395 in the northwestern part of the Reno–Sparks Metropolitan Statistical Area, adjacent to the California state line. The population was 10,153 at the 2020 census.

== Geography ==
Cold Springs is located at 39°40′37″N 119°58′4″W (39.676916, -119.967643).

According to the United States Census Bureau, the CDP has a total area of 8.8 square miles (22.7 km^{2}), all land.

== Demographics ==
Historical population
Census	Pop.	Note	%±
2000	3,834		—
2010	8,544		122.8%
2020	10,153		18.8%
U.S. Decennial Census

As of the census of 2020, there were 10,153 people and 3,700 households residing in the CDP. The population density was 1,159 inhabitants per square mile (447/km^{2}). There were 3,700 housing units at an average density of 422.4 per square mile (163.1/km^{2}). The racial makeup of the CDP was 75.7% White, 1.4% African American, 1.4% Native American, 1.9% Asian, 0.5% Pacific Islander, 6.5% from other races, and 12.7% from two or more races. Hispanic or Latino of any race were 18.1% of the population.

There were 10,153 households, out of which 30.9% had children under the age of 18 living with them, 62.2% were married couples living together, 14.0% had a male householder with no spouse present, 17.4% had a female householder with no spouse present, and 6.4% were non-families. The average family size was 3.49.

In the CDP, the population was spread out, with 31.3% under the age of 18, 4.6% from 18 to 24, 34.3% from 25 to 44, 24.2% from 45 to 64, and 5.6% who were 65 years of age or older. The median age was 35 years. For every 100 females, there were 104.4 males. For every 100 females age 18 and over, there were 104.0 males.

The median income for a household in the CDP was $93,732. About 3.9% of the population were below the poverty line, including 1.8% of those under age 18 and 9.5% of those age 65 or over.

== See also ==
- List of census-designated places in Nevada
