= Ranger Road Fire =

2026 wildfire in Oklahoma and Kansas

- Part of the 2026 Oklahoma wildfires and 2026 Kansas wildfires
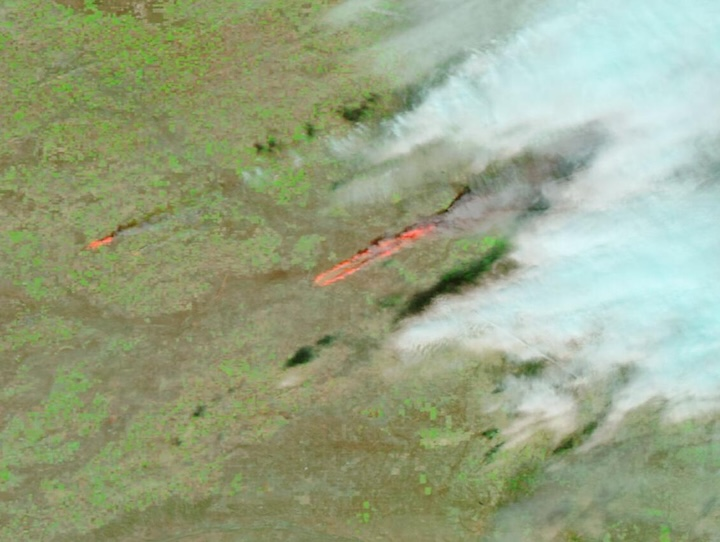
- Image captured February 17, 2026, by the VIIRS instrument aboard the joint NASA/NOAA NOAA-20 platform.
- Date: February 17, 2026 – February 24, 2026
- Location: Harper County, Oklahoma, Woods County, Oklahoma, Comanche County, Kansas, Clark County, Kansas, Beaver County, Oklahoma, Meade County, Kansas
- Coordinates: 36.80660°N 100.5068°W

Statistics
- Burned area: 283,283 acres (114,641 ha)

Impacts
- Injuries: 4

Ignition
- Cause: Under Investigation

Map
- Perimeter map of Ranger Road Fire (map data)

The Ranger Road Fire was a wildfire that was burning in Harper County, Beaver County, and Woods County, Oklahoma, and Comanche County, Clark County, and Meade County, Kansas. As of February 24, the fire had burned 283,283 acres (114,641 ha). Up until that point, it was the largest wildfire in the United States during the 2026 wildfire season, surpassed only by Nebraska's Morill fire.

== Background ==
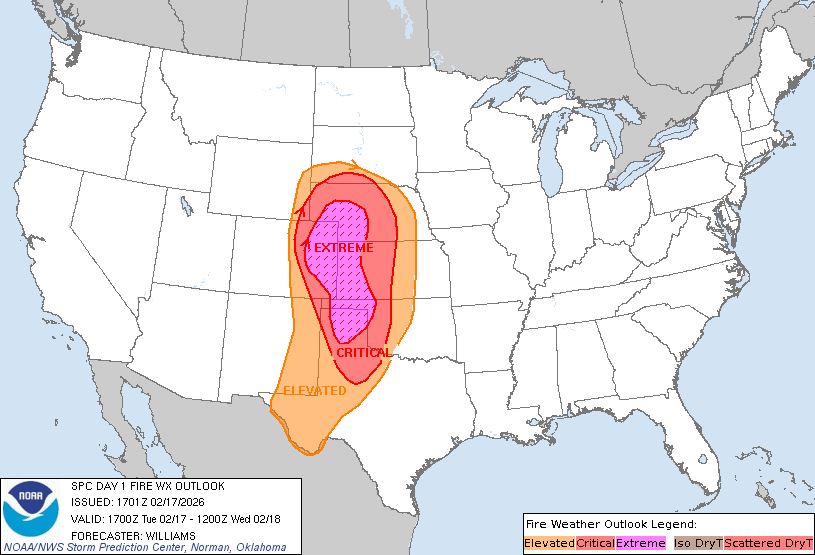
Storm Prediction Center fire weather outlook for February 17, showing an "Extremely Critical" risk for fire weather.

The National Weather Service Storm Prediction Center issued a Day 1 Fire Weather Outlook for February 17, 2026, highlighting an Extremely Critical risk for western Kansas and the Oklahoma Panhandle. Driven by 23–35 miles per hour (37–56 km/h) winds, and 10-15% humidity, and exceptionally dry fuels, the conditions created a high-impact, rapid fire spread environment.

== Progression ==
The Ranger Road Fire was first reported at approximately 11:40 a.m. CST on February 17, 2026, southeast of Beaver, Oklahoma. The cause remains under investigation. The fire ignited on the same day as the 43 Road, Side Road, and Stevens fires were reported in the nearby counties of Stevens County, Kansas, Seward County, Kansas, Texas County, Oklahoma, and Woodward County, Oklahoma.

Fueled by warm, dry, and windy conditions, the fire expanded rapidly to the northeast—starting out at 15,000 acres within an hour but continuing to expand all of the way to 145,000 acres (59,000 ha) acres within nine hours, jumping several roads and highways, crossing the state line into Kansas, shortly after impacting Englewood, and continuing to burn for the rest of the evening and then all night long now to the east, crossing highway 183 and eventually burning into Comanche county. Fire officials reported extreme gusts of wind exceeding 65 miles per hour (105 km/h), limiting aerial firefighting operations and complicating suppression efforts during the first stages of the fire's expansion.

By February 18, the fire had nearly doubled in size to 283,283 acres (114,641 ha) due to better mapping. The fire remained at 0% containment. At approximately 7:57 p.m. CST on February 18, 2026 the National Interagency Fire Center announced the fire was 15% contained. By February 19, 2026, the National Interagency Fire Center announced the fire was 20% contained. On February 20, 2026, the National Interagency Fire Center updated the information to say fire was 30% contained. By February 22, 2026, significant progress was made on containing the fire, reaching 65% containment and By February 23, the fire was 90% contained. Finally, at 6:15 p.m. CST on February 24, the National Interagency Fire Center reported that the fire was 100% contained at 283,283 acres (114,641 ha).

== Effects ==
The fire prompted the closures of sections of Kansas Highway 283, Kansas Highway 160, and Kansas Highway 183. Level 3 evacuation orders were issued by the Oklahoma Forestry Services and the Kansas Forestry Service in the Oklahoma Panhandle and Southwestern Kansas for Clark County, Kansas (Ashland, Kansas and Englewood, Kansas) and Comanche County, Kansas. Four injuries were reported among firefighters in Beaver County. Many ranchers in Southwest Kansas lost hundreds of head of cattle. Fire weather warnings were issued several times during the fire's initial expansion, and Multiple structures have been damaged or destroyed in Knowles, Oklahoma, Englewood, Kansas, and surrounding areas.

Evacuees had been instructed to head east towards Coldwater, Kansas, where a shelter had been established at the South Central High School gymnasium. Additional evacuation orders were issued in Woodward, Oklahoma, with shelters opening at the Mooreland Community Center, Mooreland United Methodist Church, and Vici Community Building.

== Growth and containment ==
Fire containment status Gray: contained; Red: active; %: percent contained;
| Date | Area burned | Personnel | Containment |
|---|---|---|---|
| February 17 | 145,000 acres (587 km^{2}) | 16 | |
| February 18 | 283,283 acres (1,146 km^{2}) | 16 | |
| February 19 | 283,283 acres (1,146 km^{2}) | 16 | |
| February 20 | 283,283 acres (1,146 km^{2}) | 11 | |
| February 21 | 283,283 acres (1,146 km^{2}) | 11 | |
| February 22 | 283,283 acres (1,146 km^{2}) | 11 | |
| February 23 | 283,283 acres (1,146 km^{2}) | 6 | |
| February 24 | 283,283 acres (1,146 km^{2}) | 5 | |

== See also ==
- 2026 United States wildfires
- 2026 Oklahoma wildfires
