= Kiowa Creek =

Kiowa Creek may refer to:

- Kiowa Creek (Colorado)
- Kiowa Creek (Kansas)
- Kiowa Creek (Texas/Oklahoma)
