= 2026 Kansas wildfires =

Natural disasters in the USA

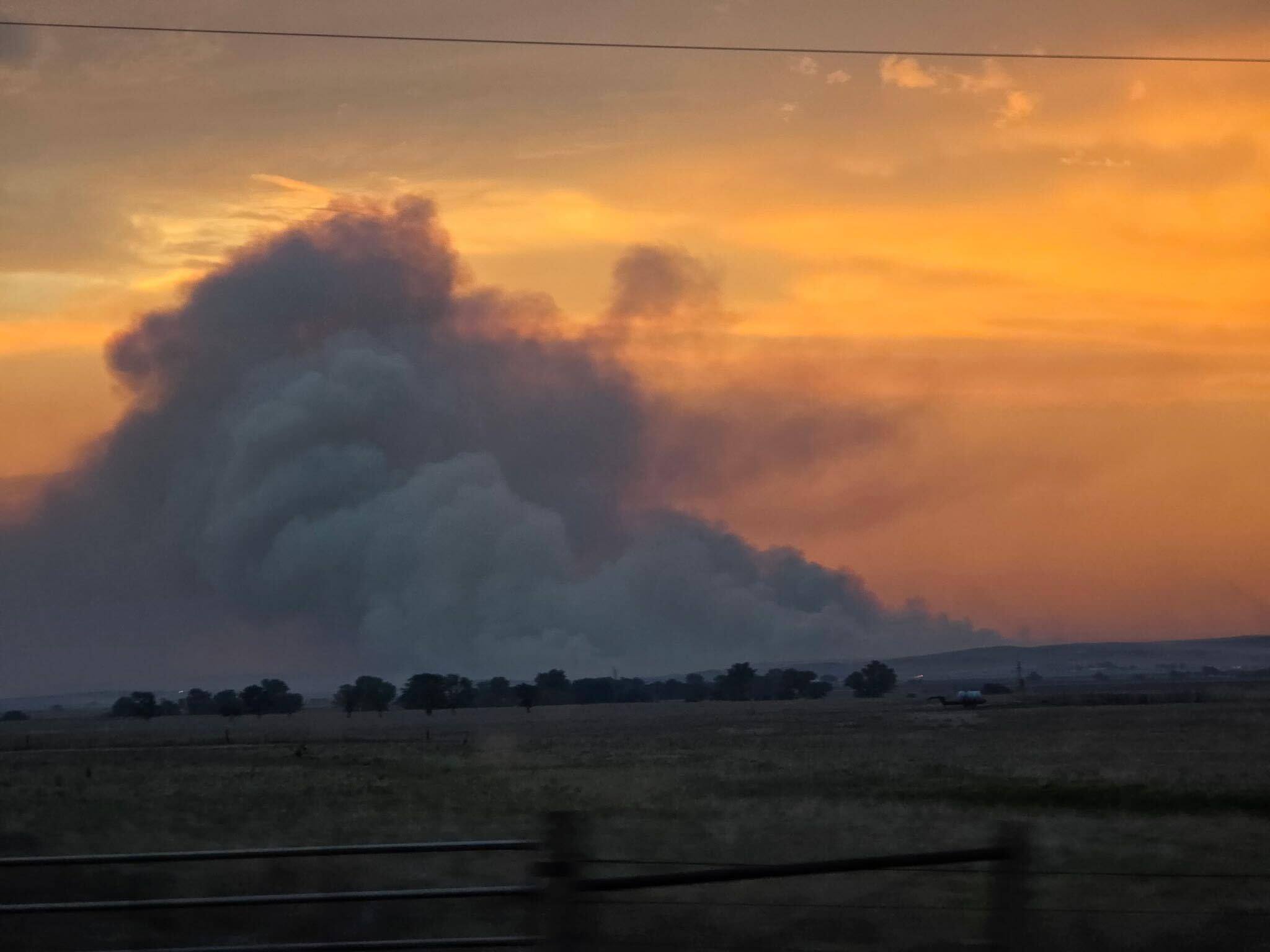
- The Meade Lake Complex on May 14

The 2026 Kansas wildfires are a series of wildfires that are burning throughout the U.S. state of Kansas.

== Background ==
Kansas regularly experiences its most active wildfire period during March and April, before vegetation begins to green up. This is due to a combination of dry fuels, strong winds, and low humidity—conditions that foster fast-spreading fires. In 2014, Kansas recorded a record 8,075 wildfires, burning 187,000 acres, following this typical seasonal pattern.

Weather patterns are a primary driver of these outbreaks. Kansas State University meteorologist Chip Redmond emphasizes that short-term, weather-driven events—such as dry frontal passages with strong winds—are far more responsible for Kansas megafires than longer-term drought conditions. These dynamic systems, common in early spring, often produce the ignition and spread conditions that state firefighting resources must scramble to contain.

Land managers also recognize that burning during the growing season (July to September) can offer safer, more controlled outcomes when compared to the volatile dormant-season fires. Growing-season burns are conducted under higher humidity and more predictable conditions, reducing the likelihood of fires escaping control. These prescribed burns serve ecosystem functions such as woody vegetation management and improved wildlife habitat, although they do produce more smoke and must be carefully scheduled.

More recently, Climate Central’s analysis confirms that Kansas is experiencing more frequent "fire weather" days characterized by hot, dry, and windy conditions. This trend is extending the potential wildfire season beyond historical norms and putting added strain on local firefighters and rural communities. Alarmingly, fires caused by human negligence—like unattended campfires or equipment sparks—account for nearly 87% of wildfire ignitions in the state.

== List of wildfires ==
The following is a list of fires that burned more than 1,000 acres (400 ha), produced significant structural damage, or resulted in casualties.

Name	County	Acres	Start date	Containment date (Note: Containment means that fire crews have established and secured control lines around the fire's perimeter. These lines are artificial barriers, like trenches or cleared vegetation, designed to stop the fire's spread, or natural barriers like rivers. Containment reflects progress in managing the fire but does not necessarily mean the fire is starved of fuel, under control, or put out.)	Notes	Ref
Ranger Road	Beaver (OK), Harper (OK), Clark (KS), Comanche (KS), Meade (KS)	283,283	February 17	February 24	Caused evacuation orders for the communities of Englewood and Ashland in Kansas.	
Stevens	Texas (OK), Seward (KS), Stevens (KS)	12,428	February 17	February 23	Caused evacuations for the community of Tyrone.	
Tennis	Finney	5,000	February 17	February 20	Burned thousands of acres, stretching 11 miles long.	
Andrew Lane	Meade, Seward	7,217	February 17	March 2		
Rawlins Co TP	Rawlins	1,521	March 3	March 3		
Gray Road	Butler	1,279	March 21	March 24		
Salt	Rice, Stafford	1,075	March 26	March 30		
Arkansas River	Edwards	1,000	April 16	April 16	Burned southwest of Kinsley.	
311 Konza	Geary	1,446	May 4	May 4		
51	Morton	12,840	May 14	May 24	Burned northwest of Rolla in Cimarron National Grassland. Was part of a series of fires that caused an emergency declaration. Merged with the Windmill Fire.	
Meade Lake Complex	Meade	92,733	May 14	May 21	Burned in Plains. Closing K-23, U.S. Route 160, and Meade State Park. Cancelled schools part of Meade Public Schools on May 15. Part of a series of fires causing an emergency declaration. Consisted of the Meade Co Complex 1 & 2 fires, Proffitt Lake Fire, Lexington Fire and 2 other fires.	
Herman Ranch Complex	Clark	33,694	May 17	90%	Prompted evacuations with a shelter at Coldwater High School. Burning south of Minneola. Consists of the Herman Ranch & Bouziden Ranch fires.	

== See also ==
- 2026 United States wildfires
