= Protection Township, Kansas =

Protection Township
- Township
- Location in Comanche County
- Coordinates: 37°12′30″N 099°28′01″W
- Country: United States
- State: Kansas
- County: Comanche

Area
  - Total: 173.56 sq mi (449.52 km^{2})
  - Land: 173.07 sq mi (448.26 km^{2})
  - Water: 0.49 sq mi (1.26 km^{2}) 0.28%
- Elevation: 1,850 ft (564 m)

Population (2020)
  - Total: 656
  - Density: 3.79/sq mi (1.46/km^{2})
- GNIS ID: 470825

Protection Township is a township in Comanche County, Kansas, United States. As of the 2020 census, its population was 656.

== Geography ==
Protection Township covers an area of 173.56 square miles (449.5 km^{2}) and contains one incorporated settlement, Protection. According to the USGS, it contains two cemeteries: Mennonite and Protection.

The township borders Oklahoma on the south.

The streams of Bluff Creek, Buzzard Creek, Cavalry Creek, Kiowa Creek, East Kiowa Creek, Middle Kiowa Creek, West Kiowa Creek, Nichols Creek, Wiggins Creek and Willow Creek run through this township. The Cimarron River traverses the southwest corner of the township, coming in from the west and curving south into Oklahoma.

== Transportation ==
Protection is crossed by US Route 183, running concurrently with US Route 160 (east/west).

Protection Municipal Airport was just southwest of the town of Protection, but is no longer operational. Commercial air transportation is available out of Dodge City Regional Airport, about 58 miles to the northwest of town.
