= Coldwater Township, Kansas =

Coldwater Township
- Township
- Location in Comanche County
- Coordinates: 37°11′30″N 099°11′31″W
- Country: United States
- State: Kansas
- County: Comanche

Area
  - Total: 424.89 sq mi (1,100.45 km^{2})
  - Land: 424.18 sq mi (1,098.63 km^{2})
  - Water: 0.70 sq mi (1.82 km^{2}) 0.17%
- Elevation: 1,913 ft (583 m)

Population (2020)
  - Total: 920
  - Density: 2.2/sq mi (0.84/km^{2})
- ZIP Codes: 67029
- GNIS ID: 470843

Coldwater Township is a township in Comanche County, Kansas, United States. As of the 2020 census, its population was 920.

== Geography ==
Coldwater Township covers an area of 424.89 square miles (1,100.5 km^{2}) and contains one incorporated settlement, Coldwater (the county seat).
