= Henry Hertz =

Henry Hertz may refer to:

- Henry L. Hertz (1847–1926), American businessman and politician
- Henry Porter Hertz (1894–1944), American architect
