= Harold S. Herd =

American judge

Harold Herd

Member of the Kansas Senate from the 36th district
- In office 1965–1968

Member of the Kansas Senate from the 26th district
- In office 1969–1972
- Succeeded by: Jim Francisco

Personal details
- Born: June 3, 1918 Comanche County, Kansas, U.S.
- Died: April 23, 2007 Coldwater, Kansas
- Party: Democratic
- Spouse: Midge Herd
- Profession: Lawyer

Harold Shields Herd (June 3, 1918 – April 23, 2007) was a Kansas Supreme Court justice (1979–1993), minority leader in the Kansas State Senate (1969–1973), mayor of Coldwater, Kansas (1950–1954) and an officer in the U.S. Navy during World War II.

== Family and education ==
Herd was born in Comanche County, Kansas as the second child of J.J. Herd and Bernice Shields Herd.

Following graduation from Protection High School in 1936, Herd attended Southwestern College in Winfield, Kansas for two years lettering in football, track and debate. He subsequently transferred to Washburn University where he lettered in football and track. Herd received a BA degree in 1940 and a law degree in 1942. While at Washburn, he was a member of the Kansas Beta Chapter of Phi Delta Theta.

Herd was married for 67 years to Midge Herd. Together they had six children, 13 grandchildren, five great-grandchildren, plus 15 nieces and nephews. Herd's son, James H. "Skip" Herd, is currently the county attorney for Comanche County, Kansas, a post Herd held roughly fifty years before.

== Public service career ==
Following graduation from Washburn Law School, Herd joined the war effort, serving in the Pacific Theater as a naval officer on the USS Rio Grande and USS Cache. He left the navy as a lieutenant in 1946 and returned to his hometown to practice law. He was admitted to the bar that same year.

During the 1950s he served as mayor of Coldwater, Comanche County attorney, and then Coldwater City Attorney. In 1964, he ran for and won election to the Kansas State Senate as a Democrat and was Senate Minority Leader from 1969 to 1973. According to his obituary, "In all of these elected positions, he worked tirelessly in support of public education and the protection of individuals and their liberties from undue influence from the wealthy and powerful."

In March 1979, Governor John Carlin appointed Herd to the Kansas Supreme Court to replace retiring Justice Perry L. Owsley. Herd served on the court until 1993 helping interpret the law on a wide range of issues, including water rights, oil and gas, women's rights, and the separation of powers. Early in Herd's tenure on the Court, he voted to disbar Fred Phelps.

Upon retiring from the Kansas Supreme Court, Justice Herd became the first Distinguished Jurist in Residence at Washburn University School of Law, teaching constitutional history in that position until 2002, when he retired to his home in Coldwater.

== Tributes and civic activities ==
Herd was past president of Coldwater Lions Club, a member of the Coldwater First Presbyterian Church, and a Master Mason, Masonic Lodge #295. He served on the Washburn Law School board of governors, the Kansas Committee for the Humanities, the University of Kansas Hall Center for the Humanities, the executive council of the Kansas Bar Association, and as president of the Southwest Kansas Bar Association.

His honors included Who's Who in America, Who's Who in American Law, Who's Who in American Bench and Bar; Fellow in the American and Kansas Bar Foundations; Induction into Washburn's Sagamore Society in 1980, Distinguished Service Award by the Kansas Bar Association in 1991, a Distinguished Service Award from the Washburn Law School Association in 1995, and special recognition from Kansas high school teachers for his constant effort in helping students understand the constitution. The Harold S. Herd Law Scholarship at Washburn Law is named for him.
