= Kiowa Creek (Kansas) =

Location
- Country: United States

Physical characteristics
- Mouth: Cavalry Creek
  - location: Southeast of Protection, Kansas
  - coordinates: 37°10′45″N 99°28′06″W

Kiowa Creek is a stream in Comanche County, Kansas. Its watershed includes multiple other streams. West Kiowa Creek forms in northeast Clark County, Kansas, and flows generally southeast, passing through the southwestern corner of Kiowa County, Kansas, where it is joined by Turkey Creek and Little Turkey Creek. It continues into Comanche County, where it is joined by Middle Kiowa Creek, a southerly-flowing stream originating in Kiowa County to the north. The combined stream flows generally south, and becomes simply Kiowa Creek at some point. It is later joined by East Kiowa Creek, also a southerly-flowing stream originating in Kiowa County to the north, and one having its own tributary, Wiggins Creek. Kiowa Creek continues generally south, and travels along the eastern border of the town of Protection, Kansas, before becoming a tributary of Cavalry Creek to the southeast of Protection. Cavalry Creeks feeds into Bluff Creek, which eventually becomes a tributary of the Cimarron River before that watercourse enters Oklahoma.

This stream should not be confused with the Kiowa Creek in Oklahoma and Texas, nor the Kiowa Creek in Colorado, nor the Kiowa Creek in Nebraska, nor with similarly named creeks elsewhere.

== See also ==
- List of rivers of Kansas
