= Comanche County Courthouse (Kansas) =

- U.S. National Register of Historic Places
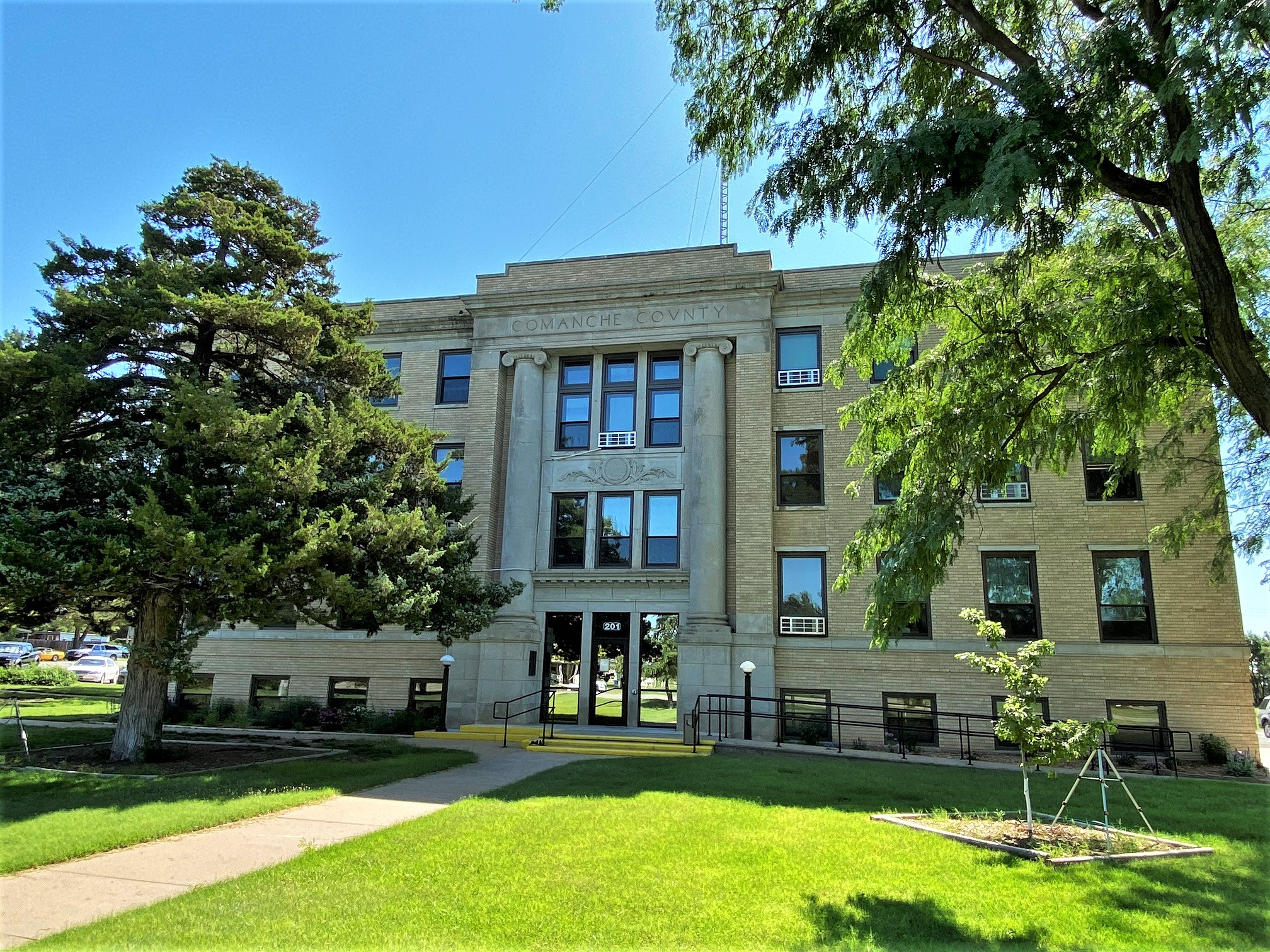
- The Comanche County Courthouse in 2021

- Location within Kansas Location within the United States
- Location: 201 S. New York Ave. Coldwater, Kansas
- Coordinates: 37°16′6″N 99°19′32″W
- Area: Less than one acre
- Built: 1927
- Architects: Routledge & Hertz; Howard, Thomas
- Architectural style: Classical Revival
- MPS: County Courthouses of Kansas MPS
- NRHP reference No.: 02000395
- Added to NRHP: April 26, 2002

The Comanche County Courthouse in Coldwater, Kansas, was built in 1927. It was listed on the National Register of Historic Places in 2002.

The building replaced a wood-frame courthouse from c. 1890 which was destroyed by a fire in 1921.

It is a four-story masonry building with buff brick and limestone trimmings. It was designed by Routledge & Hertz in Classical Revival style. It was built by contractor Thomas Howard.
