= Powell Township, Kansas =

Powell Township
- Township
- Location in Comanche County
- Coordinates: 37°20′38″N 099°04′29″W
- Country: United States
- State: Kansas
- County: Comanche

Area
  - Total: 71.88 sq mi (186.17 km^{2})
  - Land: 71.86 sq mi (186.12 km^{2})
  - Water: 0.023 sq mi (0.06 km^{2}) 0.03%
- Elevation: 1,998 ft (609 m)

Population (2020)
  - Total: 55
  - Density: 0.77/sq mi (0.30/km^{2})
- GNIS feature ID: 0470748

Powell Township is a township in Comanche County, Kansas, United States. At the 2020 census, its population was 55.

== Geography ==
Powell Township covers an area of 71.88 square miles (186.2 km^{2}) and contains one incorporated settlement, Wilmore. According to the USGS, it contains one cemetery, Powell Township.

The streams of Dunlap Creek, Jim Creek, Skelton Creek and Spring Creek run through this township.
