= Routledge & Hertz =

Architectural and engineering firm of Hutchinson, Kansas

Routledge & Hertz was an architectural and engineering firm of Hutchinson, Kansas which was organized in 1925 and operated through 1932.

It was a partnership of Chester M. Routledge and Henry Porter Hertz. The firm designed numerous public schools and six county courthouses in Kansas.

Henry Porter Hertz (1894–1944) was a partner. He obtained a B.S. degree in Architectural Engineering from Iowa State College in 1919. He left the partnership in 1933 to be employed by the City of Hutchinson. He served in the military from 1942 until his death in 1944, as Civilian Chief of the Buildings and Structures Section of the Seventh Service Command, Omaha, Nebraska.

Several of their works are listed on the National Register of Historic Places (NRHP).

Works include (with attribution):

- Sylvia Rural High School (1926), 203 Old KS 50, Sylvia, KS, (Routledge & Hertz), NRHP-listed
- Winona Consolidated School (1926), jct. of Wilson and 5th St., Winona, KS, (Routledge & Hertz), NRHP-listed
- Comanche County Courthouse (1927), Kansas
- Gray County Courthouse (1927), Kansas
- Edwards County Courthouse (1928–29), Kansas
- Finney County Courthouse (1928–29), Kansas
- Hodgeman County Courthouse (1929), 500 Main St., Jetmore, Kansas. An "eclectic interpretation" of Second Renaissance Revival style. (Routledge & Hertz), NRHP-listed
- Protection High School (1930), 210 S. Jefferson, Protection, KS, (Routledge & Hertz), NRHP-listed
- Longford High School (1929)
- Sherman County Courthouse (1931), Goodland, Kansas
