= Winona Consolidated School =

- U.S. National Register of Historic Places
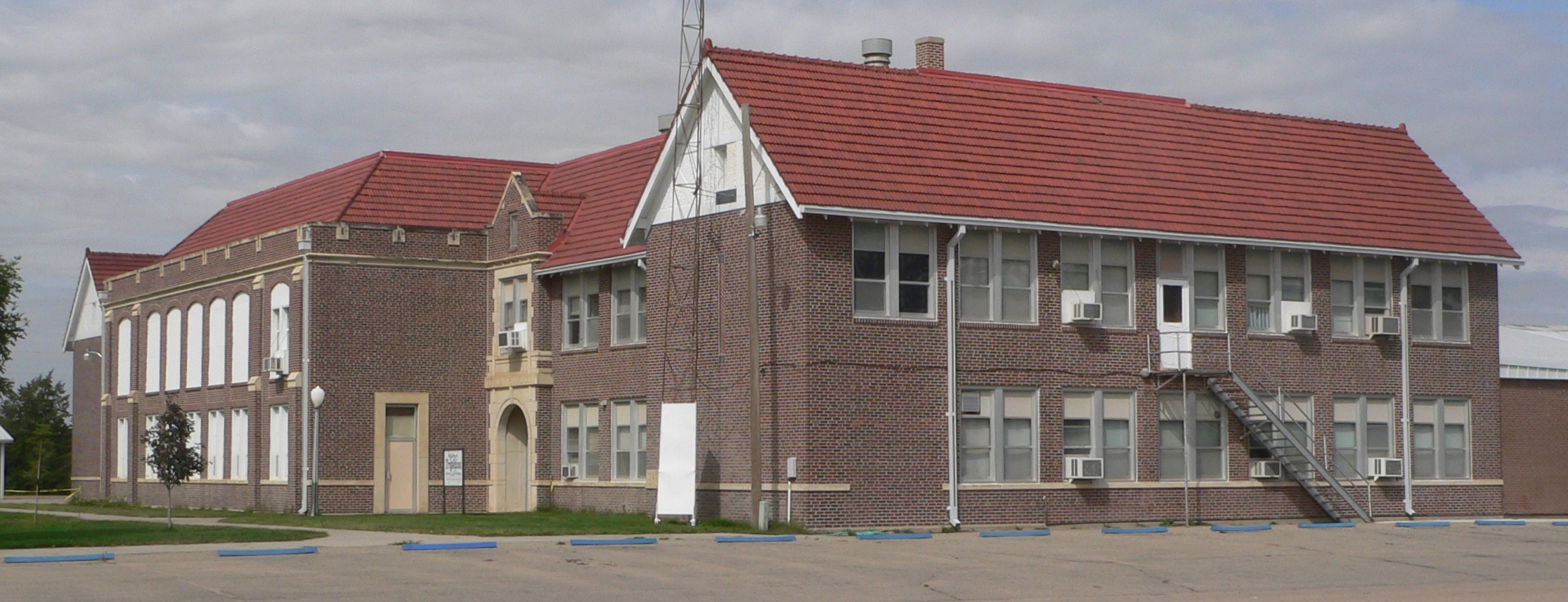

- Location within Kansas Location within the United States
- Location: Jct. of Wilson and 5th St., Winona, Kansas
- Coordinates: 39.06393°N 101.246025°W
- Area: 17 acres (6.9 ha)
- Built: 1926
- Built by: Corlett & Welchons
- Architect: Routledge & Hertz
- Architectural style: Tudor Revival, Late Gothic Revival
- MPS: Public Schools of Kansas MPS
- NRHP reference No.: 05000975
- Added to NRHP: September 6, 2005

The Winona Consolidated School, in Winona, Kansas at the corner of Wilson and 5th Streets, was built in 1926. It was listed on the National Register of Historic Places in 2005.

It was deemed significant "on a state and local level ... as the public school in Winona, an important component in the development and survival of the small rural community in western Kansas. The school is also significant ... as a representative of a Progressive Era educational structure. Although eclectic in design, reflecting a variety of Late 19th and 20th Century Revival stylistic influences, the Winona School embodies key characteristics emerging from the Progressive Era - building safety and standardization of curriculum. The school is a concrete and brick fire-proof structure, designed with safety in mind. The school had a separate auditorium and gymnasium, as well as classrooms designed for specific uses including domestic science, vocational agriculture, manual training, and art. The Winona School is also significant as an example of the work of Hutchinson architects Routledge and Hertz. Harry R. Routledge and Henry Potter Hertz partnered for only a short time, from 1925 - 1932; yet during that period, they were responsible for the design of no less than six county courthouses and numerous public schools in Kansas. Built to serve all grades, the Winona Consolidated School is representative of the Town Graded School property type and meets the registration requirements set forth in the multiple property documentation form."
