= Protection High School =

- U.S. National Register of Historic Places
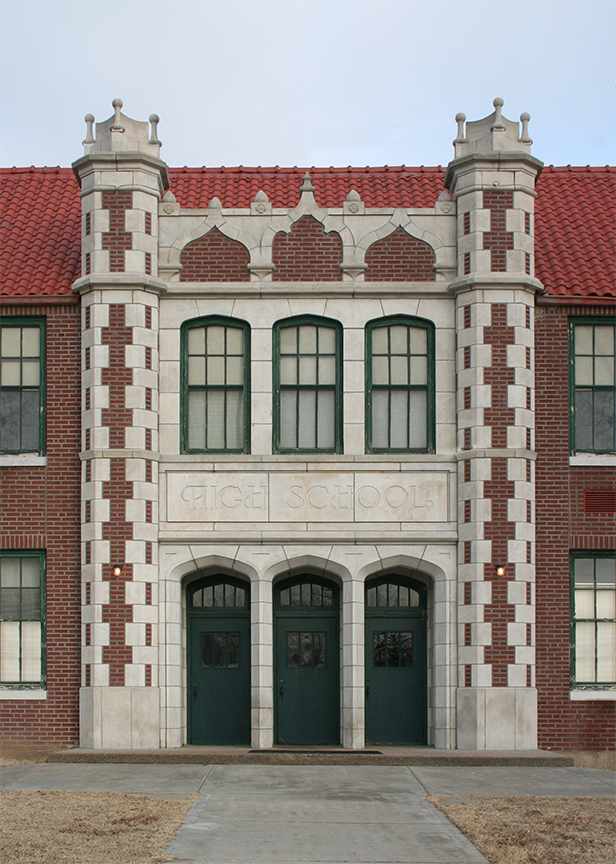

- Location within Kansas Location within the United States
- Location: 210 S. Jefferson, Protection, Kansas
- Coordinates: 37°11′53″N 99°28′50″W
- Area: 9.9 acres (4.0 ha)
- Built: 1930; 1950
- Architect: Routledge & Hertz; et al.
- Architectural style: Late Gothic Revival
- Website: www.usd300ks.com/scms
- MPS: Public Schools of Kansas MPS
- NRHP reference No.: 05001244
- Added to NRHP: November 15, 2005

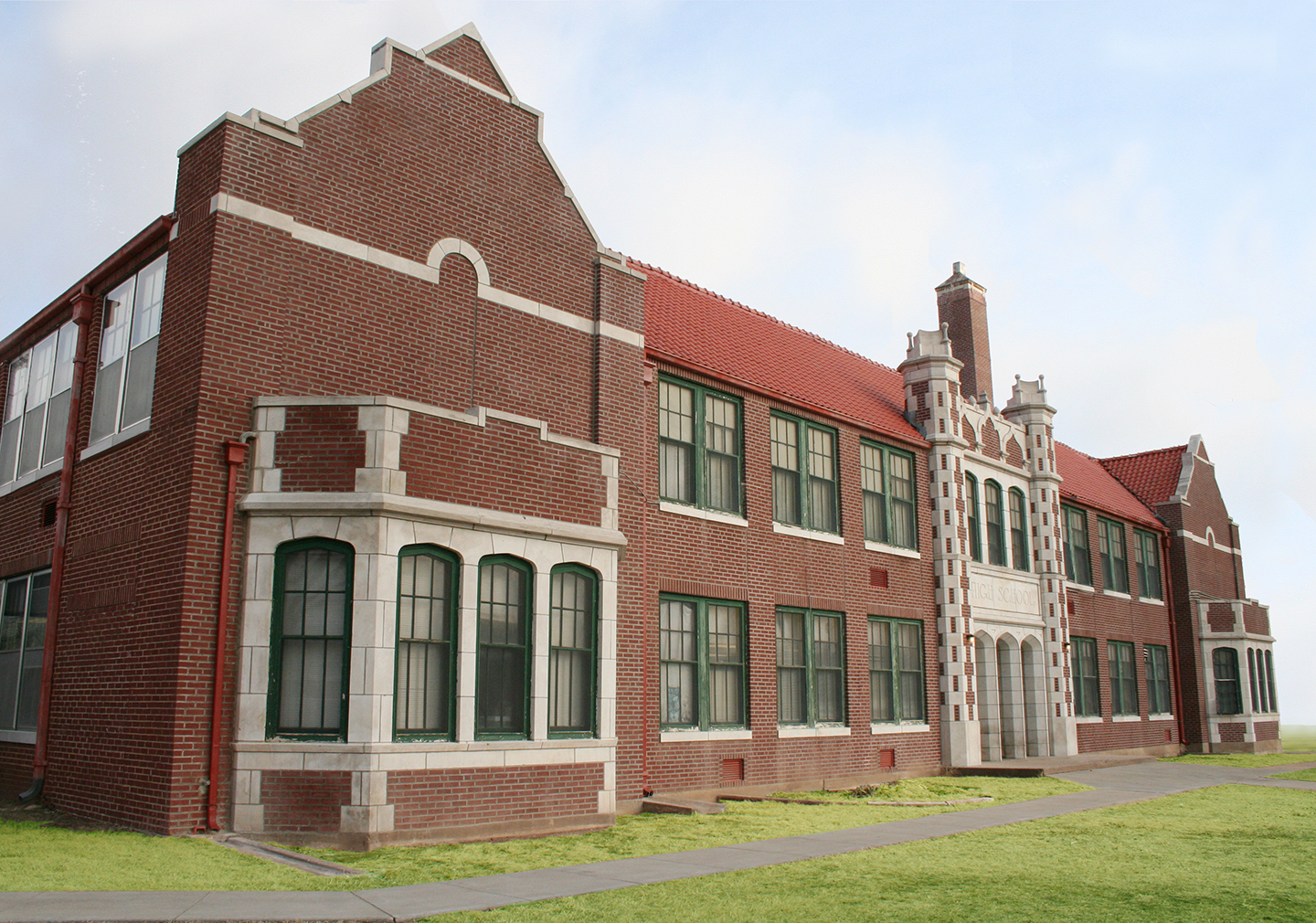
Protection High School (now South Central Middle School), looking southeast, 2007

The Protection High School, located at 210 S. Jefferson in Protection, Kansas, was built in 1930. It was designed by architects Routledge & Hertz in Late Gothic Revival style. An extension to add a grade school in 1950 was designed by Hibbs & Robinson. It has also been known as South Central Middle School and Elementary as the two schools operated by Comanche County USD 300 occupy the building. It was listed on the National Register of Historic Places in 2005.

It was deemed significant "as the public school in Protection, an important component in the development and survival of the small rural community in southwest Kansas", and also "as a representative of a Late Gothic Revival educational structure and work of Hutchinson architects Routledge and Hertz."
