= Kiowa Creek (Texas/Oklahoma) =

Location
- Country: United States

Physical characteristics
- Source
  - location: Southwest of Huntoon, Texas
- Mouth: Beaver River
  - location: North of Laverne, Oklahoma
  - coordinates: 36°45′34″N 99°54′20″W

Kiowa Creek is a watercourse in Texas and Oklahoma that becomes a tributary of the Beaver River. It originates southwest of Huntoon and east of Perryton in northeastern Ochiltree County, Texas. It travels generally east until southwest of Darrouzett in Lipscomb County then turns northeast and passes just south and east of that town. It continues generally northeasterly into Beaver County, Oklahoma, where it is joined by Camp Creek. The stream enters Harper County west of Laverne, Oklahoma, and continues to its joinder with the Beaver River north-northwest of Laverne.

This stream should not be confused with the Kiowa Creek in Colorado that is a tributary of the South Platte River, the Kiowa Creek in Kansas which eventually becomes a tributary of the Cimarron River, nor the Kiowa Creek in Nebraska.

== See also ==
- List of rivers of Texas
- List of rivers of Oklahoma
