= Hodgeman County Courthouse =

- U.S. National Register of Historic Places
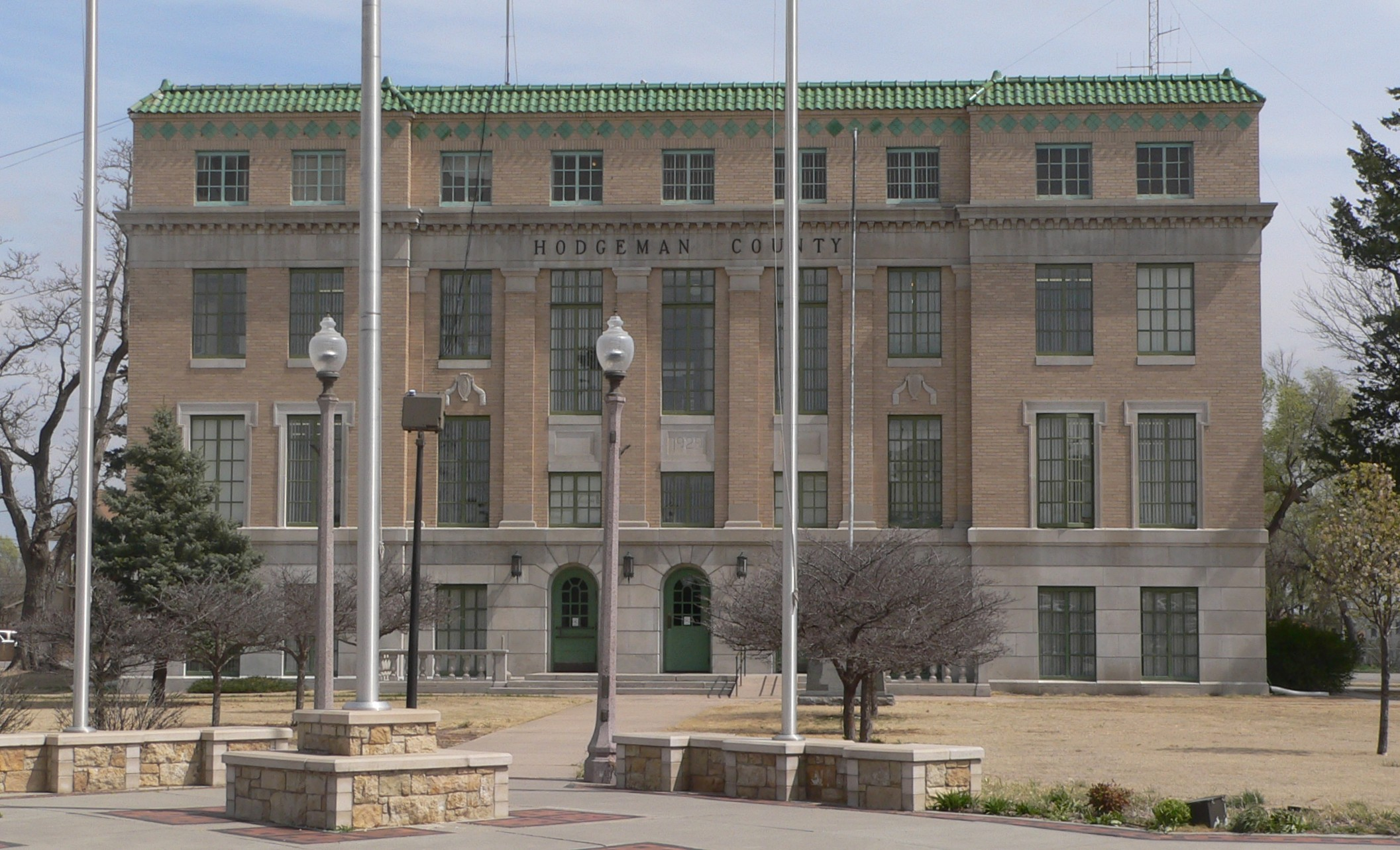

- Location within Kansas Location within the United States
- Location: 500 Main St., Jetmore, Kansas
- Coordinates: 38°5′3″N 99°53′33″W
- Area: 2.1 acres (0.85 ha)
- Built: 1929
- Architect: Routledge & Hertz
- Architectural style: Renaissance
- MPS: County Courthouses of Kansas MPS
- NRHP reference No.: 02000429
- Added to NRHP: May 2, 2002

The Hodgeman County Courthouse, at 500 Main St. in Jetmore, Kansas, was built in 1929. It was designed and built by Routledge & Hertz of Hutchinson, Kansas in an "eclectic interpretation" of Second Renaissance Revival style. It was listed on the National Register of Historic Places in 2002.

According to its 2001 NRHP nomination, it is the most prominent building in the town of Jetmore. It replaced an 1886 courthouse building on the same site.
