= Avilla Township, Kansas =

Avilla Township
- Township
- Location in Comanche County
- Coordinates: 37°05′00″N 099°20′01″W
- Country: United States
- State: Kansas
- County: Comanche

Area
  - Total: 119.37 sq mi (309.17 km^{2})
  - Land: 119.19 sq mi (308.71 km^{2})
  - Water: 0.18 sq mi (0.46 km^{2}) 0.15%
- Elevation: 1,942 ft (592 m)

Population (2020)
  - Total: 58
  - Density: 0.49/sq mi (0.19/km^{2})
- Time zone: UTC−6 (CST)
  - Summer (DST): UTC−5 (CDT)
- Area code: 620
- FIPS code: 20-03525
- GNIS ID: 470827

Avilla Township is a township in Comanche County, Kansas, United States. As of the 2020 census, its population was 58.

== Geography ==
Avilla Township covers an area of 119.37 square miles (309.2 km^{2}) and contains no incorporated settlements. According to the USGS, it contains one cemetery, Avilla.
