= Wilmore, Kansas =

City in Comanche County, Kansas

- City
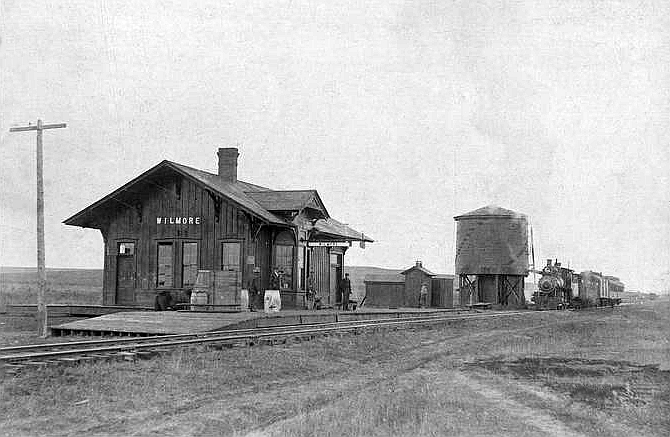
- Atchison, Topeka and Santa Fe Railway depot (1900)

- Location within Comanche County and Kansas

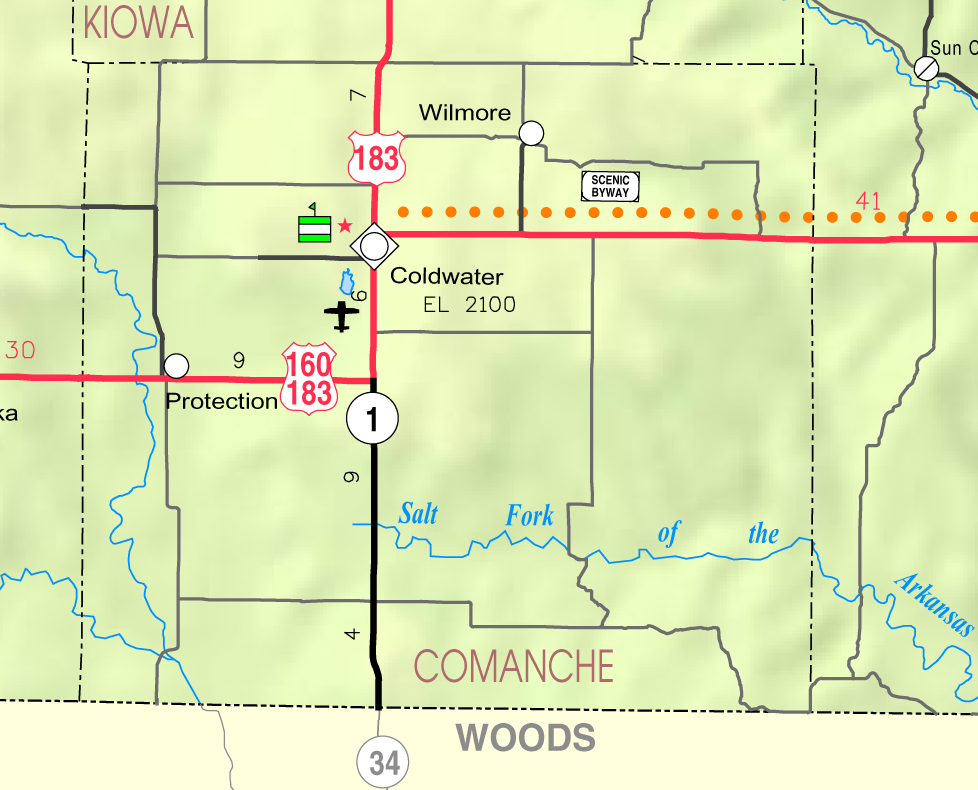
- KDOT map of Comanche County (legend)
- Coordinates: 37°20′06″N 99°12′37″W
- Country: United States
- State: Kansas
- County: Comanche
- Founded: 1887
- Incorporated: 1920
- Named for: Thomas Wilmore

Area
  - Total: 0.18 sq mi (0.46 km^{2})
  - Land: 0.18 sq mi (0.46 km^{2})
  - Water: 0 sq mi (0.00 km^{2})
- Elevation: 2,024 ft (617 m)

Population (2020)
  - Total: 37
  - Density: 210/sq mi (80/km^{2})
- Time zone: UTC-6 (CST)
  - Summer (DST): UTC-5 (CDT)
- ZIP Code: 67155
- Area code: 620
- FIPS code: 20-79550
- GNIS ID: 2397330

Wilmore is a city in Comanche County, Kansas, United States. As of the 2020 census, the population of the city was 37.

== History ==
Wilmore was founded in about 1887. It was named for Thomas Wilmore, the first merchant in town.

The first post office in Wilmore was established on June 7, 1887.

== Geography ==
According to the United States Census Bureau, the city has a total area of 0.20 square miles (0.52 km^{2}), all land.

=== Climate ===
The climate in this area is characterized by hot, humid summers and generally mild to cool winters. According to the Köppen Climate Classification system, Wilmore has a humid subtropical climate, abbreviated "Cfa" on climate maps.

== Demographics ==
Historical population
Census	Pop.	Note	%±
1930	265		—
1940	212		−20.0%
1950	172		−18.9%
1960	99		−42.4%
1970	96		−3.0%
1980	97		1.0%
1990	78		−19.6%
2000	57		−26.9%
2010	53		−7.0%
2020	37		−30.2%
U.S. Decennial Census

=== 2010 census ===
As of the census of 2010, there were 53 people, 27 households, and 19 families residing in the city. The population density was 265.0 inhabitants per square mile (102.3/km^{2}). There were 34 housing units at an average density of 170.0 per square mile (65.6/km^{2}). The racial makeup of the city was 100.0% White.

There were 27 households, of which 11.1% had children under the age of 18 living with them, 66.7% were married couples living together, 3.7% had a male householder with no wife present, and 29.6% were non-families. 25.9% of all households were made up of individuals, and 3.7% had someone living alone who was 65 years of age or older. The average household size was 1.96 and the average family size was 2.21.

The median age in the city was 54.4 years. 11.3% of residents were under the age of 18; 15.1% were between the ages of 18 and 24; 7.6% were from 25 to 44; 51% were from 45 to 64; and 15.1% were 65 years of age or older. The gender makeup of the city was 54.7% male and 45.3% female.

=== 2000 census ===
As of the census of 2000, there were 57 people, 30 households, and 20 families residing in the city. The population density was 279.4 inhabitants per square mile (107.9/km^{2}). There were 41 housing units at an average density of 201.0 per square mile (77.6/km^{2}). The racial makeup of the city was 100.00% White.

There were 30 households, out of which 16.7% had children under the age of 18 living with them, 60.0% were married couples living together, and 33.3% were non-families. 33.3% of all households were made up of individuals, and 16.7% had someone living alone who was 65 years of age or older. The average household size was 1.90 and the average family size was 2.35.

In the city, the population was spread out, with 14.0% under the age of 18, 14.0% from 25 to 44, 40.4% from 45 to 64, and 31.6% who were 65 years of age or older. The median age was 54 years. For every 100 females, there were 111.1 males. For every 100 females age 18 and over, there were 104.2 males.

The median income for a household in the city was $16,786, and the median income for a family was $28,125. Males had a median income of $21,875 versus $13,750 for females. The per capita income for the city was $12,820. There were 25.0% of families and 27.1% of the population living below the poverty line, including no under eighteens and 31.6% of those over 64.

== Education ==
The community is served by Comanche County USD 300 public school district.

Wilmore High School was closed through school unification. The Wilmore High School mascot was Tigers.

== Transportation ==
The Atchison, Topeka and Santa Fe Railway formerly provided passenger rail service to Wilmore on a line between Wichita and Englewood. Dedicated passenger service was provided until at least 1958, while mixed trains continued until at least 1961. As of 2025, the nearest passenger rail station is located in Dodge City, where Amtrak's Southwest Chief stops once daily on a route from Chicago to Los Angeles.
