= Englewood, Kansas =

City in Clark County, Kansas

- City
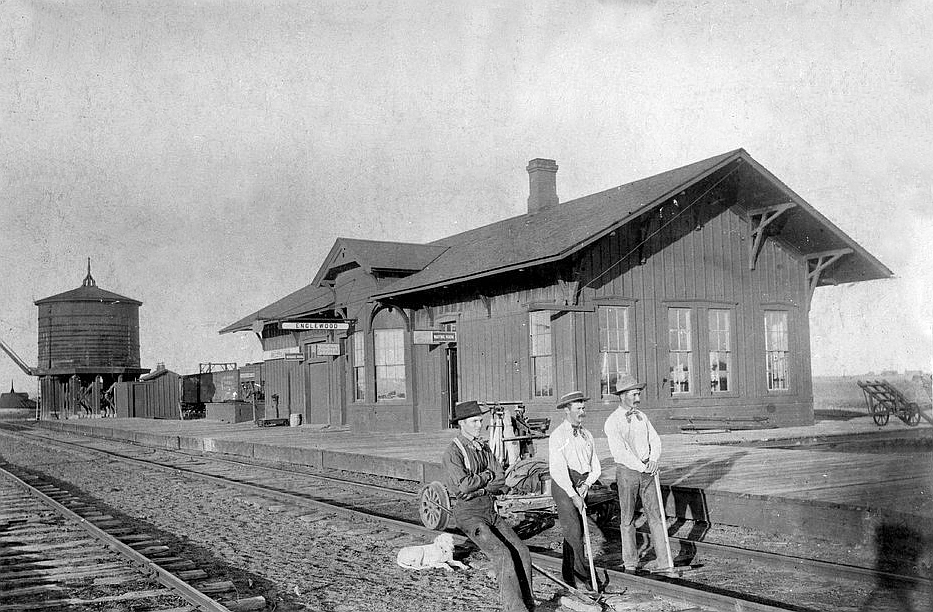
- Atchison, Topeka and Santa Fe Railway depot (1896)

- Location within Clark County and Kansas

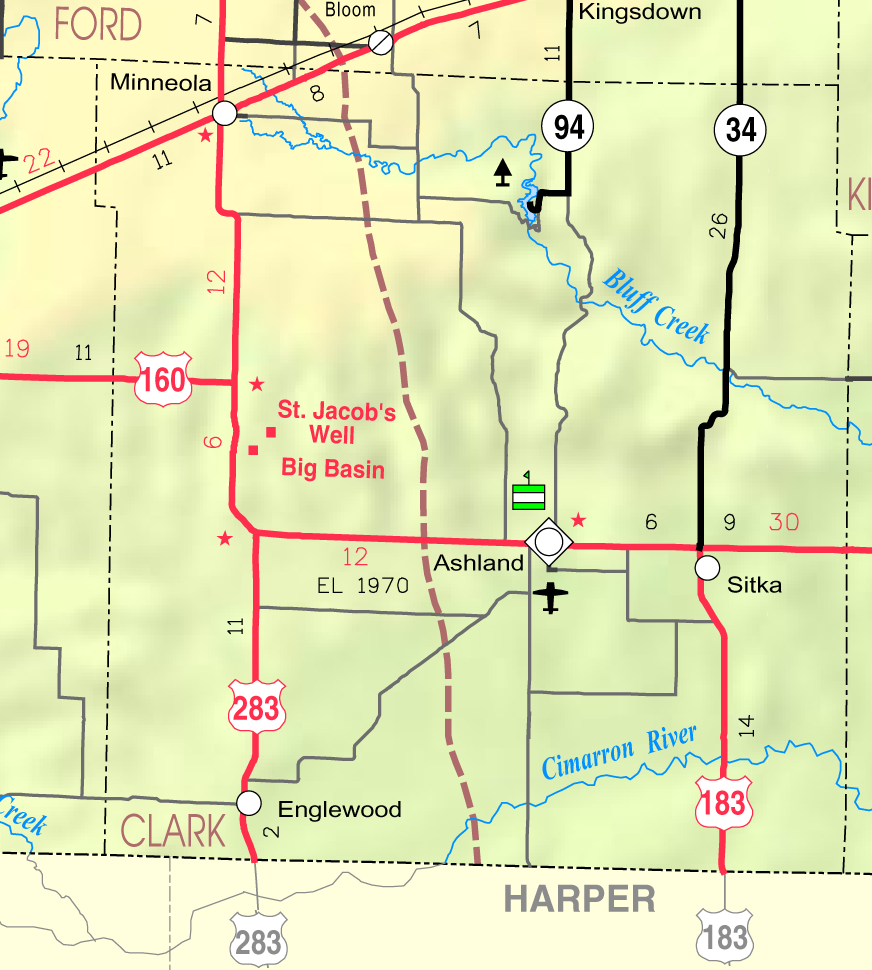
- KDOT map of Clark County (legend)
- Coordinates: 37°02′26″N 99°59′15″W
- Country: United States
- State: Kansas
- County: Clark
- Founded: 1884
- Incorporated: 1885
- Named for: Englewood, Illinois

Area
  - Total: 1.13 sq mi (2.92 km^{2})
  - Land: 1.13 sq mi (2.92 km^{2})
  - Water: 0 sq mi (0.00 km^{2})
- Elevation: 1,972 ft (601 m)

Population (2020)
  - Total: 58
  - Density: 51/sq mi (20/km^{2})
- Time zone: UTC-6 (CST)
  - Summer (DST): UTC-5 (CDT)
- ZIP Code: 67840
- Area code: 620
- FIPS code: 20-21350
- GNIS ID: 2394693
- Website: City website

Englewood is a city in Clark County, Kansas, United States. As of the 2020 census, the population of the city was 58.

== History ==
Englewood was founded in 1884 as a stop for cattle drives along the Texas Trail on the way to Dodge City. It was named after the Chicago neighbourhood of Englewood, Illinois. The first post office in Englewood was established in 1885. The Panic of 1893 caused failure of farms and the agricultural economy of the region, which did not recover until a local rancher donated land to the town in 1906. Two years later, much of the new business district was destroyed by fire.

In 2026, Englewood fell in the path of the Ranger Road Fire.

== Geography ==
According to the United States Census Bureau, the city has a total area of 1.01 square miles (2.62 km^{2}), all land.

== Demographics ==
Historical population
Census	Pop.	Note	%±
1890	175		—
1900	181		3.4%
1910	518		186.2%
1920	466		−10.0%
1930	477		2.4%
1940	377		−21.0%
1950	341		−9.5%
1960	243		−28.7%
1970	158		−35.0%
1980	111		−29.7%
1990	96		−13.5%
2000	109		13.5%
2010	77		−29.4%
2020	58		−24.7%
U.S. Decennial Census

=== 2020 census ===
The 2020 United States census counted 58 people, 28 households, and 20 families in Englewood. The population density was 51.4 per square mile (19.9/km^{2}). There were 55 housing units at an average density of 48.8 per square mile (18.8/km^{2}). The racial makeup was 86.21% (50) white or European American (84.48% non-Hispanic white), 0.0% (0) black or African-American, 5.17% (3) Native American or Alaska Native, 0.0% (0) Asian, 0.0% (0) Pacific Islander or Native Hawaiian, 0.0% (0) from other races, and 8.62% (5) from two or more races. Hispanic or Latino of any race was 3.45% (2) of the population.

Of the 28 households, 25.0% had children under the age of 18; 53.6% were married couples living together; 28.6% had a female householder with no spouse or partner present. 25.0% of households consisted of individuals and 14.3% had someone living alone who was 65 years of age or older. The average household size was 2.0 and the average family size was 2.3. The percent of those with a bachelor's degree or higher was estimated to be 0.0% of the population.

12.1% of the population was under the age of 18, 6.9% from 18 to 24, 12.1% from 25 to 44, 29.3% from 45 to 64, and 39.7% who were 65 years of age or older. The median age was 64.0 years. For every 100 females, there were 87.1 males. For every 100 females ages 18 and older, there were 88.9 males.

The 2016–2020 5-year American Community Survey estimates show that the median household income was $45,417 (with a margin of error of +/- $37,302) and the median family income was $47,083 (+/- $36,656). Males had a median income of $46,607 (+/- $2,285) versus $8,958 (+/- $4,633) for females. Approximately, 27.3% of families and 21.6% of the population were below the poverty line, including 0.0% of those under the age of 18 and 29.4% of those ages 65 or over.

=== 2010 census ===
As of the census of 2010, there were 77 people, 40 households, and 20 families residing in the city. The population density was 76.2 inhabitants per square mile (29.4/km^{2}). There were 68 housing units at an average density of 67.3 per square mile (26.0/km^{2}). The racial makeup of the city was 88.3% White, 1.3% Asian, and 10.4% from other races. Hispanic or Latino of any race were 10.4% of the population.

There were 40 households, of which 15.0% had children under the age of 18 living with them, 45.0% were married couples living together, 2.5% had a female householder with no husband present, 2.5% had a male householder with no wife present, and 50.0% were non-families. 45.0% of all households were made up of individuals, and 22.5% had someone living alone who was 65 years of age or older. The average household size was 1.93 and the average family size was 2.75.

The median age in the city was 53.5 years. 19.5% of residents were under the age of 18; 0.0% were between the ages of 18 and 24; 11.7% were from 25 to 44; 36.4% were from 45 to 64; and 32.5% were 65 years of age or older. The gender makeup of the city was 59.7% male and 40.3% female.

== Education ==
The community is served by Ashland USD 220 public school district.

Englewood High School was closed through school unification. The Englewood High School mascot was Bulldogs.

== Transportation ==
The Atchison, Topeka and Santa Fe Railway formerly provided passenger rail service to Englewood, which served as a terminus for a line from Wichita. Dedicated passenger service was provided until at least 1958, while mixed trains continued until at least 1961. As of 2025, the nearest passenger rail station is located in Dodge City, where Amtrak's Southwest Chief stops once daily on a route from Chicago to Los Angeles.
