= Protection, Kansas =

City in Comanche County, Kansas

- City
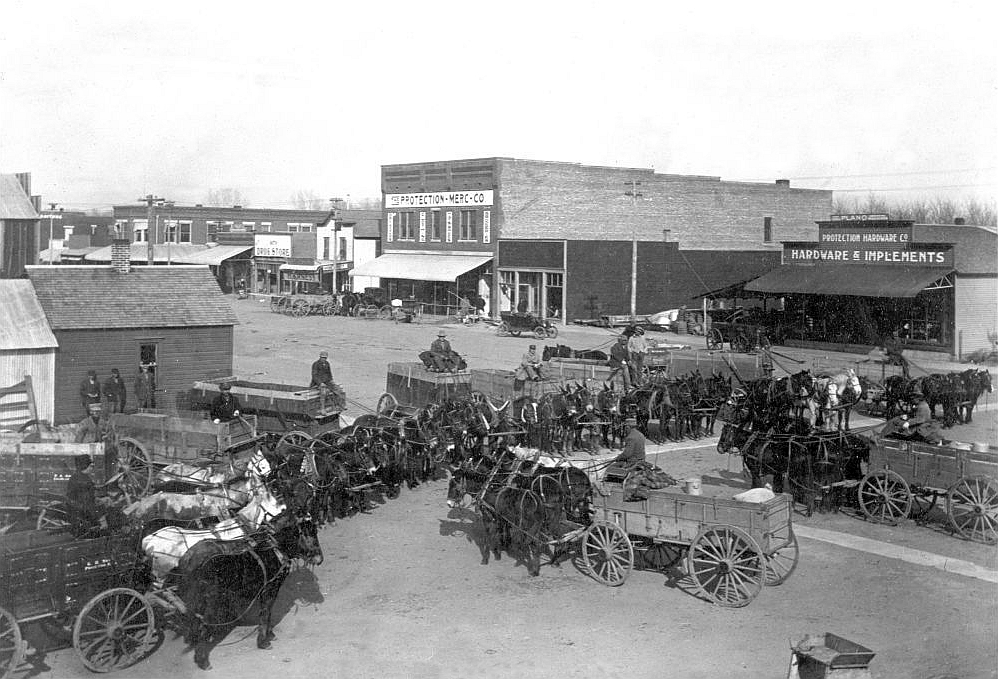
- Wheat wagons on Broadway Avenue (1913)

- Location within Comanche County and Kansas

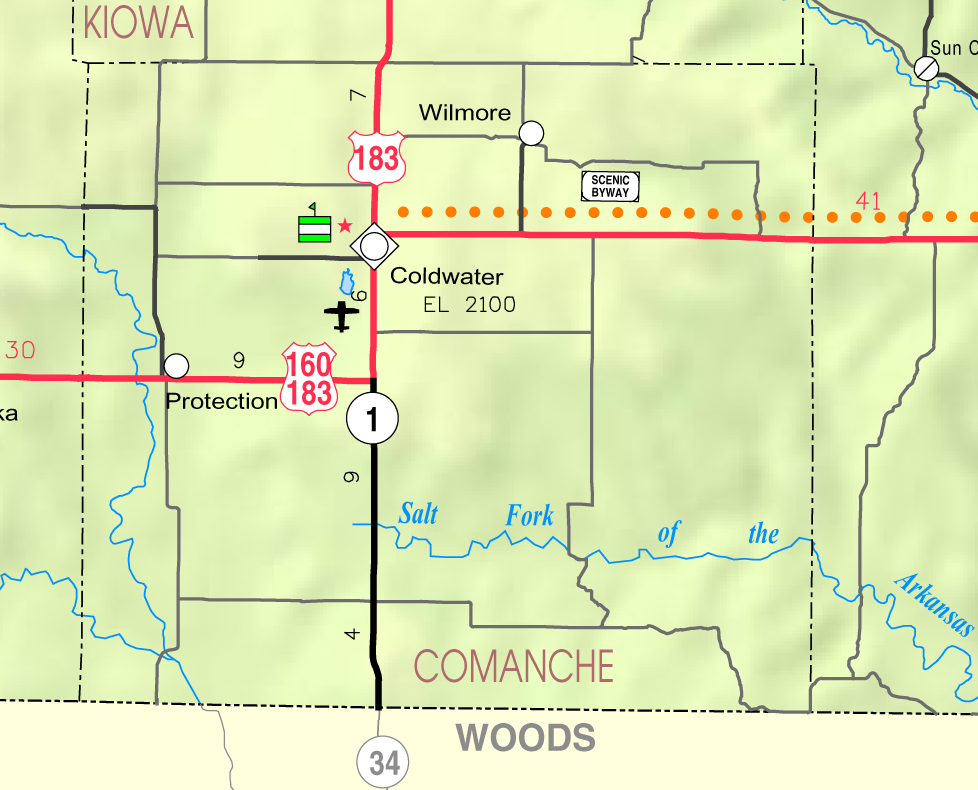
- KDOT map of Comanche County (legend)
- Coordinates: 37°12′01″N 99°28′51″W
- Country: United States
- State: Kansas
- County: Comanche
- Founded: 1884
- Incorporated: 1908
- Named for: protective tariff

Area
  - Total: 0.93 sq mi (2.40 km^{2})
  - Land: 0.93 sq mi (2.40 km^{2})
  - Water: 0 sq mi (0.00 km^{2})
- Elevation: 1,847 ft (563 m)

Population (2020)
  - Total: 498
  - Density: 537/sq mi (208/km^{2})
- Time zone: UTC-6 (CST)
  - Summer (DST): UTC-5 (CDT)
- ZIP Code: 67127
- Area code: 620
- FIPS code: 20-57850
- GNIS ID: 2396289

Protection is a city in Comanche County, Kansas, United States. As of the 2020 census, the population of the city was 498.

== History ==
Protection was founded in 1884. Popular support for a protective tariff in the 1884 presidential election caused the name to be selected. The first post office in Protection was established on August 27, 1884.

The town became nationally and internationally known via radio and television in 1957, when the National Polio Foundation chose it as the center for the free distribution of Salk vaccine shots for polio. It then became 100 percent protected.

== Geography ==
According to the United States Census Bureau, the city has a total area of 0.95 square miles (2.46 km^{2}), all land.

== Demographics ==
Historical population
Census	Pop.	Note	%±
1910	390		—
1920	1,109		184.4%
1930	1,072		−3.3%
1940	846		−21.1%
1950	814		−3.8%
1960	750		−7.9%
1970	673		−10.3%
1980	684		1.6%
1990	625		−8.6%
2000	558		−10.7%
2010	514		−7.9%
2020	498		−3.1%
U.S. Decennial Census

=== 2020 census ===
The 2020 United States census counted 498 people, 205 households, and 131 families in Protection. The population density was 537.2 per square mile (207.4/km^{2}). There were 243 housing units at an average density of 262.1 per square mile (101.2/km^{2}). The racial makeup was 92.37% (460) white or European American (88.55% non-Hispanic white), 1.2% (6) black or African-American, 0.2% (1) Native American or Alaska Native, 0.0% (0) Asian, 0.0% (0) Pacific Islander or Native Hawaiian, 2.61% (13) from other races, and 3.61% (18) from two or more races. Hispanic or Latino of any race was 7.63% (38) of the population.

Of the 205 households, 28.8% had children under the age of 18; 53.2% were married couples living together; 24.9% had a female householder with no spouse or partner present. 33.7% of households consisted of individuals and 19.0% had someone living alone who was 65 years of age or older. The average household size was 1.8 and the average family size was 2.3. The percent of those with a bachelor's degree or higher was estimated to be 10.2% of the population.

23.3% of the population was under the age of 18, 5.4% from 18 to 24, 19.9% from 25 to 44, 24.9% from 45 to 64, and 26.5% who were 65 years of age or older. The median age was 46.7 years. For every 100 females, there were 101.6 males. For every 100 females ages 18 and older, there were 105.4 males.

The 2016–2020 5-year American Community Survey estimates show that the median household income was $53,281 (with a margin of error of +/- $16,918) and the median family income was $68,462 (+/- $7,274). Males had a median income of $40,441 (+/- $6,591). The median income for those above 16 years old was $35,625 (+/- $12,218). Approximately, 6.6% of families and 13.8% of the population were below the poverty line, including 21.6% of those under the age of 18 and 20.3% of those ages 65 or over.

=== 2010 census ===
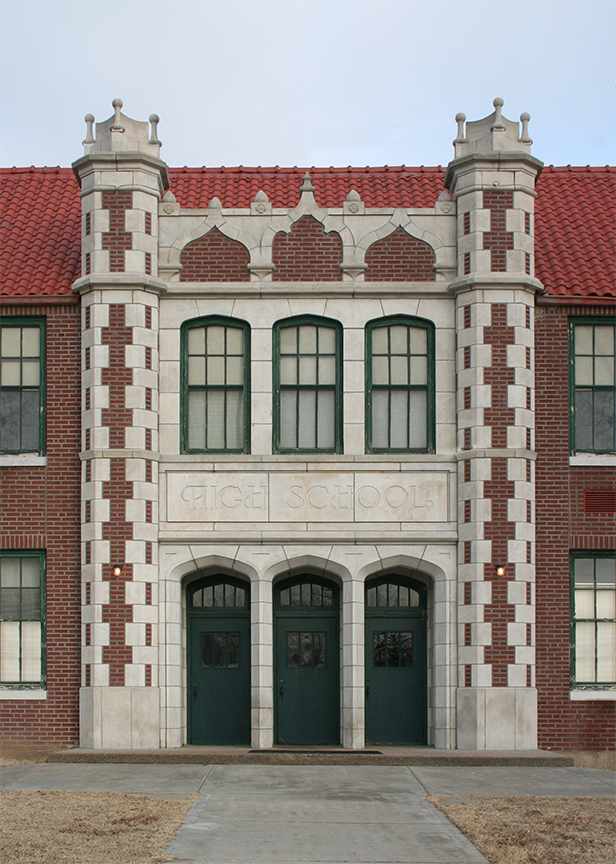
The former Protection High School is one of the buildings of South Central Elementary School/South Central Middle School

As of the census of 2010, there were 514 people, 215 households, and 131 families residing in the city. The population density was 541.1 inhabitants per square mile (208.9/km^{2}). There were 277 housing units at an average density of 291.6 per square mile (112.6/km^{2}). The racial makeup of the city was 95.3% White, 0.4% Native American, 0.6% Asian, 2.5% from other races, and 1.2% from two or more races. Hispanic or Latino of any race were 5.1% of the population.

There were 215 households, of which 25.6% had children under the age of 18 living with them, 54.0% were married couples living together, 4.7% had a female householder with no husband present, 2.3% had a male householder with no wife present, and 39.1% were non-families. 36.3% of all households were made up of individuals, and 20.5% had someone living alone who was 65 years of age or older. The average household size was 2.20 and the average family size was 2.86.

The median age in the city was 46.6 years. 21.6% of residents were under the age of 18; 3.5% were between the ages of 18 and 24; 22.1% were from 25 to 44; 25.1% were from 45 to 64; and 27.6% were 65 years of age or older. The gender makeup of the city was 48.4% male and 51.6% female.

== Education ==
The community is served by Comanche County USD 300 public school district. South Central Elementary and South Central Middle School are in Protection, with the former Protection High School building on campus, while South Central High School is in Coldwater. The South Central High School mascot is Timberwolves.

Prior to school unification, the Protection Panthers won the Kansas State High School 1A football championship in 1978 and the 8-Man DII football championship in 1983.

== Transportation ==
The Atchison, Topeka and Santa Fe Railway formerly provided passenger rail service to Protection on a line between Wichita and Englewood. Dedicated passenger service was provided until at least 1958, while mixed trains continued until at least 1961.

== Notable people ==
- Stan Herd, crop artist
- Nathan Leeper, Olympic high jumper
