= Comanche County USD 300 =

Public school district in Coldwater, Kansas

Address
- 600 E. Garfield St. Coldwater, Kansas, 67029; United States
- Coordinates: 37.2758°N 99.3206°W

District information
- Type: Public
- Grades: K to 12
- Accreditation(s): KSHSAA
- Schools: 2

Other information
- Website: usd300ks.com

Comanche County USD 300, previously known as South Central USD 300, is a public unified school district headquartered in Coldwater, Kansas, United States. The district includes the communities of Coldwater, Protection, Wilmore, Buttermilk, and nearby rural areas.

== Schools ==
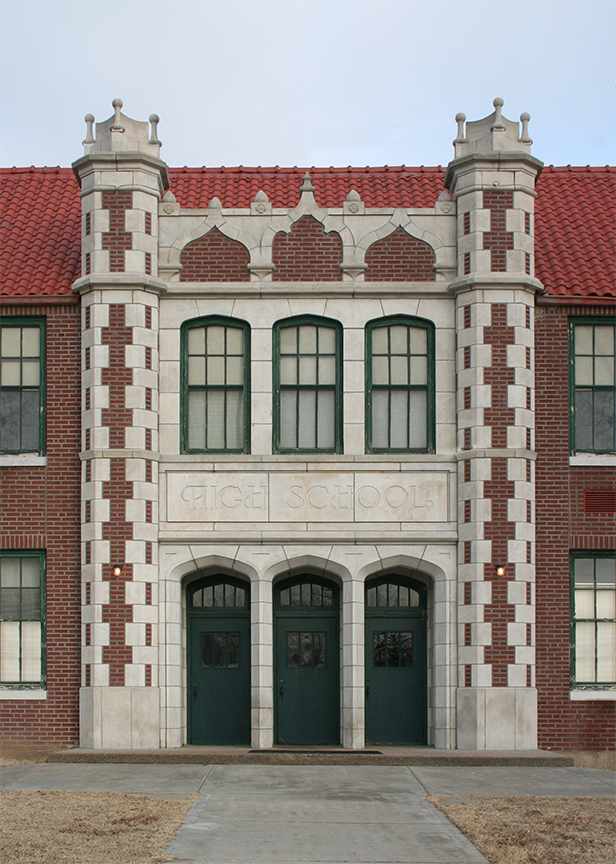
The former Protection High School is one of the buildings of South Central Elementary School/South Central Middle School

The school district operates the following schools:

- South Central High School in Coldwater. It also serves as the district headquarters.
- South Central Middle School and South Central Elementary School in Protection. The former Protection High School is one of the campus buildings.

== History ==
In 1999, Wilmore, Protection, Coldwater consolidated into South Central USD 300.

Prior to 2013 the school issued full laptops for students to use, but that year it began issuing Chromebooks instead.

=== High school ===
In the fall students may pick cross country, tennis, in the high school also football, and volleyball. In the winter high school students play basketball, girls may join cheerleading teams. Spring sports include track and golf.

== See also ==
- Kansas State Department of Education
- Kansas State High School Activities Association
- List of high schools in Kansas
- List of unified school districts in Kansas
