= Comanche County, Kansas =

County in Kansas, United States

- County
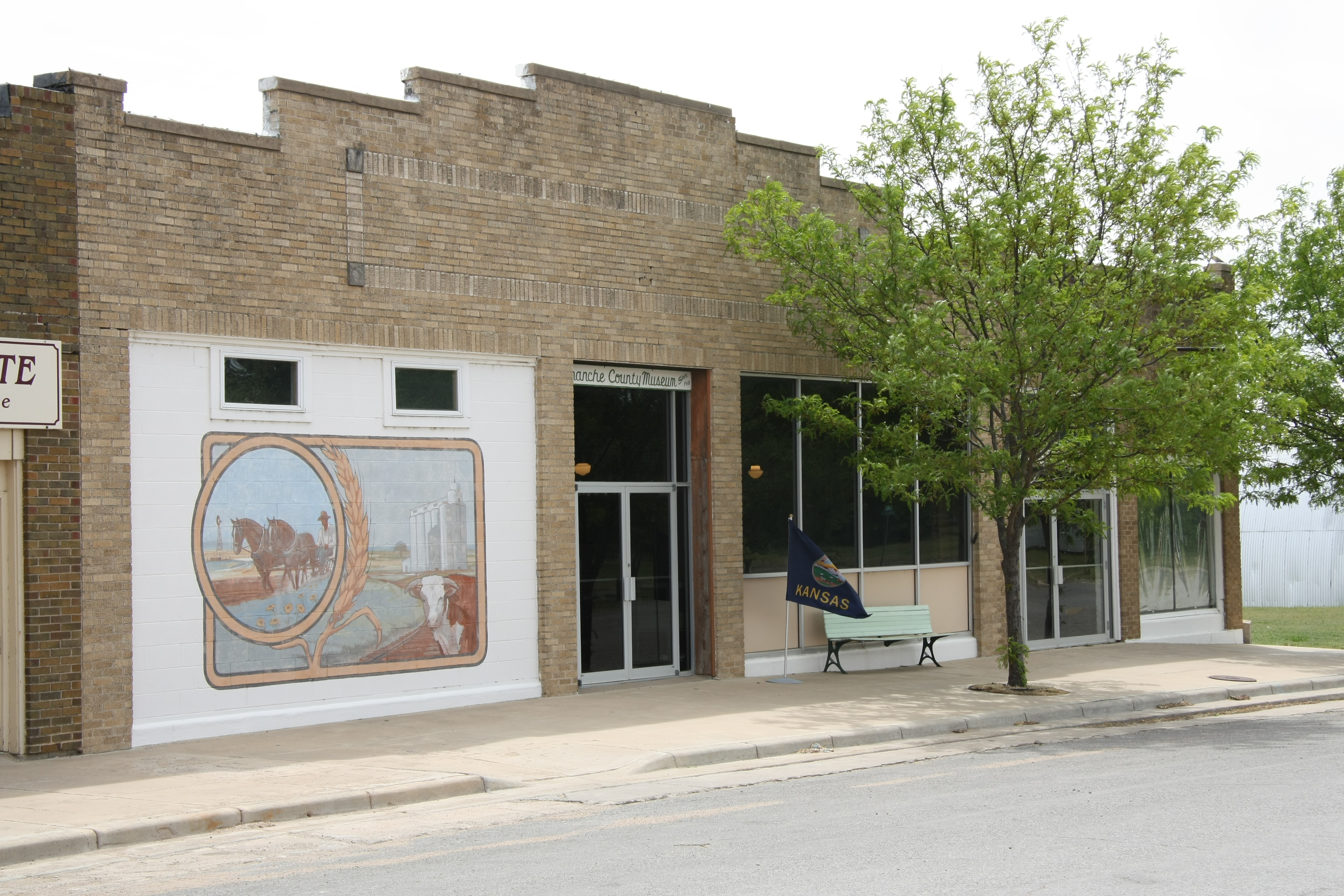
- Comanche County Museum in Coldwater (2010)

- Location within the U.S. state of Kansas
- Coordinates: 37°11′N 99°16′W
- Country: United States
- State: Kansas
- Founded: February 26, 1867
- Named for: Comanche Native Americans
- Seat: Coldwater
- Largest city: Coldwater

Area
  - Total: 790 sq mi (2,000 km^{2})
  - Land: 788 sq mi (2,040 km^{2})
  - Water: 1.4 sq mi (3.6 km^{2}) 0.2%

Population (2020)
  - Total: 1,689
  - Estimate (2025): 1,673 ▼
  - Density: 2.1/sq mi (0.81/km^{2})
- Time zone: UTC−6 (Central)
  - Summer (DST): UTC−5 (CDT)
- Area code: 620
- Congressional district: 4th
- Website: comanchecoks.org

Comanche County is a county located in the U.S. state of Kansas. Its county seat and most populous city is Coldwater. As of the 2020 census, the county population was 1,689. The county was named after the Comanche tribe.

== History ==
In 1867, Comanche County was established and named for the Comanche tribe. The first American settlers arrived in 1873. Initially, the land was dominated by cattlemen who took advantage of the open range, many of whom organized a cattle company known as the "Comanche Pool." A large number of homesteaders arrived to claim and farm the land in 1884, and by 1885 most of the desirable homesteads had been claimed and the fencing in of the open range had ended the dominance of the cattlemen.

The town of Coldwater was founded in 1884 by a group from Harper, Kansas, who saw potential in the northern part of Comanche County. The county organized in 1885 with Coldwater serving as the county seat. The arrival of the Atchison, Topeka & Santa Fe Railroad in 1887 boosted prosperity population growth by improving transportation in the county. The opening of the Indian Territory to homesteading led to a temporary depopulation, however, and the dry years from 1891 to 1897 brought economic hardship, reducing the population significantly. The first decades of the 20th century brought economic and population recovery, but the Dust Bowl of the 1930s and subsequent rural flight in the 20th and 21st centuries have significantly impacted the county's fortunes.

== Geography ==
According to the United States Census Bureau, the county has a total area of 790 square miles (2,000 km^{2}), of which 788 square miles (2,040 km^{2}) is land and 1.4 square miles (3.6 km^{2}) (0.2%) is water.

=== Adjacent counties ===
- Kiowa County (north)
- Barber County (east)
- Woods County, Oklahoma (south)
- Harper County, Oklahoma (southwest)
- Clark County (west)

== Demographics ==
Historical population
Census	Pop.	Note	%±
1880	372		—
1890	2,549		585.2%
1900	1,619		−36.5%
1910	3,281		102.7%
1920	5,302		61.6%
1930	5,238		−1.2%
1940	4,412		−15.8%
1950	3,888		−11.9%
1960	3,271		−15.9%
1970	2,702		−17.4%
1980	2,554		−5.5%
1990	2,313		−9.4%
2000	1,967		−15.0%
2010	1,891		−3.9%
2020	1,689		−10.7%
2025 (est.)	1,673	▼	−0.9%
U.S. Decennial Census; 1790–1960 1900–1990; 1990–2000 2010–2020

=== Racial and ethnic composition ===
Comanche County, Kansas – Racial and ethnic composition Note: the US Census treats Hispanic/Latino as an ethnic category. This table excludes Latinos from the racial categories and assigns them to a separate category. Hispanics/Latinos may be of any race.
Race / Ethnicity (NH = Non-Hispanic)	Pop 1980	Pop 1990	Pop 2000	Pop 2010	Pop 2020	% 1980	% 1990	% 2000	% 2010	% 2020
White alone (NH)	2,537	2,283	1,906	1,783	1,520	99.33%	98.70%	96.90%	94.29%	89.99%
Black or African American alone (NH)	1	6	1	6	10	0.04%	0.26%	0.05%	0.32%	0.59%
Native American or Alaska Native alone (NH)	2	11	5	2	2	0.08%	0.48%	0.25%	0.11%	0.12%
Asian alone (NH)	0	0	1	5	0	0.00%	0.00%	0.05%	0.26%	0.00%
Native Hawaiian or Pacific Islander alone (NH)	x	x	3	1	1	x	x	0.15%	0.05%	0.06%
Other race alone (NH)	3	0	0	0	3	0.12%	0.00%	0.00%	0.00%	0.18%
Mixed race or Multiracial (NH)	x	x	16	21	55	x	x	0.81%	1.11%	3.26%
Hispanic or Latino (any race)	11	13	35	73	98	0.43%	0.56%	1.78%	3.86%	5.80%
Total	2,554	2,313	1,967	1,891	1,689	100.00%	100.00%	100.00%	100.00%	100.00%

=== 2020 census ===
As of the 2020 census, the county had a population of 1,689. The median age was 46.0 years. 23.4% of residents were under the age of 18 and 25.5% of residents were 65 years of age or older. For every 100 females there were 97.1 males, and for every 100 females age 18 and over there were 93.9 males age 18 and over. 0.0% of residents lived in urban areas, while 100.0% lived in rural areas.

The racial makeup of the county was 92.4% White, 0.7% Black or African American, 0.1% American Indian and Alaska Native, 0.0% Asian, 0.1% Native Hawaiian and Pacific Islander, 1.4% from some other race, and 5.3% from two or more races. Hispanic or Latino residents of any race comprised 5.8% of the population.

There were 747 households in the county, of which 27.6% had children under the age of 18 living with them and 26.9% had a female householder with no spouse or partner present. About 35.8% of all households were made up of individuals and 20.2% had someone living alone who was 65 years of age or older.

There were 938 housing units, of which 20.4% were vacant. Among occupied housing units, 78.6% were owner-occupied and 21.4% were renter-occupied. The homeowner vacancy rate was 2.6% and the rental vacancy rate was 14.4%.

=== 2000 census ===
As of the census of 2000, there were 1,967 people, 872 households, and 540 families residing in the county. The population density was 2 people per square mile (0.77 people/km^{2}). There were 1,088 housing units at an average density of 1 per square mile (0.39/km^{2}). The racial makeup of the county was 97.97% White, 0.05% Black or African American, 0.25% Native American, 0.05% Asian, 0.20% Pacific Islander, 0.61% from other races, and 0.86% from two or more races. Hispanic or Latino of any race were 1.78% of the population.

There were 872 households, out of which 24.40% had children under the age of 18 living with them, 54.40% were married couples living together, 6.20% had a female householder with no husband present, and 38.00% were non-families. Of all households 35.90% were made up of individuals, and 21.20% had someone living alone who was 65 years of age or older. The average household size was 2.18 and the average family size was 2.81.

In the county, the population was spread out, with 22.10% under the age of 18, 4.50% from 18 to 24, 21.00% from 25 to 44, 26.50% from 45 to 64, and 25.80% who were 65 years of age or older. The median age was 47 years. For every 100 females there were 93.60 males. For every 100 females age 18 and over, there were 87.50 males.

The median income for a household in the county was $29,415, and the median income for a family was $36,790. Males had a median income of $24,844 versus $18,221 for females. The per capita income for the county was $17,037. About 8.50% of families and 10.20% of the population were below the poverty line, including 9.70% of those under age 18 and 7.70% of those age 65 or over.

== Government ==
=== Presidential elections ===
Presidential election results

United States presidential election results for Comanche County, Kansas
Year	Republican		Democratic		Third party(ies)	
Year	No.	%	No.	%	No.	%
1888	490	50.67%	384	39.71%	93	9.62%
1892	259	45.52%	0	0.00%	310	54.48%
1896	142	44.94%	172	54.43%	2	0.63%
1900	249	54.85%	194	42.73%	11	2.42%
1904	272	63.40%	129	30.07%	28	6.53%
1908	392	59.67%	245	37.29%	20	3.04%
1912	148	13.05%	377	33.25%	609	53.70%
1916	732	38.55%	963	50.71%	204	10.74%
1920	1,121	63.05%	612	34.42%	45	2.53%
1924	1,049	60.25%	432	24.81%	260	14.93%
1928	1,554	79.98%	385	19.81%	4	0.21%
1932	945	43.91%	1,175	54.60%	32	1.49%
1936	932	39.44%	1,428	60.43%	3	0.13%
1940	1,322	59.50%	880	39.60%	20	0.90%
1944	1,048	61.47%	642	37.65%	15	0.88%
1948	1,077	61.90%	650	37.36%	13	0.75%
1952	1,443	78.98%	374	20.47%	10	0.55%
1956	1,238	72.40%	461	26.96%	11	0.64%
1960	1,187	71.85%	460	27.85%	5	0.30%
1964	694	45.54%	818	53.67%	12	0.79%
1968	906	62.66%	451	31.19%	89	6.15%
1972	1,052	77.18%	281	20.62%	30	2.20%
1976	719	52.71%	630	46.19%	15	1.10%
1980	877	65.45%	393	29.33%	70	5.22%
1984	993	76.80%	285	22.04%	15	1.16%
1988	738	65.72%	375	33.39%	10	0.89%
1992	636	49.49%	325	25.29%	324	25.21%
1996	691	61.31%	298	26.44%	138	12.24%
2000	760	75.55%	211	20.97%	35	3.48%
2004	770	78.49%	200	20.39%	11	1.12%
2008	765	78.54%	194	19.92%	15	1.54%
2012	767	82.65%	143	15.41%	18	1.94%
2016	715	82.47%	102	11.76%	50	5.77%
2020	762	83.19%	126	13.76%	28	3.06%
2024	727	83.18%	130	14.87%	17	1.95%

=== Laws ===
The Kansas Constitution was amended in 1986 to allow the sale of alcoholic liquor by the individual drink with the approval of voters, either with or without a minimum of 30% of sales coming from food. Comanche County is one of 35 counties in the state that allows for the sale of liquor by the drink without the minimum food sales stipulation.

== Education ==
=== Unified school districts ===
- Comanche County USD 300

== Communities ==
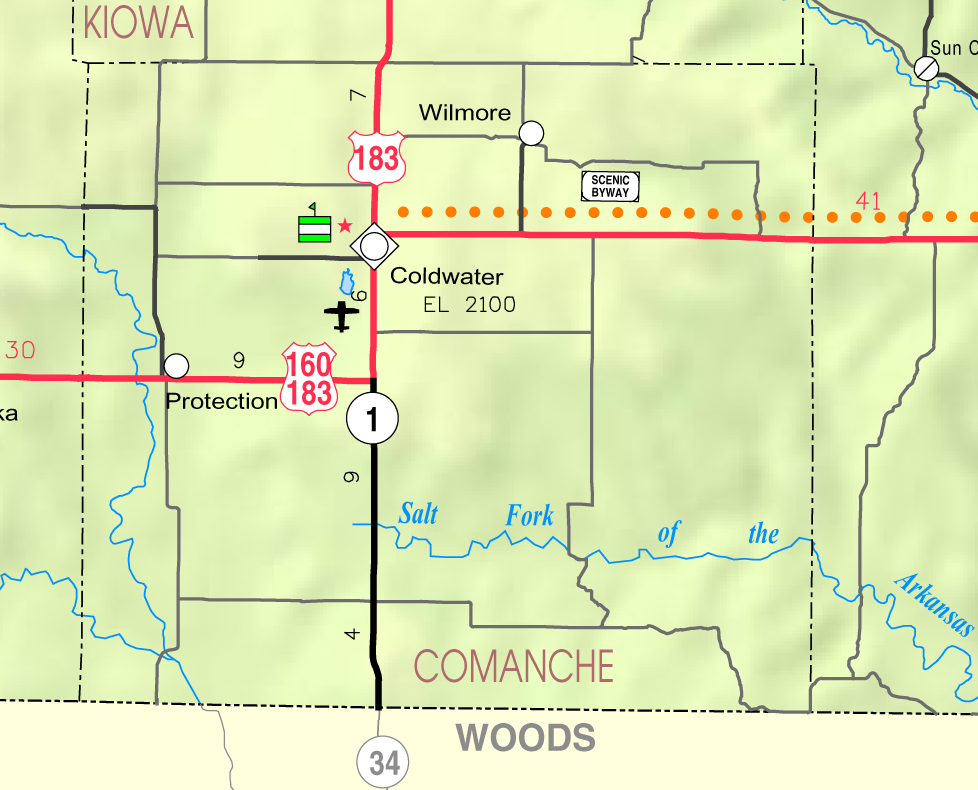
2005 map of Comanche County (map legend)

List of townships / incorporated cities / unincorporated communities / extinct former communities within Comanche County.

=== Cities ===
- Coldwater (county seat)
- Protection
- Wilmore

=== Unincorporated community ===
- Buttermilk

=== Townships ===
Comanche County is divided into four townships. None of the cities within the county are considered "governmentally independent", and all figures for the townships include those of the cities. In the following table, the population center is the largest city (or cities) included in that township's population total, if it is of a significant size.

Township	FIPS	Population center	Population	Population density /km^{2} (/sq mi)	Land area km^{2} (sq mi)	Water area km^{2} (sq mi)	Water %	Geographic coordinates
Avilla	03525		58	0 (0)	309 (119)	0 (0)	0.15%	37°5′14″N 99°17′20″W
Coldwater	14725	Coldwater	1,086	1 (3)	1,099 (424)	2 (1)	0.17%	37°16′6″N 99°18′5″W
Powell	57325		89	0 (1)	186 (72)	0 (0)	0.03%	37°20′36″N 99°8′37″W
Protection	57875	Protection	734	2 (4)	448 (173)	1 (0)	0.28%	37°12′20″N 99°29′16″W
Sources: "Census 2000 U.S. Gazetteer Files". U.S. Census Bureau, Geography Division. Archived from the original on August 2, 2002.

== See also ==
Community information for Kansas

- Kansas locations by per capita income
- List of counties in Kansas
- List of townships in Kansas
- List of cities in Kansas
- List of unincorporated communities in Kansas
- List of ghost towns in Kansas
- Dry counties
- National Register of Historic Places listings in Comanche County, Kansas
