= Kiowa Creek (Colorado) =

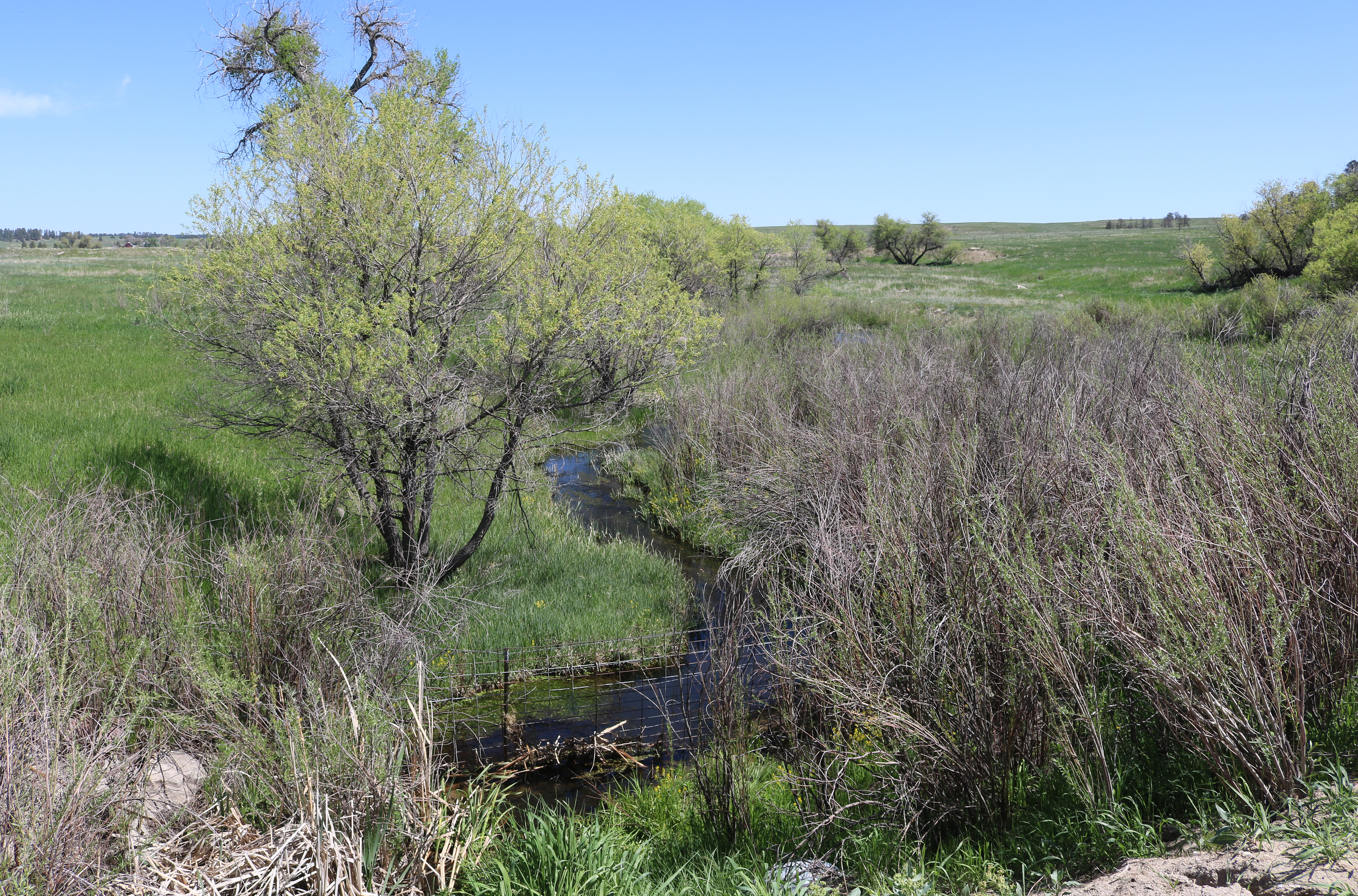
- The creek in Elbert, Colorado

Physical characteristics
- Source
  - coordinates: 39°02′26″N 104°37′03″W
- Mouth
  - location: Confluence with the South Platte
  - coordinates: 40°20′11″N 104°05′23″W
  - elevation: 4,383 ft (1,336 m)
- Basin size: 729 sq mi (1,890 km^{2})

Basin features
- Progression: South Platte—Platte— Missouri—Mississippi

Kiowa Creek is a 123-mile-long (198 km) tributary that flows northeast into the South Platte River in Morgan County, Colorado near Orchard. The creek's source is in the Black Forest of El Paso County, northeast of Colorado Springs, Colorado. Kiowa Creek rises in the highlands of the Colorado Piedmont and is subject to occasional flash floods.

== See also ==
- List of rivers of Colorado
