= Coldwater, Kansas =

City in Comanche County, Kansas

- City and County seat
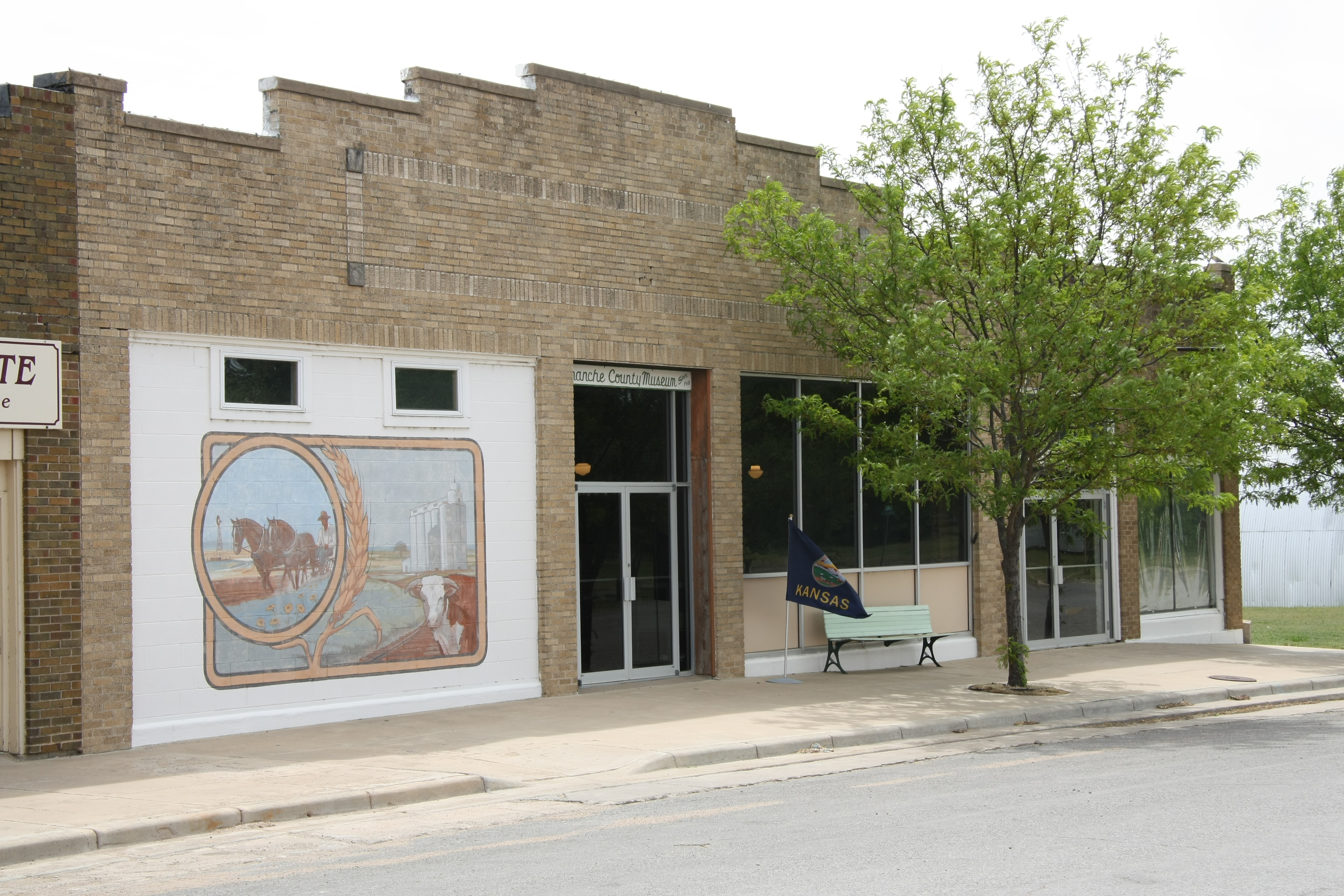
- Comanche County Museum (2010)

- Location within Comanche County and Kansas

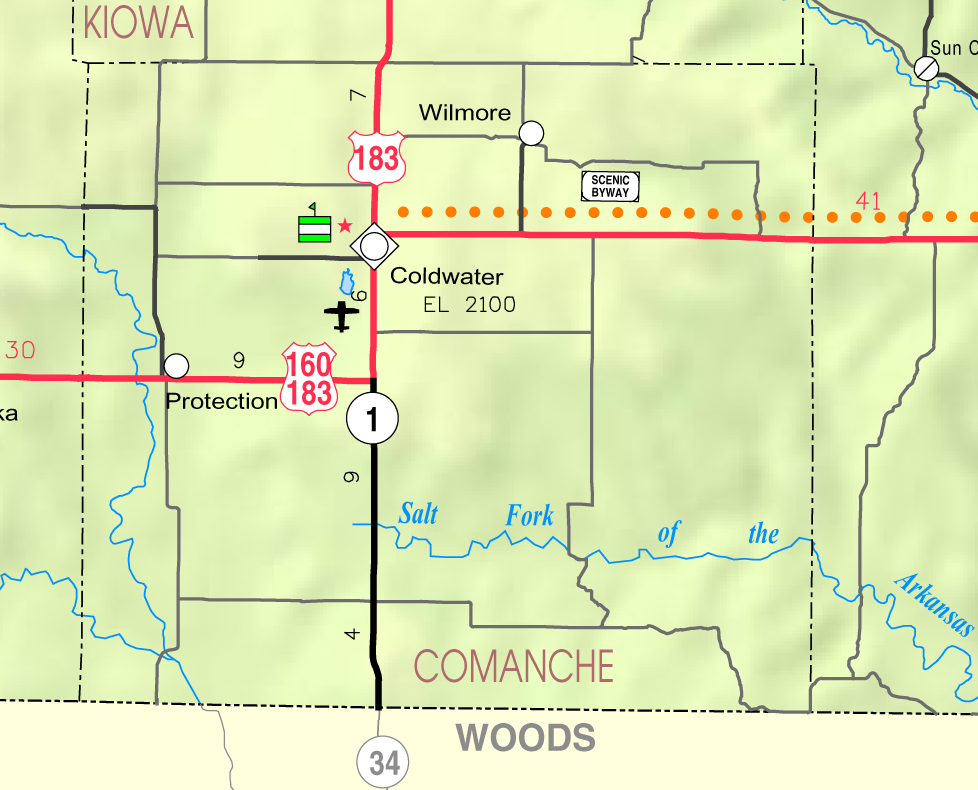
- KDOT map of Comanche County (legend)
- Coordinates: 37°15′00″N 99°20′54″W
- Country: United States
- State: Kansas
- County: Comanche
- Founded: 1884
- Incorporated: 1885
- Named for: Coldwater, Michigan

Area
  - Total: 2.90 sq mi (7.51 km^{2})
  - Land: 2.56 sq mi (6.64 km^{2})
  - Water: 0.34 sq mi (0.87 km^{2})
- Elevation: 2,008 ft (612 m)

Population (2020)
  - Total: 687
  - Density: 268/sq mi (103/km^{2})
- Time zone: UTC-6 (CST)
  - Summer (DST): UTC-5 (CDT)
- ZIP Code: 67029
- Area code: 620
- FIPS code: 20-14700
- GNIS ID: 2393591
- Website: coldwaterks.org

Coldwater is a city in and the county seat of Comanche County, Kansas, United States. As of the 2020 census, the population of the city was 687.

== History ==
In 1884 G.W. Vickers conceived the idea of laying out a town in the northern part of Comanche County, in company with Timothy Shields, J. P. Grove, Samuel Sisson, C. M. Cade and C. D. Bickford, all from Harper County. They preempted a section of land, had it platted off as a town site and named it after the city of Coldwater, Michigan. Early the following year the county had the required number of inhabitants, who petitioned the governor for its organization, and on February 27, 1885, it was organized with Owen Connaughton, George M. Morris and David T. Mclntire, commissioners and R. A. Grossman, clerk. Coldwater was designated as the county seat.

The first post office in Coldwater was established on October 17, 1884.

== Geography ==
According to the United States Census Bureau, the city has a total area of 2.98 square miles (7.72 km^{2}), of which 2.64 square miles (6.84 km^{2}) is land and 0.34 square miles (0.88 km^{2}) is water.

=== Climate ===
The climate in this area is characterized by hot, humid summers and generally mild to cool winters. According to the Köppen Climate Classification system, Coldwater has a humid subtropical climate, abbreviated "Cfa" on climate maps.

Climate data for Coldwater, Kansas, 1991–2020 normals, extremes 1893–present
Month	Jan	Feb	Mar	Apr	May	Jun	Jul	Aug	Sep	Oct	Nov	Dec	Year
Record high °F (°C)	84 (29)	90 (32)	101 (38)	100 (38)	103 (39)	111 (44)	114 (46)	115 (46)	108 (42)	100 (38)	90 (32)	85 (29)	115 (46)
Mean maximum °F (°C)	70.2 (21.2)	75.7 (24.3)	84.3 (29.1)	90.9 (32.7)	94.6 (34.8)	98.8 (37.1)	103.4 (39.7)	101.6 (38.7)	98.0 (36.7)	90.7 (32.6)	79.6 (26.4)	69.3 (20.7)	104.7 (40.4)
Mean daily maximum °F (°C)	49.3 (9.6)	53.7 (12.1)	63.5 (17.5)	72.5 (22.5)	80.8 (27.1)	89.6 (32.0)	94.6 (34.8)	92.6 (33.7)	85.6 (29.8)	74.2 (23.4)	60.9 (16.1)	49.5 (9.7)	72.2 (22.4)
Daily mean °F (°C)	36.6 (2.6)	40.2 (4.6)	49.6 (9.8)	58.6 (14.8)	68.0 (20.0)	77.2 (25.1)	82.0 (27.8)	80.3 (26.8)	72.7 (22.6)	60.8 (16.0)	47.9 (8.8)	37.6 (3.1)	59.3 (15.2)
Mean daily minimum °F (°C)	23.9 (−4.5)	26.7 (−2.9)	35.7 (2.1)	44.7 (7.1)	55.3 (12.9)	64.9 (18.3)	69.5 (20.8)	68.0 (20.0)	59.9 (15.5)	47.4 (8.6)	34.9 (1.6)	25.8 (−3.4)	46.4 (8.0)
Mean minimum °F (°C)	5.7 (−14.6)	8.7 (−12.9)	15.2 (−9.3)	27.4 (−2.6)	39.0 (3.9)	52.4 (11.3)	59.3 (15.2)	57.8 (14.3)	43.8 (6.6)	28.9 (−1.7)	15.9 (−8.9)	7.4 (−13.7)	0.6 (−17.4)
Record low °F (°C)	−18 (−28)	−15 (−26)	−9 (−23)	13 (−11)	22 (−6)	40 (4)	49 (9)	33 (1)	29 (−2)	14 (−10)	0 (−18)	−17 (−27)	−18 (−28)
Average precipitation inches (mm)	0.76 (19)	0.87 (22)	1.56 (40)	2.21 (56)	3.44 (87)	3.91 (99)	3.36 (85)	3.32 (84)	1.71 (43)	2.08 (53)	0.95 (24)	1.12 (28)	25.29 (640)
Average snowfall inches (cm)	3.5 (8.9)	4.0 (10)	3.2 (8.1)	0.5 (1.3)	0.0 (0.0)	0.0 (0.0)	0.0 (0.0)	0.0 (0.0)	0.0 (0.0)	0.1 (0.25)	1.2 (3.0)	4.6 (12)	17.1 (43.55)
Average precipitation days (≥ 0.01 in)	2.8	3.1	4.5	5.3	6.7	7.3	6.7	6.7	4.6	5.1	2.7	3.0	58.5
Average snowy days (≥ 0.1 in)	1.9	1.7	1.2	0.3	0.0	0.0	0.0	0.0	0.0	0.2	0.3	1.8	7.4
Source 1: NOAA
Source 2: National Weather Service

== Demographics ==
Historical population
Census	Pop.	Note	%±
1890	480		—
1900	263		−45.2%
1910	684		160.1%
1920	1,207		76.5%
1930	1,296		7.4%
1940	1,214		−6.3%
1950	1,208		−0.5%
1960	1,164		−3.6%
1970	1,016		−12.7%
1980	989		−2.7%
1990	939		−5.1%
2000	792		−15.7%
2010	828		4.5%
2020	687		−17.0%
U.S. Decennial Census

=== 2020 census ===
The 2020 United States census counted 687 people, 345 households, and 176 families in Coldwater. The population density was 268.1 per square mile (103.5/km^{2}). There were 442 housing units at an average density of 172.5 per square mile (66.6/km^{2}). The racial makeup was 91.85% (631) white or European American (89.37% non-Hispanic white), 0.58% (4) black or African-American, 0.15% (1) Native American or Alaska Native, 0.0% (0) Asian, 0.0% (0) Pacific Islander or Native Hawaiian, 1.31% (9) from other races, and 6.11% (42) from two or more races. Hispanic or Latino of any race was 5.97% (41) of the population.

Of the 345 households, 25.2% had children under the age of 18; 41.2% were married couples living together; 35.7% had a female householder with no spouse or partner present. 44.9% of households consisted of individuals and 26.7% had someone living alone who was 65 years of age or older. The average household size was 2.0 and the average family size was 3.2. The percent of those with a bachelor's degree or higher was estimated to be 11.6% of the population.

22.3% of the population was under the age of 18, 5.2% from 18 to 24, 21.8% from 25 to 44, 25.8% from 45 to 64, and 24.9% who were 65 years of age or older. The median age was 45.4 years. For every 100 females, there were 109.5 males. For every 100 females ages 18 and older, there were 118.0 males.

The 2016–2020 5-year American Community Survey estimates show that the median household income was $40,871 (with a margin of error of +/- $5,096) and the median family income was $71,250 (+/- $17,016). Males had a median income of $38,527 (+/- $5,717) versus $23,250 (+/- $7,657) for females. The median income for those above 16 years old was $27,355 (+/- $4,477). Approximately, 2.0% of families and 4.4% of the population were below the poverty line, including 2.4% of those under the age of 18 and 3.5% of those ages 65 or over.

=== 2010 census ===
As of the census of 2010, there were 828 people, 380 households, and 217 families residing in the city. The population density was 313.6 inhabitants per square mile (121.1/km^{2}). There were 458 housing units at an average density of 173.5 per square mile (67.0/km^{2}). The racial makeup of the city was 97.2% White, 0.1% African American, 0.2% Native American, 0.1% Asian, 0.1% Pacific Islander, 0.2% from other races, and 1.9% from two or more races. Hispanic or Latino of any race were 2.5% of the population.

There were 380 households, of which 26.8% had children under the age of 18 living with them, 45.5% were married couples living together, 7.6% had a female householder with no husband present, 3.9% had a male householder with no wife present, and 42.9% were non-families. 39.5% of all households were made up of individuals, and 18.9% had someone living alone who was 65 years of age or older. The average household size was 2.12 and the average family size was 2.81.

The median age in the city was 46.1 years. 23.3% of residents were under the age of 18; 5.7% were between the ages of 18 and 24; 19.2% were from 25 to 44; 26.8% were from 45 to 64; and 25.1% were 65 years of age or older. The gender makeup of the city was 47.5% male and 52.5% female.

== Area attractions ==
- Comanche County Historical Museum, 105 West Main Street.
- Chief Theater (NRHP), 122 East Main Street.
- Comanche County Courthouse (NRHP), 201 South New York Avenue.

== Education ==
The community is served by Comanche County USD 300 public school district. South Central High School is located in Coldwater.

Coldwater High School closed because of school unification. Coldwaters's mascot was the Eagles. The new mascot is currently the Timberwolves.

== Infrastructure ==
=== Transportation ===
U.S. routes 160 and 183 pass through Coldwater.

The Atchison, Topeka and Santa Fe Railway formerly provided passenger rail service to Coldwater on a line between Wichita and Englewood. Dedicated passenger service was provided until at least 1958, while mixed trains continued until at least 1961.

== Notable people ==
- Chick Brandom, baseball player
- Harold Herd, former Kansas Supreme Court justice (1979–1993), minority leader in Kansas State Senate (1969–1973), mayor of Coldwater (1950–1954), officer in the U.S. Navy during World War II.

== See also ==
- National Register of Historic Places listings in Kansas
