= Little Giant Fire =

2026 wildfire in the U.S. state of Washington

- Part of 2026 Washington wildfires
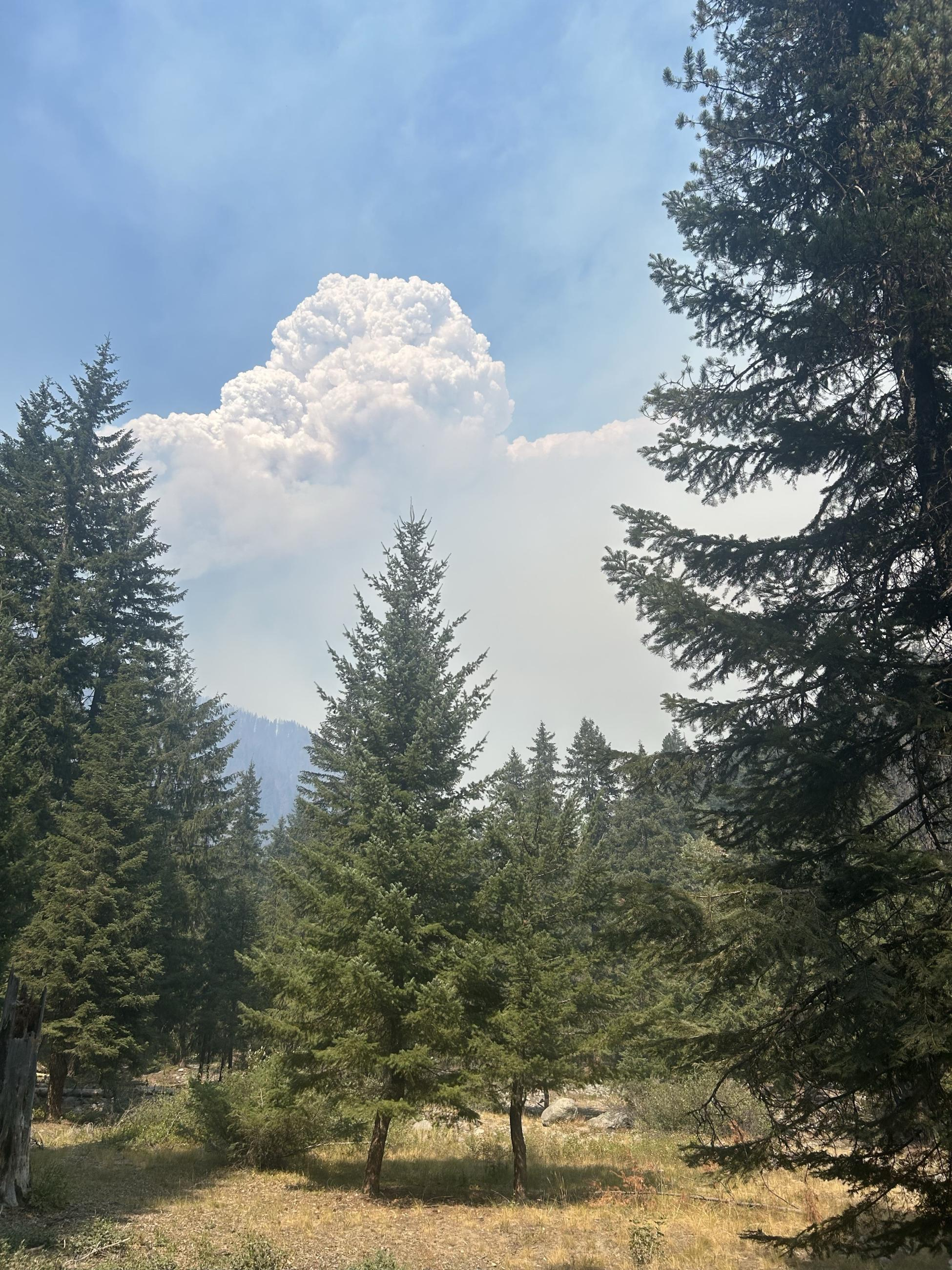
- Large smoke plume on August 10, 2026
- Date: July 15, 2026 – October 28, 2026
- Location: Chelan County, Washington, United States

Statisticshttps://wildfiresignal.com/fires/little-giant-33e00350d7/
- Perimeter: 100% contained
- Burned area: 172,912 acres (69,975 ha; 270 sq mi; 700 km^{2})

Ignition
- Cause: Lightning

The Little Giant Fire was a wildfire sparked by lightning in the Chiwawa River valley around 30 miles (48 km) northwest of Leavenworth, Washington, on July 15, 2026. It nearly reached 23,000 acres (9,300 ha) on July 27.

A pyrocumulus cloud from the fire was visible as far away as Seattle in late July. The Washington State Department of Natural Resources and the Washington National Guard are supporting firefighting operations, with additional support from the Washington State Guard. More than 100 Washington National Guard members and a Washington State Guard team were mobilized for the response on July 31. In early August it jumped nearly a mile across Lake Chelan and ballooned to over 50,000 acres. On August 4, Chelan County declared a state of emergency. At the time, over 1,000 people were actively fighting the fire.

On August 5, air quality index (AQI) in Leavenworth was recorded at more than seven times the "past traditional index maximum" of 500, and transit services were shut down per Washington Department of Labor and Industries safety rules when the AQI value exceeded 849.

The fire lasted 3 months, 13 days. It was 100% contained on October 28, 2026.

== See also ==
- Chelan Hills Fire – 2026 wildfire in the U.S. state of Washington
- Kaiser Canyon Fire – 2026 wildfire in the U.S. state of Washington
- Spokane Complex Fire – 2026 wildfire in the U.S. state of Washington
- Upriver Fire – 2026 wildfire in the U.S. state of Washington
