= 2026 Spokane fire =

2026 Spokane fire may refer to:

- Old Trails Fire
- Upriver Fire
