= Sinlahekin Fire =

2026 wildfire in the U.S. state of Washington

- Part of 2026 Washington wildfires
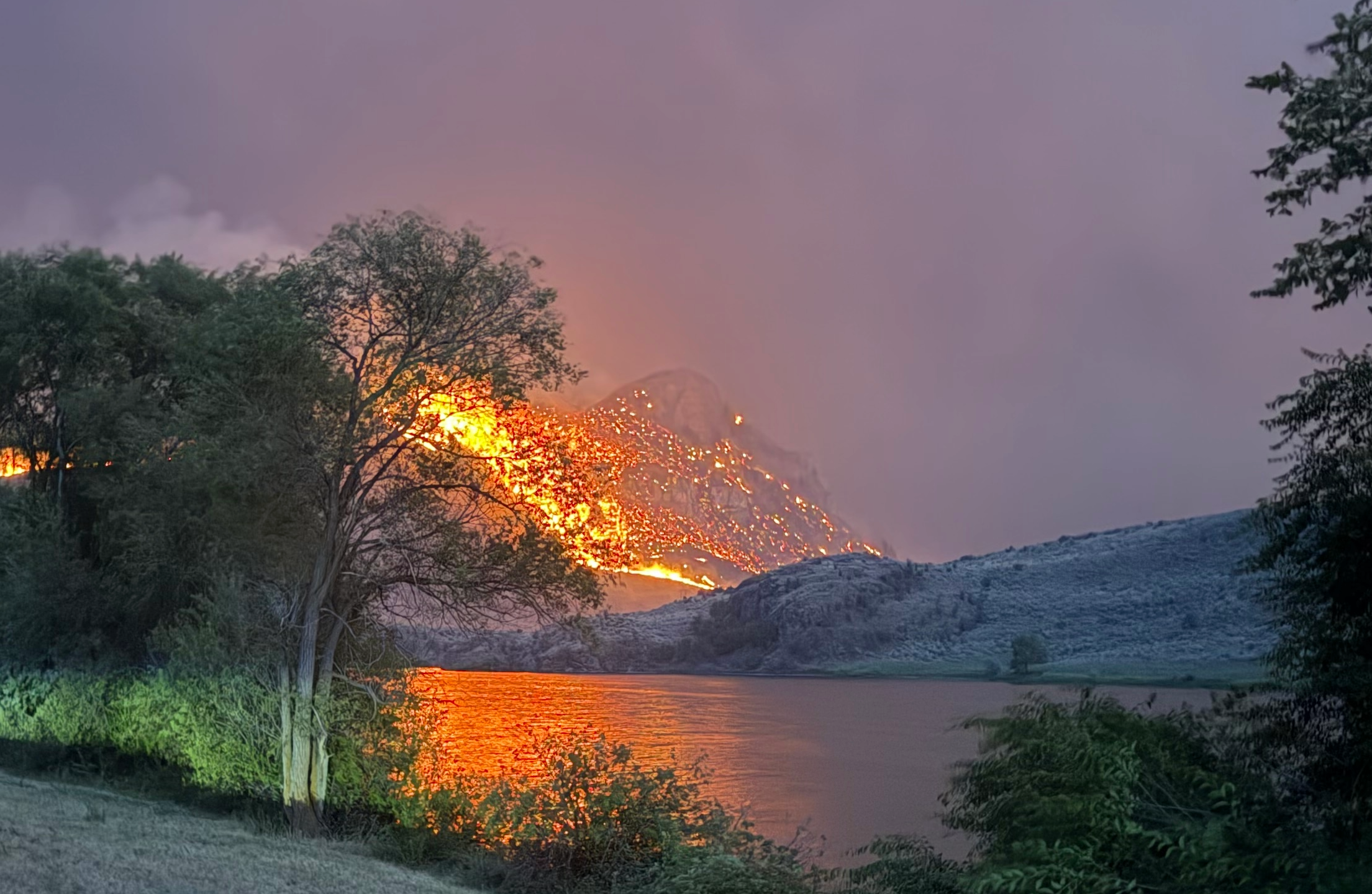
- Fire tacking down mountain side after dark
- Date: July 26–October 15, 2026
- Location: Okanogan County, Washington, United States
- Coordinates: 48°42′17″N 119°41′35″W

Statistics
- Perimeter: 100% contained
- Burned area: 166,084 acres (67,212 ha; 260 sq mi; 672 km^{2})
- Land use: wildlands/orchards

Impacts
- Structures destroyed: c. 30

Ignition
- Cause: Lightning

The Sinlahekin Fire was a wildfire sparked by lightning in the Sinlahekin Valley 12 mi (19 km) west of Tonasket, Washington, United States, on July 26, 2026. The fire grew over the next week before doubling in size on August 1 during a particularly dangerous situation (PDS) red flag warning event. By August 12, the fire had grown to the largest in the state that year, and one of the largest on state record. During the fire, evacuation orders have impacted Loomis, Washington, and the area west of County Highway 7 north of Tonasket. The fire was fully contained on October 15.

== Fire management ==
Initial fire management was placed under Northeast Washington Incident Management Team #1, with it being transitioned to CalFire CIMT 4 team that was sent to Washington to take command on July 30. By August 11 the Washington National Guard was assisting the fire response with resources and equipment. Crews stationed at Army Aviation Support Facility Two in Wenatchee were dispatched to the fire, a normal role for national guard units. This fire was the first time that UH-72 Lakota helicopters were used as aerial command and observation platforms. Flights were conducted over the fire zones with CalFire and WA DNR leadership groups to visually assess fire progress, terrain, and conditions. By early September containment had grown to over 50% of the fire zone, while fire growth slowed. As a result the management team made the decision to start releasing some work crews to return home from the incident group.

== Progression ==
Fire and Emergency New Zealand crew checking for hot spots

The fire was sparked by a lightning strike approximately 12 mi (19 km) west of Tonasket, Washington, in the Sinlahekin Valley on July 26. The first incident management report was issued on July 28, when the fire was 2,313 acres (936 ha) documenting a personnel size of 170. The fire was located in rough rocky terrain with large rock outcrops impeding fire line construction. Additionally the fire caused falling boulders up to the size of ATVs and rolling burning snags. In the last week of July an intense heat dome was present over a large portion of the western United States, bringing high temperatures and dry conditions to the Spokane area. In combination with the existing conditions, forecasts predicted the possibility of "historically strong winds" on August 1. Given the likelihood of fire activity on August 1, fire crews focused work on structure prevention as much as possible with attention to the Aeneas Mountain communications tower. Wider level 2 and level 3 evacuation notices were also issued. Over the week the humidity in the region continued to drop raising the fire potential of fuels while steady winds increased in strength at the same time. Due to spotting activity from the winds in the northern area, by July 31 the fire perimeter had approached to 1 mi (1.6 km) of the southern outskirts of Loomis, Washington, and a level 3 evacuation for the community was issued. A Central Pierce and Kitsap County joint fire crew on the ground reported working behind the fire front when the shift happened. With a flame front being rapidly pushed towards their location, the crew was forced into an estimated 10 mi (16 km) retreat with the fire wall following behind them. Rescue of a family who stayed in the fire zone despite evacuation notice resulted in a near miss with the flames.

At noon on August 1, Washington Governor Bob Ferguson declared a state of emergency given the extreme conditions and large fires already burning statewide and the National Weather Service issuing its first-ever "particularly dangerous situation" (PDS) red flag warning for Central and Eastern Washington. The PDS flag is a rarely issued warning used by the National weather service for the most extreme fire condition scenarios. The morning fire size was listed as 31,887 acres (12,904 ha) however within 24 hours the size had more than doubled to 73,794 acres (29,863 ha), a jump of 41,907 acres (16,959 ha).

Extreme winds during the evening caused a significant run on the northern borders, with long distance spotting, some times miles ahead of the front reported. During the earlier afternoon the winds were strong and blowing a southwesterly direction, however as the afternoon progressed, they shifted to a strong northerly direction and the fires reversed in direction as well. This resulted in the fire sweeping along Okanogan County Highway 7 which runs parallel to the Okanogan River between Tonasket and Oroville, Washington. The fire progress in areas was slowed when the flames moved into agricultural land and orchard groves. An expansive level 3 evacuation was issued for the entire region west of the Okanogan River/highway 7 from Tonasket northwards.

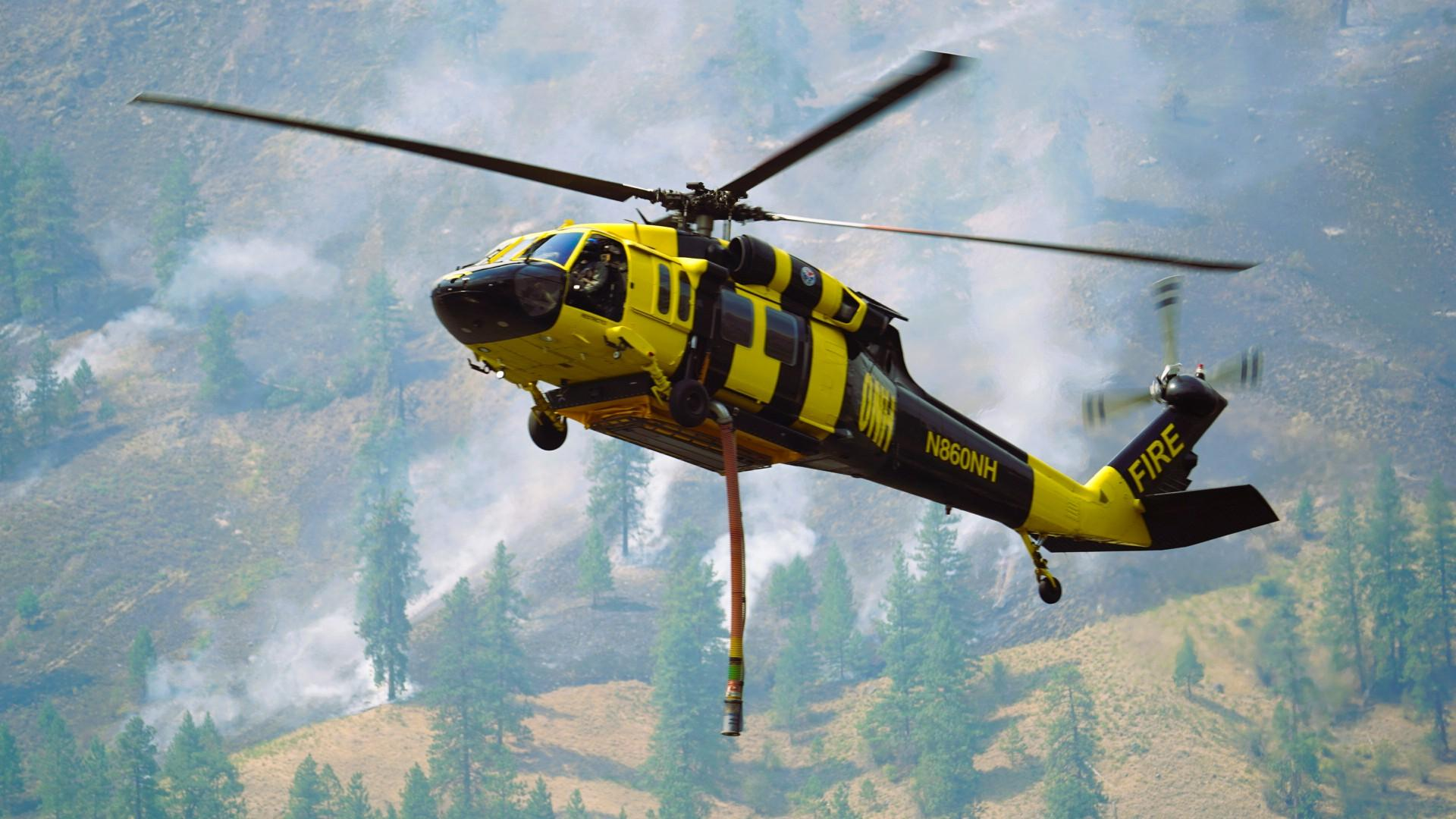
Northwest Helicopters Black Hawk "Bumblebee" performing water drops

Growth of the fire continued and by August 4, it had passed the 100,000 acres (40,000 ha) mark. However some of the evacuation orders put in place on over the August 1–2 weekend had already been downgraded, notably those from the Canadian border south to the area of Ellisforde which dropped from level 3 to level 2. Smoke from the fire greatly lowered the air quality across northern Ferry and Stevens counties along with areas of southern British Columbia. By August 12, it had expanded to almost 150,000 acres (61,000 ha), becoming the largest fire of the 2026 Washington wildfire season, and one of the ten largest fires on record in the state. Fire containment was steady for a week leading up to August 12, when two separate instances along the western perimeter caused a drop in the total containment estimate from 42% to 37%. A burning tree fell over a fire line in one area while a spot fire in another section grew the total fire acreage by over 3,000 acres (1,200 ha). Weather conditions had been moderate in the days before August 13 and a series of thunderstorms overnight August 12–13 included needed rain which lowered temperatures and raised the humidity in areas of the fire zone.

Fire activity mostly shifted to the western areas of the fire zone keeping hundreds of residents in the region under evacuation. With survey of the fire area was still being conducted, officials estimated that at least 30 structures had been lost, however no fatalities or injuries had been attributed to the fire. By August 16, it had grown to 152,682 acres (61,788 ha). On August 18 the incident management team reported 1,731 personnel assigned to various aspects of the fire, and use of bulldozers, logging feller bunchers, and skidders for the construction and reinforcement of fire lines.

Fire growth continued and by late August with a total size which had increased to 166,378 acres (67,331 ha). The fire was eclipsed in size however on the same day by the Little Giant Fire southwest in Chelan County which passed 171,163 acres (69,267 ha) in size on the same day, and the largest fire fully ever to burn entirely within Chelan County. The reported containment percentage was raised to approximately 44% as of September 5 based on continued hot spot removal along many sections of the western fire front, and by September 8, it was again raised to 69%, with the management team noting that growth across the fire was slowing.

== Clean up and rehabilitation ==
With fire growth slowing in early September, a number of crews were tasked with fire clean-up and environmental rehabilitation activity. Based on drying soil conditions after rain events, heavy equipment crews were dispatched to the Palmer Mountain area where they concentrated on building erosion control features plus removing dirt berms. Other crews focused around skidders and processors started the task of processing felled trees and brush in several areas. Warnings to watch out for wide loads on the highways out of the fire area were issued, and with the increase of fall rains, warnings about possible rain generated debris flows on highways.

== Economic impact ==
Due to the abnormally high volume of burned forest lands over the 2026 fire season, estimated at over 886,000 acres (359,000 ha) by September 5, Washington state started to explore expedited timber salvage sales in burn areas. With a portion of the state schools budget coming from timber revenue, proponents of the rapid sale looked at salvaging as much before quality loss due to decay and molding. Within the Sinlahekin burn, several parcels of timber already auctioned by the state for harvesting were burned, but due to stipulations in the contracts, the buyers are still responsible for paying the pre burn value. Two other parcels were being readied for auction also burned, and had an estimated value of at least $800,000 based on similar sales. The salvage sale on those parcels are appraised at a minimum bid of $218,000, over $600,000 in value that was destroyed by the burn.
