= 2026 Washington wildfires =

Wildfires in Washington, United States

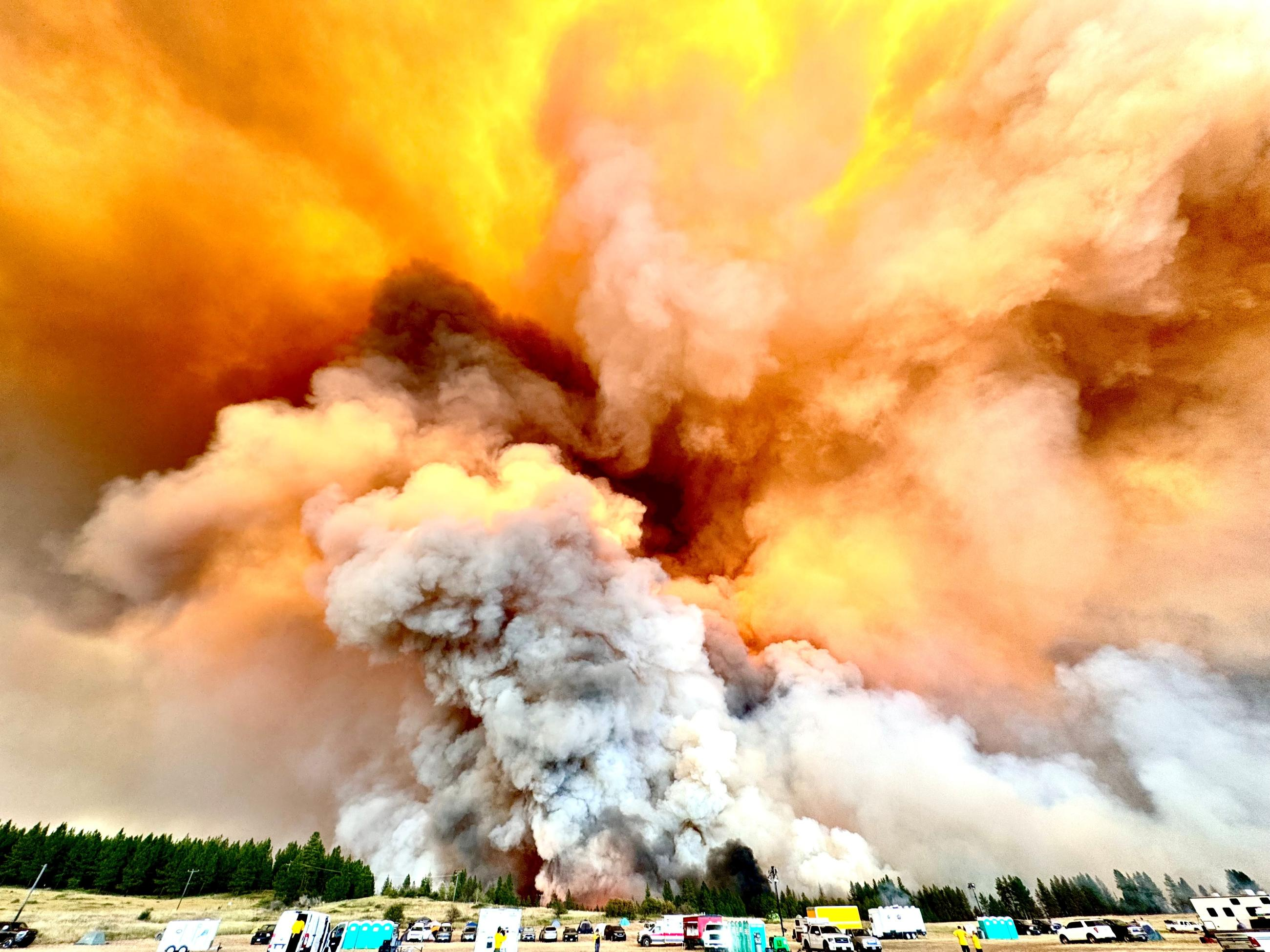
- Modrite Fire seen from Inchelium July 30
- Date: May 7, 2026 - ongoing

Statistics
- Total area: 851,000 acres (344,000 ha)

Impacts
- Deaths: 2
- Evacuated: 11,000

Fire behavior within the Kaiser Canyon Fire

The 2026 Washington wildfire season is an ongoing series of wildfires in the U.S. state of Washington.

== Background ==
The state legislature appropriated $120 million for firefighting in 2026, twice the previous year's budget.

As of May 2026, the National Interagency Fire Center predicted above average wildfire risk for Eastern Washington in June 2026; above average for all of Eastern Washington and most of Western Washington in July; and above average for the entire state in August. The risk assessments reflected a combination of early-season drying due to low snowpack, which led to drought conditions in the region; the Washington State Department of Ecology declared statewide drought emergency in early April.

== Events ==
The fire season started on May 7, 2026, with the Libby Creek Fire in the Okanogan–Wenatchee National Forest. It was suspected to be the result of human activity in the forest, and was contained in about a day.

On May 27 and May 28, members of the Washington National Guard conducted wildfire training in anticipation of summer mobilizations.

By June 12, the Department of Natural Resources had responded to over 200 wildfires.

The first fatality of the year was due to the Upriver Fire just outside Spokane city limits.

Another fatality was reported in July due to the Chelan Hills Fire.

On July 15 and July 16, much of Washington was subject to isolated dry thunderstorms, leading to the issuance of red flag warnings for a large portion of the state. These dry thunderstorms, further aided by hot and windy conditions, would spark numerous large wildfires across Washington and Oregon. The Kaiser Canyon Fire in particular would scorch over 50,000 acres in a matter of days, prompting numerous evacuations for the entire population of Nespelem.

On August 1, the Storm Prediction Center would issue a rare Extremely Critical Risk in its Day 1 Fire Weather Outlook, encompassing the majority of Eastern Washington, due to dangerously high winds and low humidity. This would lead to the issuance of the first ever PDS Red Flag Warning in Washington State history. The same day, Governor Bob Ferguson declared a statewide fire emergency and outdoor burn ban through September 30.

On August 5, air quality index (AQI) in Leavenworth was recorded at more than seven times the "past traditional index maximum" of 500. Some transit services were shut down per Washington Department of Labor and Industries safety rules when the AQI value exceeded 849. Most of the smoke was from the Little Giant Fire about 30 miles (48 km) away.

On August 7, the governor declared a statewide public health emergency due to wildfire smoke.

On November 10, the Washington wildfire season was officially declaredover by Washington state Public Lands Commissioner, Dave Upthegrove. According to Upthegrove, more than 1500 fires were recorded in the state in 2026, burning nearly 1 million acres. Reports from late September indicated 649 primary residences destroyed by wildfire in 2026, with many homes lost in August's devastating Spokane area fires.

== List of wildfires ==
The following is a list of fires that burned more than 1,000 acres (400 ha), or produced significant structural damage or casualties.

| Name | County | Size | Start date | Containment date (Note: Containment means that fire crews have established and secured control lines around the fire's perimeter. These lines are artificial barriers, like trenches or cleared vegetation, designed to stop the fire's spread, or natural barriers like rivers. Containment reflects progress in managing the fire but does not necessarily mean the fire is starved of fuel, under control, or put out.) | Statistics reference | Cause | Notes | Images |
|---|---|---|---|---|---|---|---|---|
| Waste Way | Grant | c. 300 acres (120 ha) | May 17 | May 18 | | Human | In and around drainage canal near Mattawa, Washington, affected high voltage transmission lines. | |
| Country Meadows | Benton | 1,700 acres (690 ha) | May 23 | c. May 30 | | escaped controlled burn | In Badger Canyon, resulted in evacuation orders. | |
| Highway 24 | Yakima | 8,000 acres (3,200 ha) | June 4 | June 5 | | | Burned north of State Route 24 16 miles (26 km) east of Moxee. | |
| Chestnut | Chelan | 1,500 acres (610 ha) | June 6 | June 8 | | | Prompted level 2 evacuations for Chelan Falls. | |
| Juniper Dunes | Franklin | 13,003 acres (5,262 ha) | June 13 | June 18 | | | Burned within the Juniper Dunes Wilderness and closed the area. Firefighting in wilderness area conducted with hand tools alone, due to absence of transportation infrastructure. | |
| Highway 730 | Walla Walla, Umatilla (Oregon) | 8,262 acres (3,344 ha) | June 14 | June 17 | | | Burned near highway 12 and moved south, crossing into Oregon. Prompted evacuations. | |
| Tule | Yakima | 24,090 acres (9,750 ha) | June 14 | June 22 | | | Burning next to and closed Highway 97 in both directions. Grew rapidly. | |
| Highway 17 | Grant | 1,300 acres (530 ha) | June 16 | June 16 | | Vehicle crash | Burned near State Route 17 east of Ephrata. Officials were "urging residents near Highway 17 east of Ephrata to leave the area if they fe[lt] unsafe due to a growing grass fire". | |
| Tucannon | Columbia | 8,069 acres (3,265 ha) | June 16 | June 20 | | | Burning 8 miles (13 km) east of Dayton. | |
| Roza | Kittitas, Yakima | 3,923 acres (1,588 ha) | June 16 | June 25 | | Human | Closed Interstate 82 between Selah and Ellensburg and State Route 821. Burned in Yakima Canyon. | |
| Kartar | Okanogan | 11,746 acres (4,753 ha) | June 16 | July 8 | | Human | Burning near Keller and merged with another fire. Prompting evacuations. | |
| Upriver | Spokane | 213 acres (86 ha) | June 16 | June 24 | | | Remains of one individual discovered on June 17. At least 15 homes destroyed and evacuation of over 10,000 people on June 16–17. | |
| Garred Road | Grant | 3,369 acres (1,363 ha) | June 22 | June 26 | | | 4 miles (6 km) west of Coulee City; caused June 23 evacuations at Sun Lakes Park Resort and closed U.S. Route 2. | |
| Luna | Whatcom | 3,692 acres (1,494 ha) | June 26 | | | Lightning | Started 10 mi (16 km) north of Newhalem | |
| Lambdin | Walla Walla | 13,300 acres (5,400 ha) | June 29 | July 6 | | | Caused Level 2 and 3 evacuations and jumped highway US 12. | |
| Chelan Hills | Douglas | 9,700 acres (3,900 ha) | July 4 | July 10 | | | Jumped several roadways and a canyon as it moved northeast, prompted evacuations for Chelan Hills. Likely destroyed or damaged approximately 100 structures, including 19 primary residences confirmed destroyed. One person perished in the fire. | |
| B and O | Okanogan | 2,927 acres (1,185 ha) | July 9 | | | | Near Okanogan | |
| Kaiser Canyon | Okanogan, Ferry | 138,213 acres (55,933 ha) | July 16 | | | lightning | Started near Nespelem, moved into the outskirts of town itself leading to the forced evacuation of over 1,000 people. Multiple structures destroyed, including a historic Indian Shaker Church building. Encircled the community by July 19 to 21, with access to Nespelem uncertain. Nespelem evacuated July 25. | |
| Lyons Ferry | Adams, Franklin, Whitman | 34,011 acres (13,764 ha) | July 16 | | | Lightning | Burning in Lyons Ferry State Park near Kahlotus; prompted "go now" evacuations. Caused hazardous air quality in Spokane. | |
| Neff Jones | Franklin | 7,150 acres (2,890 ha) | July 16 | | | Lightning | Near the Snake River. | |
| Devils Canyon | Franklin | 4,747 acres (1,921 ha) | July 16 | | | Lightning | Near Kahlotus. | |
| Royal Lake | Adams | 2,037 acres (824 ha) | July 16 | | | | Near Othello. | |
| Little Giant Fire | Chelan | 116,996 acres (47,347 ha) | July 16 | | | Lightning | Burning in the Cascade foothills north of Plain; caused multiple level 3 "go now" evacuations. | |
| Border 2 | Whatcom | 11,618 acres (4,702 ha) (Canada & U.S.) | July 16 | | | Lightning | East of Ross Lake. Straddles Canada–United States border and named the Hozomeen Mountain Wildfire in Canada where it grew to over 6,000 acres by August 10. | |
| Paradise | Walla Walla | 8,633 acres (3,494 ha) | July 16 | | | | Burning in Oregon and Washington | |
| Modrite | Ferry | 57,594 acres (23,307 ha) | July 17 | | | Lightning | Near Franklin D. Roosevelt Lake; prompted "go now" evacuations. Powerlines to Inchelium, Covada, and the Silver Creek area were destroyed by the fire. | |
| Ptarmigan | Okanogan | 24,721 acres (10,004 ha) | July 17 | | | Lightning | Burning near the Canadian border. | |
| High Lava | Skamania | 1,717 acres (695 ha) | July 23 | | | Lightning | 10 mi (16 km) northwest of Stabler. | |
| Signal Peak | Yakima | 3,000 acres (1,200 ha) | July 24 | August 1 | | | Burned just to the South of White Swan, just missing the town. | |
| Bradeen Hill | Stevens | 4,417 acres (1,787 ha) | July 25 | August 16 | | Human | Burning near Gifford. | |
| Pearl Hill | Douglas | 8,058 acres (3,261 ha) | July 25 | July 29 | | | Burning near Bridgeport within the burn scar of a 2020 fire holding the same name. | |
| Sinlahekin | Okanogan | 154,480 acres (62,520 ha) | July 26 | | | Lightning | Burning west of Tonasket in the Sinlahekin Valley region. | |
| White Swan/Ransier | Yakima | 1,302 acres (527 ha) | July 26 | | | | Started just Southeast of White Swan, due West the Signal Peak fire. Level 3 "go now" evacuations would be issued as the fire burned through part of White Swan, destroying 24 structures including 16 homes. | |
| Autumn Lane | Spokane, Stevens | 5,782 acres (2,340 ha) | August 1 | August 16 | | | Part of the Spokane Complex Fires. Three fires (Old Trails, Fairview, and Autumn Lane) started near Spokane amid extremely dry and windy conditions during an unprecedented Particularly Dangerous Situation Red Flag Warning. Started just South of Suncrest across the Spokane River. The fire quickly jumped the river and burned to the East, prompting numerous level 3 "go now" evacuations as it reentered Spokane County. | |
| Fairview | Spokane | 993 acres (402 ha) | August 1 | August 16 | | | Part of the Spokane Complex Fires. Three fires (Old Trails, Fairview, and Autumn Lane) started near Spokane amid extremely dry and windy conditions during an unprecedented Particularly Dangerous Situation Red Flag Warning. The Fairview fire started east of Spokane and rapidly spread uphill and with winds into residential neighborhoods, farms, and scattered homes. | |
| Old Trails | Spokane | 3,176 acres (1,285 ha) | August 1 | August 16 | | Arson (Suspect charged, not yet convicted) | Part of the Spokane Complex Fires. Three fires (Old Trails, Fairview, and Autumn Lane) started near Spokane amid extremely dry and windy conditions during an unprecedented Particularly Dangerous Situation Red Flag Warning. Old Trails started near Airway Heights and quickly spread towards the city limits of Spokane. After jumping the Spokane River, the fire prompted numerous level 3 "go now" evacuations as it burned through highly populated suburban areas of the city. | |
| Hudspeth | Stevens | 6,512 acres (2,635 ha) | August 1 | | | Under investigation | Burning near Hunters. | |
| Red Sky | Yakima | 4,283 acres (1,733 ha) | August 1 | August 2 | | | Burned in Southern Yakima, Washington; prompted level 3 "go now" evacuations. | |
| Mitre Rock | Stevens, Lincoln | 4,518 acres (1,828 ha) | August 1 | August 9 | | Under investigation | Burned near Fort Spokane. | |
| Three Queens | Kittitas | 6,379 acres (2,581 ha) | July 15 | | | Lightning | Six miles (10 km) east of Snoqualmie Pass | |
| Colwash | Yakima, Benton | 34,733 acres (14,056 ha) | August 22 | | | | Burning near Toppenish; Grew from 30 acre vegetation fire to over 34,000 acres within 1 day. | |
