= Washington State Guard =

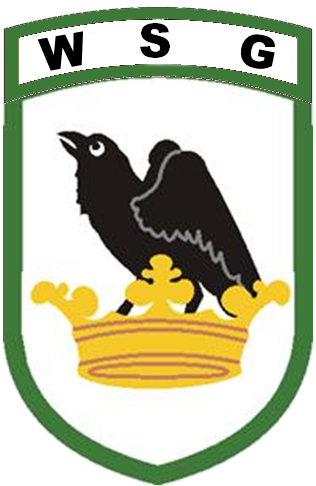
- Shoulder sleeve insignia of the Washington Army National Guard Element, Joint Headquarters with the addition of the Washington State Guard (WSG) tab
- Active: 1917–1920; 1941–1947; 1960–present
- Country: United States
- Allegiance: Washington
- Type: State Defense Force
- Role: Public duties, Internal security, Civil defense
- Size: 80 (2016)
- Garrison/HQ: Camp Murray
- Mottos: Latin: Pro Civitas Et Patria (English: For State and Country)
- Engagements: Spanish-American War; World War I (home front); World War II (home front)
- Website: https://mil.wa.gov/state-guard

Commanders
- Commander-in-Chief: Governor Bob Ferguson
- Adjutant General: Major General Gent Welsh, ANG
- Commander: Colonel (WA) Joseph Maassen
- Chief of Staff: Colonel (WA) Peter Lukevich
- Command Sergeant Major: Command Sergeant Major (WA) Richard Stickney

Insignia
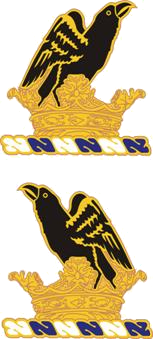
- Distinctive unit insignia (also worn by Headquarters, Washington Army National Guard)

- Beret flash

The Washington State Guard is the state defense force of the U.S. state of Washington. It is an all-volunteer, uniformed public service organization which serves under the command of the Governor of Washington as commander-in-chief and is directed by the Adjutant General. It is an element of the state's military forces, which also include the Washington Army National Guard and the Washington Air National Guard, but it stands separate from the National Guard and is used for service within the State of Washington.

== History ==
=== Territorial militia background ===
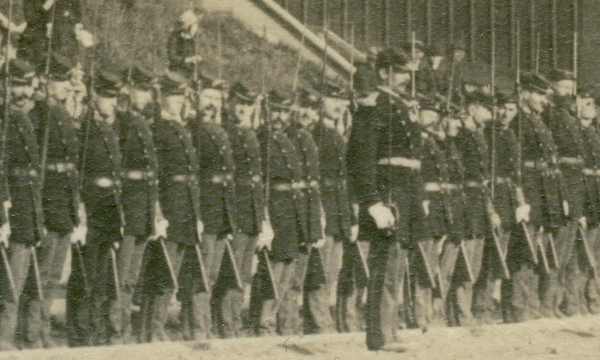
Territorial Militia pictured in Seattle in 1880

In early 1855, on the eve of the Yakima War, the legislature of Washington Territory authorized the creation of the Washington Territorial Volunteers (WTV), the first militia raised in what would become the state of Washington. The defeat of the U.S. Army that year at the Battle of Toppenish Creek sparked panic throughout the territory that an Indian uprising was in progress; hastily organized WTV companies elected their own officers and quickly put to the field with little in the way of arms or provisions. Ignoring regulations, nearby U.S. Army posts supplied the territorial forces with firearms, as did the captains of two federal warships operating in the area: USS Decatur and USRC Jefferson Davis. Over the course of the conflict, one half of all adult men in the territory would render military service.

In 1903, with the passage of the Dicks Act, the Washington militia and the militias of the other states were standardized as the National Guard and became part of the reserve forces of the United States, "the first step towards the eventual federalization of the traditional organized militia".

=== World War I establishment ===
In the early 20th century Washington saw increasing levels of civil unrest, occasioned in part by the growing influence of the Industrial Workers of the World in the state. Disturbances in Spokane in 1917 prompted Governor Ernest Lister to declare martial law and order a major deployment of National Guard troops into the city. With the potential of U.S. entry into World War I, Lister resolved that a fallback military force would need to be raised to guard against insurrection while the Washington National Guard was in federal service. Contingency plans for such a force had already been drawn-up by the state's military department and Governor Lister authorized its creation on July 11, 1917. Sixteen infantry companies were organized into what was designated the Third Provisional Regiment and the Washington State Guard became operational on November 15, 1917. With the end of World War I came the disbandment of the State Guard.

=== World War II reactivation ===
In January 1941 the Washington National Guard was mobilized into federal service and the Washington State Guard reestablished to assume responsibility for state military missions. Not long after, however, it was determined by state officials that the increased probability of U.S. entry into World War II carried with it a heightened threat of invasion and the new force would need to be reorganized to defend the state's territory rather than simply fulfill civil assistance missions. Recruiting was suspended and the entirety of the force was organized into the State Guard Reserve, which was simply a roster of individual personnel. (Note: Organization of the State Guard Reserve was also intended to arrest a tendency that "had developed in many of the coastal areas to organize guerilla bands, which were not tied in with any law enforcement agency".)

In June, soldiers of the State Guard Reserve began to be reconstituted into a formed force with the activation of the Fourth Washington Volunteer Infantry Regiment. As of December the regiment was fully trained and equipped and, by early 1942, the size of the State Guard had increased to just over 4,000 soldiers and officers with the force reorganized into two brigades. The bulk of the force spent the rest of 1942 conducting weekly drills to repel an anticipated Japanese invasion of Washington, while a smaller contingent of 30 personnel were activated to full-time status to man nine observation posts on the Olympic Peninsula. The State Guard, during this time, was primarily composed of older men, however, in 1944 the state began actively recruiting younger males with the idea that it could provide a potential source of post-war manpower for the returned National Guard.

During World War II, Washington's unusually large State Guard, relative to those maintained by other states, "reflected its insecurities over its exposed location". In 1947, with the end of World War II, the State Guard was, once more, disbanded.

=== Disbandment and legal gap ===
In 1950, three years after the dissolution of the Washington State Guard, provisions of federal law which permitted states to raise military forces separate from their National Guards expired. A 1953 legal opinion penned by the Attorney-General of Washington concluded that "there is no provision in the National Defense Act for the organization or maintenance of military forces, other than the National Guard, within the state. The organization of the state guard reserve at this time would not be authorized". In 1958, however, an amendment to the U.S. Code provided that "in addition to its National Guard, if any, a State, the Commonwealth of Puerto Rico, the District of Columbia, Guam, or the Virgin Islands may, as provided by its laws, organize and maintain defense forces".

=== Cold War reactivation ===
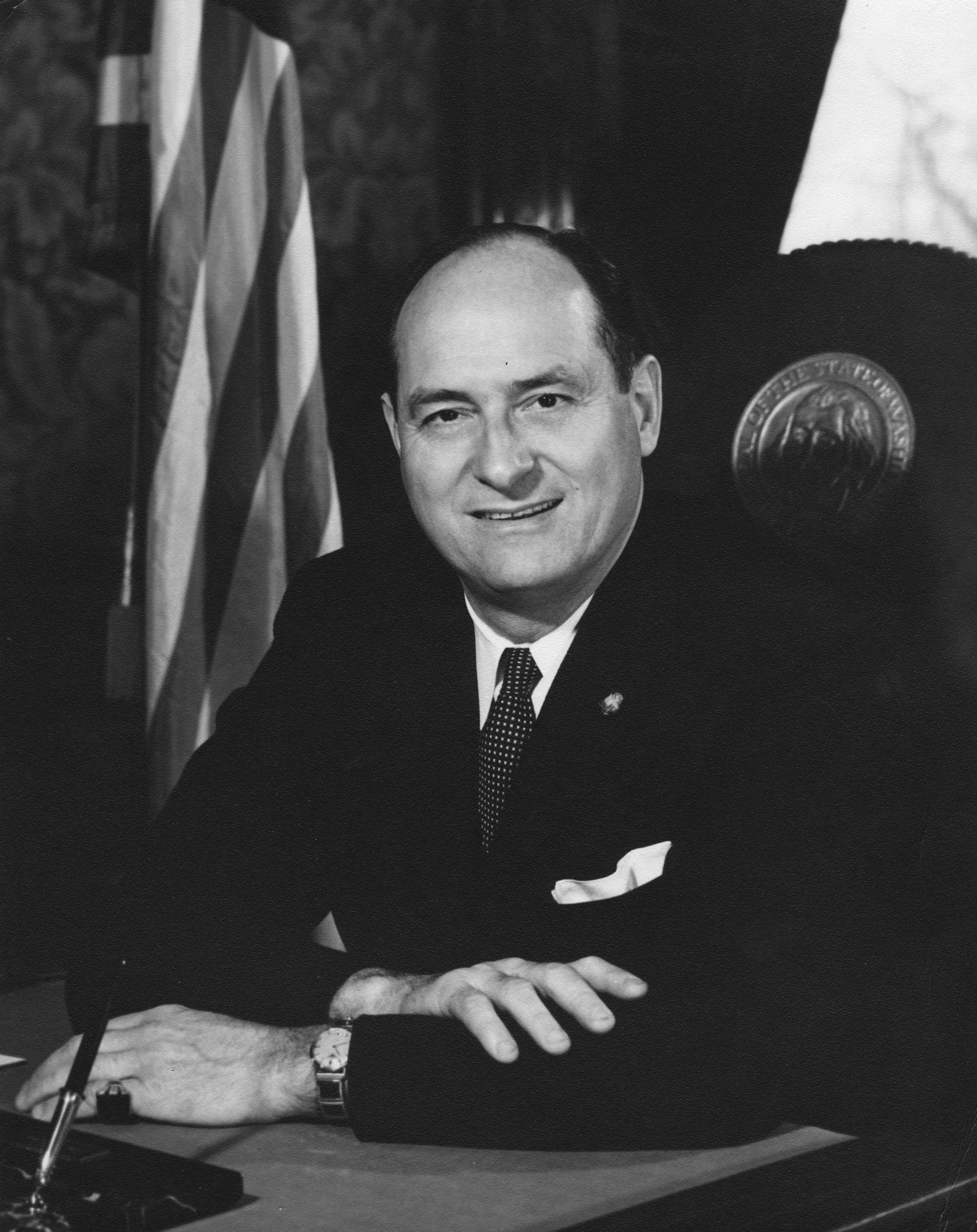
In 1960, after a 13-year hiatus, Governor Albert Rosellini (pictured) ordered the reactivation of the Washington State Guard

The returned ability of states to raise a military separate from the National Guard saw Washington "at the forefront" of a small number of states that quickly moved to resurrect their forces, a callback to Washington's decision two decades before to outfit an unusually large and robust State Guard. On May 19, 1960, Governor Albert Rosellini issued an executive order commanding that "the Washington State Guard Reserve is established as a part of the organized militia of the State ... [to] function as an additional internal security force within the State for employment, in event of an emergency declared by the Governor, to augment the National Guard in protecting life and property; preserving order and public safety; and taking preventive action against threats to the internal security of the State".

Creation of the Washington State Guard Reserve came at the instigation of adjutant-general Gen. George Haskett due to concern the entire National Guard might be deployed outside the state in the event of war with the Soviet Union. It soon recruited 112 former U.S. Army and Washington National Guard officers; the force was conceived of and organized as a command nucleus around which a larger element could be rapidly raised in the event of a crisis. It was formed into a skeleton headquarters detachment and five cadre-staffed internal security battalions which, if brought to full strength, would fulfill public order and civil defense missions. By the 1970s it had grown to 164 officers, added an eight-man air section posted to the King County International Airport, and was officially renamed the Washington State Guard.

== Mission and duties ==
=== State active duty and emergency support ===
The Washington State Guard supports the Washington Military Department as a uniformed public service organization for the benefit of the people of Washington. State Guard soldiers drill in a non-pay status, generally attending monthly drills used for training and coordination, and may perform additional work connected to their assignments, staff duties, projects, or recruiting. However, WSG soldiers can and have been called up to paid state active duty to support the Washington Military Department in a variety of missions across the state. When called to State Active Duty, members are considered state employees and are paid at the same rate of pay for their rank or grade as their regular Army or National Guard counterparts.

WSG members may serve anywhere in the state, often in their own communities. They have deployed in support of operations at Washington Army National Guard armories statewide, as well as at the state and county emergency operations centers, where they assist with logistics coordination and communications during state or federally declared disasters.

=== Recent activations ===
Recent examples of state active duty activations include the COVID-19 pandemic, the Travis Decker manhunt, the 2025 Pacific Northwest floods, following Washington's statewide emergency declaration during historic flooding, the 2026 Longview paper mill implosion, and the 2026 Spokane area fires and the Little Giant Fire.

== Organization ==
=== Current headquarters and detachments ===
Washington State Guard Detachments

The Washington State Guard is organized as a headquarters unit and five detachments. The WSG headquarters remains at Camp Murray, which also serves as the location of the Camp Murray Detachment. The other detachments are located in Longview, Marysville, Yakima, and Spokane.

=== Former brigade structure ===
Former brigade beret flashes

Washington State Guard, 1st Brigade

Washington State Guard, 2nd Brigade

The Washington State Guard was formerly organized into two brigades, located in Everett and Spokane, with a headquarters unit at Camp Murray in Tacoma.

=== Cadre status and mobilization ===
Despite the terms "brigade" and "battalion" formerly being used for the units comprising the State Guard, actual personnel strength is cadre only, meaning that while a skeleton organization exists, for real-world deployment the organization would have to be filled by the "calling out" of the unorganized militia of the state by the Governor.

== Personnel ==
=== Strength and membership ===
The Washington State Guard has an authorized cadre strength of 120 plus military personnel. Most WSG soldiers have prior military service, though some join directly from civilian life. Applicants are generally required to be United States citizens, residents of Washington, at least 18 years old, proficient in English, high school graduates or GED holders, and medically qualified. Current members of the active or reserve components of the United States Armed Forces are ineligible for appointment or enlistment in the Washington State Guard, as are convicted felons and individuals with certain disqualifying prior-service, legal, medical, or administrative conditions.

=== Service obligation and standards ===
All WSG members take an oath of allegiance to the United States and the State of Washington, and to obey the orders of the Governor of Washington and the officers appointed over them. Members serve for a period of not less than one year. Members are expected to attend monthly drills when required, notify their commander or supervisor if they cannot attend, wear the assigned uniform correctly, and conform to personal appearance and grooming standards under established Army regulations.

=== Training, pay and benefits ===
Officers and enlisted personnel train mostly on a voluntary basis without pay, unless authorized and/or mobilized by the Governor of Washington, at which time they are paid at the same rate an equivalent rank in the National Guard would be paid. Members are generally required to purchase and maintain their own uniforms and accessories. State Guard personnel, however, are eligible for free hunting licenses in Washington.

=== Ranks and appointments ===
Applicants are interviewed, evaluated, and enlisted or appointed to a rank based on the availability of an authorized billet, as well as prior military service, education, civilian occupation, and other factors established by law and regulation. Under Washington law, State Guard officer and enlisted personnel normally rank among themselves, but when called to State Active Duty, State Guard soldiers rank equally among State Active Duty members of the National Guard. All appointments, commissions, warrants, and enlistments are subject to recognition by the Governor of Washington through the Adjutant General.

=== Resignation ===
State Guard members may resign their enlistment or commission at any time, unless mobilized or serving in paid state active duty status.

== Legal basis ==
=== Constitutional authority ===
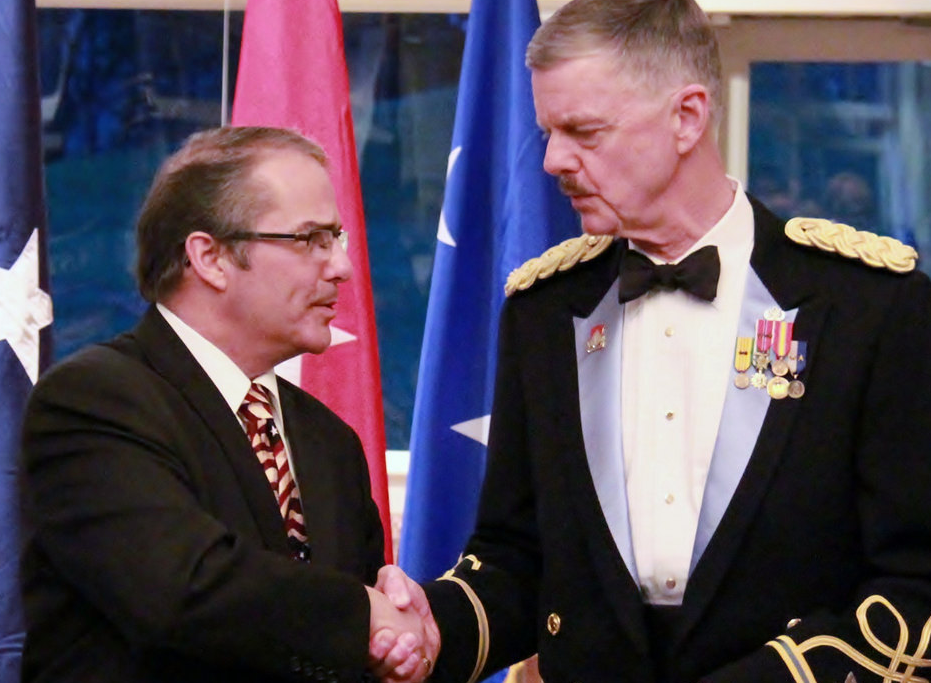
Col. Terry Larue, (Ret.) commander, Washington State Guard (right), shakes hands with Brad Owen, Lieutenant Governor of Washington, at the 2012 Washington State Guard dining out

Article X of the Washington State Constitution authorizes the Washington State Legislature to create a militia and empowers the Governor of Washington with the authority to commission its officers, while Article III of the constitution places the governor as "commander-in-chief of the military in the state except when they shall be called into the service of the United States".

=== Statutory authority ===
The legal status of the State Guard, specifically, is laid-out in Title 38 of the Revised Code of Washington (RCW) which establishes that the "militia of the state of Washington shall consist of ... all persons who are members of the national guard and the state guard."

=== Governor's authority ===
As a component of the militia, the State Guard is under the ultimate authority of the governor in his role as commander-in-chief of Washington's armed forces. Chapter eight, section 100 of Title 38 sets-out that the governor may "send militia of this state into areas of any bordering state adjacent to the common boundary as may be necessary to provide effective protection" while section 60 establishes that "whenever any portion of the militia is ordered to duty by the governor, the decision of the governor shall be final, incontrovertible, and unimpeachable". WSG members may be called to State Active Duty, may be given legal authority to command troops, and may participate in real-world missions when ordered to do so by the Governor through the Washington Military Department.

== Insignia ==
The Washington State Guard uses the shoulder sleeve insignia of the Washington Army National Guard Element, Joint Headquarters with the addition of the Washington State Guard tab. It also uses the distinctive unit insignia worn by Headquarters, Washington Army National Guard, and maintains a separate beret flash.

== See also ==
- Washington Naval Militia
- Washington Wing Civil Air Patrol
