= Spokane area fires =

2026 wildfire in the U.S. state of Washington

- Part of 2026 Washington wildfires
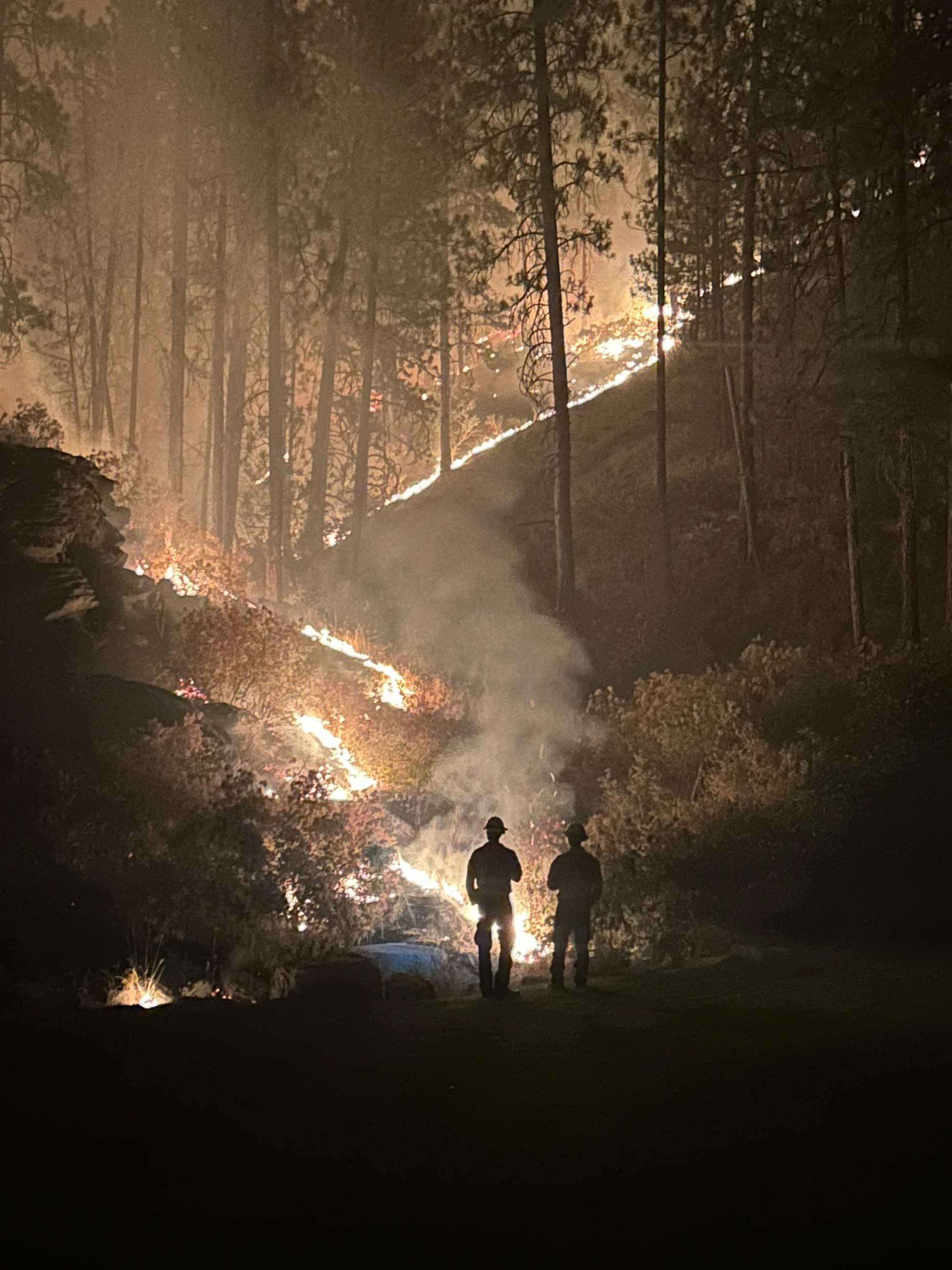
- Task Force Utah members on the Autumn Lane fire
- Date: August 1–19, 2026
- Location: Spokane County, Washington, U.S.
- Coordinates: 47.659°N 117.425°W

Statistics
- Status: Extinguished
- Perimeter: 100% (Old Trails, Autumn Lane, Fairview) contained as of August 19, 2026
- Burned area: 10,363 acres (16.2 sq mi; 41.9 km^{2}) cumulative

Impacts
- Evacuated: 65,000
- Structures destroyed: c. 846
- Cost: over $1 billion

Ignition
- Cause: Arson (Old Trails); Under investigation (Autumn Trail & Fairview)

Map
- Perimeter of 2026 Spokane Complex Fire (map data)
- Location within the United States Location within Washington (state)

The Spokane area fires were a group of three related wildfires in August 2026 in the northwest United States, located in the greater Spokane area of Spokane County, Washington. The fires were the Old Trails Fire, Autumn Lane Fire, and Fairview Fire, with the Old Trails Fire starting on Saturday, August 1, via arson.

The National Weather Service had issued a Red Flag Warning, with Washington state's first "particularly dangerous situation" flag, for regions of Eastern Washington including the Spokane area. Sustained winds, high temperatures, and low humidity allowed the three fires to all rapidly grow and spread in an eastern direction from the areas of ignition, with the Old Trails fire burning into neighborhoods of northwest Spokane.

== Background conditions ==
In the spring, the City of Spokane ran voluntary wildfire evacuation practice drills for selected neighborhoods. On May 3, 2025, the Thorpe and Grandview neighborhoods drilled, while the Latah Hangman plus Eagle Ridge neighborhoods drilled on April 25, 2026. Supported by multiple city agencies, the objectives included helping residents familiarize with evacuation routes, identifying obstacles during evacuation, and empowering quick and confident actions from citizens. The 2026 after action report for the drill conclusions detailed that while participants generally worked together and cooperated, evacuation was hindered by the number of egress routes available and formation of congestion. Additionally the notification systems, while adequate, worked best with redundancy between Wireless Emergency Alerts and the newly implemented Alert Spokane system. Enrollment was needed for the new system, while the public push notifications from the Wireless Emergency Alert system was only partially received in the drill area.

By late July, Washington state was already in one of the worst fire seasons on record, with a number of major wildfires burning across the state. By the last week of July over 1,000 fires had burned in the state, with an estimated 425,000 acres (664 sq mi; 1,720 km^{2}) of damaged lands, making it the most burnt acreage since the 2021 fire season. Twelve large fires encompassing 200,000 acres (310 sq mi; 810 km^{2}) were burning as of July 31.

In the preceding week an intense heat dome was present over a large portion of the western United States, bringing high temperatures and dry conditions to the Spokane area. In combination with the existing conditions, forecasts predicted the possibility of "historically strong winds" on August 1. At noon, Governor Bob Ferguson declared a state of emergency given the extreme conditions and large fires already burning statewide and the National Weather Service issuing its first-ever "particularly dangerous situation" Red Flag Warning for Central and Eastern Washington. The "particularly dangerous situation" flag is a rarely issued warning used by the National Weather Service for the most extreme fire condition scenarios. Based on the recommendations from the two spring wildfire drills, Spokane actively spread the emphasized the issued weather and fire warnings to alert as much of the population as possible.

== Fires ==
The Old Trails Fire, Autumn Lane Fire, and the related Fairview Fire have also been called the Spokane Complex Fire in media reports, with the California Interagency Incident Management Team 7 (CIIMT 7), a specialized federal unit, as the lead agency and headed by Tom Clemo. CIIMT 7 officially refer to the fires as the Spokane area fires, rather than a complex, and provide news releases detailing each fire. The fires received international coverage.

The large smoke plume seen from the nearby KOTX NEXRAD doppler radar.

The Old Trails Fire spread to just over 3,500 acres (5.5 sq mi; 14 km^{2}) on August 1, with the rapid growth driven by sustained winds of 35–40 mph (56–64 km/h).

The Autumn Lane brush fire northwest of Spokane by the afternoon of Monday, August 3, had burned more than 5,600 acres (8.8 sq mi; 23 km^{2}) on Spokane and Stevens County. Two days later, firefighters estimated that both the Old Trails fire and the Autumn Lane were 13% contained.

In the northeastern area of Spokane, the Fairview Fire moved through several neighborhoods and progressed towards Mead. The fire burned though the Pleasant Valley Stables, home to the Showbiz Riding School, through no horses were lost to the fire. The area between the fire perimeter and Mead is classified as a wildland–urban interface containing ladder fuels such as long grass and low tree limbs providing routes for fires to transition from low grass burns into the tree tops.

== Progression ==
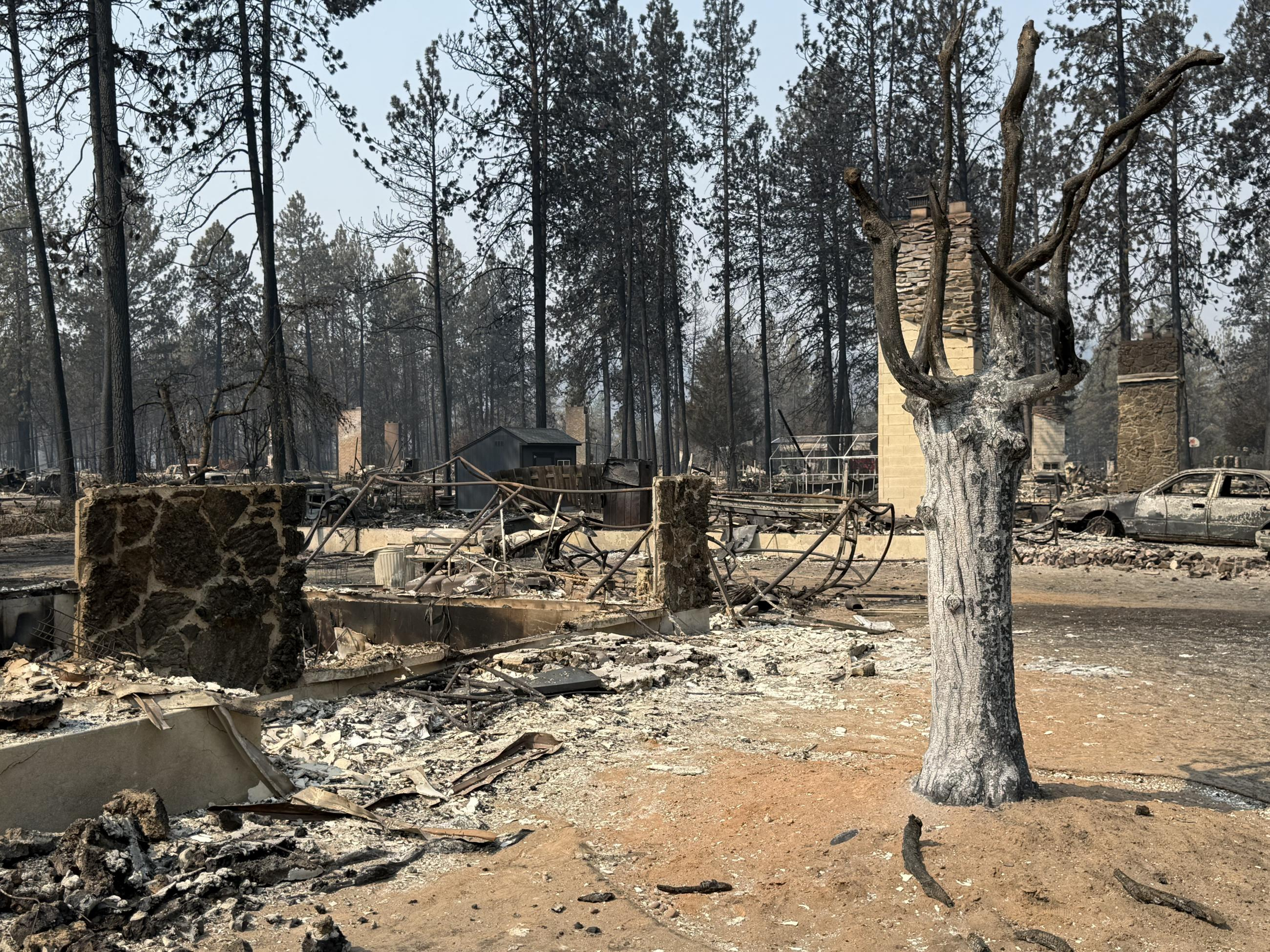
Burned neighborhood in the Old Trails Fire zone

The Old Trails fire started west of Spokane around 12 p.m. PDT on August 1 near the city of Airway Heights. Given the abundance of fuel and winds up to 40 mph (64 km/h), the fire grew rapidly and jumped the Spokane River. At 3:30 p.m., a Level 3 (mandatory) evacuation was issued in Spokane affecting thousands of people. By 5:20 p.m., multiple homes were fully involved, and explosions occurred in the Indian Trail Neighborhood. 40,000 people in Spokane were without power, many as a precautionary measure.

As of early morning on Sunday, August 2, 640 structures were confirmed impacted, mostly in Spokane proper, and the VA hospital had been evacuated.

By late Monday afternoon, August 3, the Autumn Lane fire had grown to 1,000 acres (400 ha) to become the single largest fire of the group. 65,000 people had been evacuated from Spokane and environs, 700 homes had been confirmed destroyed, and some 900 firefighters were working the Spokane fires; over 5,000 were responding to 15 fires throughout the state. In total the Spokane fires had burned 1.5 square miles (3.9 km^{2}).

By the morning of Friday, August 7, perimeters had been partially established around all three fires, with the incident management team reporting 37% around the Autumn Lane Fire, 31% on the Fairview fire, and 23% for the Old Trails Fire. They also placed the estimated total number of structures destroyed at 846. The three fires had over 1,500 personnel assigned to them including over 100 federal, state, and local organizations from across 24 states The calm weather over on August 6 resulted in no new growth on any of the fires, and allowed crews to rapidly build the fire perimeters. Crews were also deployed to the areas directly perimeter adjacent to conduct "aggressive" mop-up operations, dealing with hot-spots, and areas at risk of flair-ups. This was in preparation for critical fire weather with a red flag warning issued for August 7-8.

Due to the increasing size of the command and unit numbers, the command post was formally moved to the Spokane County Fair and Expo Center fairgrounds, which were also open for livestock evacuees and RVs for families with animals or pets. Two major evacuation shelters were in operation, in the Spokane Convention Center within Spokane county and at Jenkins High School in Chewelah for Stevens County.

== Evacuation and closures ==
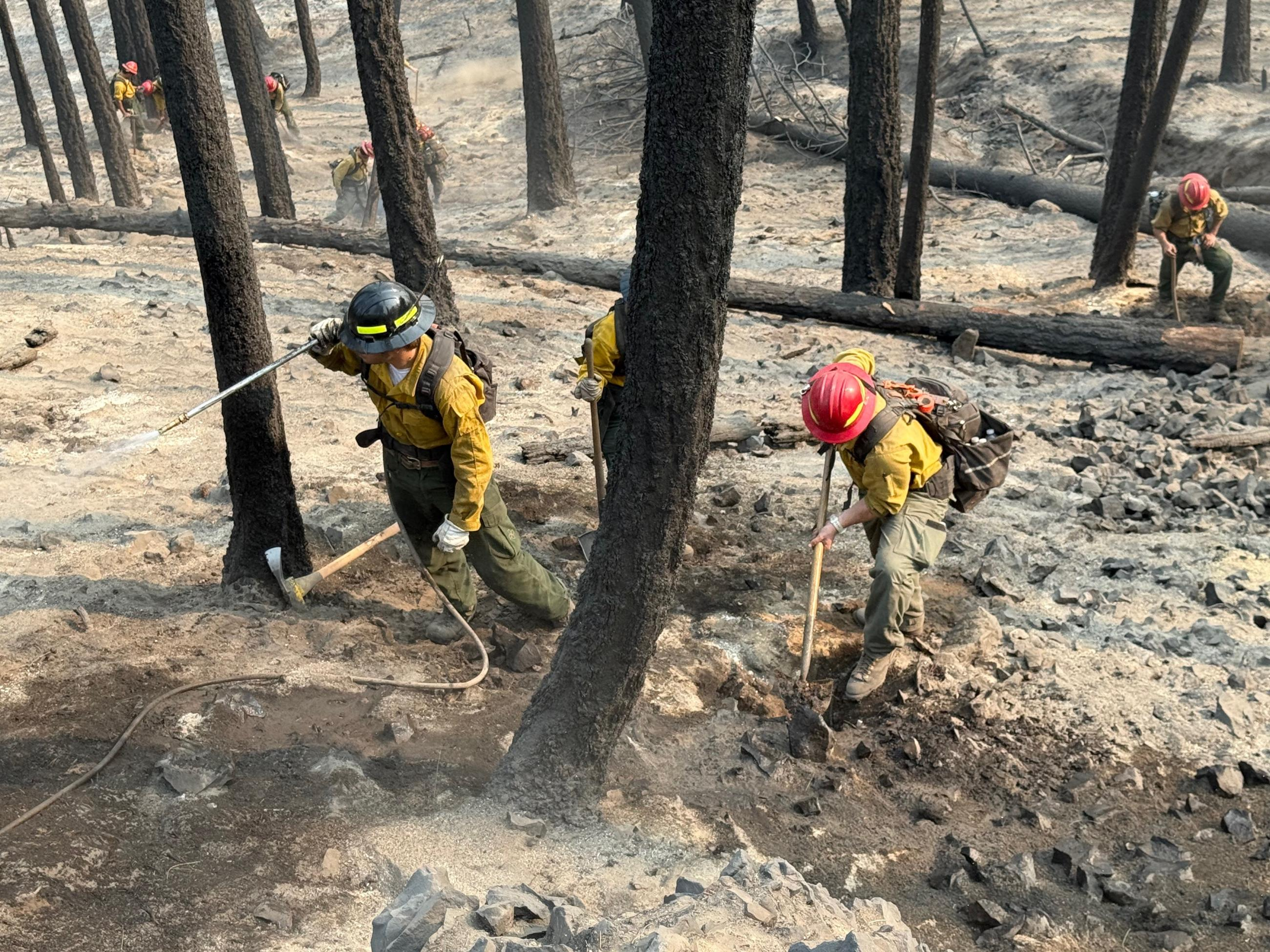
Mop-up crew working in the Fairview burn

Following lessons from the spring evacuation drills, National Guard and State Guard troops, as well as police officers were immediately deployed to the areas in danger, spreading the evacuation notice in person, directing traffic, and opening emergency shelters outside the impacted areas. The Spokane Veterans Health Administration hospital and its Spokane satellite facilities were evacuated on August 1. Based on the forewarning from the city, the hospital had readied staff and patients for evacuation to other facilities or to shelters. The same day, people sheltering at Spokane Falls Community College were moved to the Spokane Convention Center when power was lost. Fairchild Air Force Base issued a "limited evacuation order for military personnel, civilian employees and families" who were in designated evacuation zones. On August 3, 2026, Spokane Superior, District and Municipal Courts issued an emergency order to shut down certain court operations and continue jury trials to August 10. Mead High School and other middle and elementary schools in Mead School District were evacuated.

== Aftermath ==
Due to the nature of an urban fire like this, a number of hazardous materials are suspected to be present in the burn zones and are likely to be a danger to anyone coming in contact with them. Incident command deployed a number of hazardous materials specialists into the Level 3 evacuation zones on August 7. The goal was to perform comprehensive assessment of the materials within the zones.

== Suspect ==
On August 3, after initial questioning and further investigation, Aaron Farinacci was arrested and charged with first-degree arson. The probable cause affidavit filed in Spokane County Superior Court says that the fire investigator "determined the cause of the fire was consistent with an open flame to vegetation such as would be expected by a lighter or a match." His bail, set at $1,000,000, was later raised to $2,000,000. On August 6, Farinacci confessed to setting more than 25 fires since 2025, regarding fire as "beautiful", "powerful", and a means of "rebirth". He also said that he had researched the circumstances which would cause maximum damage and studied serial arsonist John Leonard Orr. Farinacci had begun his arson near his apartment complex after the May 2026 birth of his son lead to "life issues" and his smoking marijuana. The latter also provided a reason for his carrying a lighter. He was, as one detective who interviewed noted, calm and intelligent, detailed, and "knowledgeable about fire, winds, and fire warning protocol." He told investigators he specifically waited for a hot and windy day to set the fires.

In 2012, Farinacci was charged with the 2010 murder of his adoptive father. He ultimately pleaded guilty to manslaughter and aggravated assault and was sentenced to 12 years in prison. He was released in December 2020.

Panorama of the Old Trails Fire (middle left) and Fairview Fire (middle) viewed from near Spokane Valley August 1
