= Chelan Hills Fire =

2026 wildfire in the U.S. state of Washington

- Part of the 2026 Washington wildfires
- The Chelan Hills Fire moving into McNeil Canyon from a firefighter's perspective.
- Date: July 4, 2026 – July 10
- Location: Douglas County, Washington, United States

Statistics
- Burned area: 9,861 acres (3,991 ha; 15.408 sq mi)

Impacts
- Deaths: 1 civilian
- Injuries: 0
- Evacuated: Roughly 500
- Structures destroyed: >100
- Cost: ≥$9.1 million (2026 USD)

Ignition
- Cause: 4 Suspects arrested for allegedly igniting fire by shooting Roman Candles out of the back of a moving pickup truck

The Chelan Hills Fire was a destructive wildfire that burned in the U.S. state of Washington. The fire ignited on July 4, 2026 and rapidly spread one mile (1.6 km) north of Orondo. The fire destroyed at least 100 structures and killed one person. The fire burned 9,862 acres (3,991 ha) and reached 100% containment on July 10.

== Cause ==
The Chelan Hills Fire was reported on July 4th, at 12:05 am Pacific Daylight Time. While the exact cause is under investigation, officials believe the fire is human–caused. and a criminal investigation is underway.2 have been charged with arson. On September 18th, 2026, The Chronicle reported that 3 additional suspects had been arrested in connection with the Chelan Hills Fire. The suspects were arrested by the Douglas County Sheriff's Office, in conjunction with the US Marshals Service. Charges listed on the arrest warrants include manslaughter, arson, assault, and malicious mischief.

Two suspects are still outstanding.

== Progression ==
Wildland firefighters attempt to construct line around the fire before it reaches the homes in McNeil Canyon.

Crews began responding at 12:29 am. The fire was running uphill and threatened structures. A second alarm was requested and level three evacuations (Note: In Washington, there are three evacuation levels. Level one means to prepare to evacuate, level two means to be ready to evacuate with little to no notice, and level three means to leave the area immediately.) were ordered. U.S. 97 was closed from mileposts 232 to 235. The fire continued spreading throughout the night and more evacuations were ordered, growing to an estimated size of 2,000 acres (810 ha) that morning. The fire spread rapidly along the road, visible from the nearby Beebe Bridge Park. Helicopters dropped water on the fire while firefighters from the local Chelan handcrew attempted to construct line around the fire.

As the fire increased in size, efforts shifted to structure protection. Two handcrews were sent into McNeil Canyon and began structure prep efforts. As they worked, fire came over the ridgeline into the canyon and ran at the houses being protected. At 3:30pm, the wildland firefighters packed all their gear and evacuated down the road, which was at that point also being hit by the fire. They drove through the heat and flames and were able to make it to a safety zone, where they burnt out to create a larger safe area.

The fire jumped McNeil Canyon and prompted evacuations for all residents in the area. An evacuation center opened at Chelan Elementary School. The Chelan Hills Fire reached 3,000 acres (1,200 ha) by 2 pm and 5,000 acres (2,000 ha) by 5 pm. Terrain and visibility conditions were impacting suppression efforts and several structures were destroyed. A Washington State Department of Natural Resources (DNR) employee stated the fire was around 10,000 acres (4,000 ha) by 10 pm. The fire was estimated to have grown to 15,000 acres (6,100 ha) the morning of July 5. Officials reported it was likely over 100 structures had been destroyed, and U.S. 97 was reopened. The size was revised to an estimated 10,000 acres (4,000 ha) and crews began damage assessments.

On July 6, fire activity was primarily wind–driven, with short–range spotting. The size was lowered to 9,756 acres (3,948 ha) and containment increased to 20% that night. Power was restored to several areas near the Chelan Hills Fire on July 7. A red flag warning was issued that day. 185 personnel were responding. Containment increased to 50%. Another red flag warning was in effect the next day. The Red Cross placed the evacuation shelter on standby. Fire crews achieved 75% containment. The Douglas County Sheriff's Office (DCSO) downgraded several level three evacuations to level two on July 9. Crews primarily conducted repair work on areas impacted by suppression, and DCSO employees continued damage assessments. The Chelan Hills Fire was fully contained on July 10 at a finalized size of 9,861 acres (3,991 ha).

On September 2, 2026 Michael Yakimov was arrested and charged with first-degree manslaughter, first-degree arson, first-degree malicious mischief and six counts of third-degree assault by the Douglas County District Attorney. Yakimov was accused of firing illegal aerial fireworks on the back of a truck traveling which ignited grass that started the fire while north on U.S. Highway 97 after midnight of July 4th.

== Effects ==
Estimates place the structure toll of the Chelan Hills Fire at 100, roughly 75% of the structures in the burn area. Evacuations were ordered in McNeil Canyon and along the Columbia River. The cost of the fire is at least $9.1 million 2026 USD. Roughly 500 people were evacuated. U.S. 97 was closed most of July 4 and McNeil Canyon Road remains closed. One local business was reportedly overwhelmed when firefighters ordered 150 pizzas. One civilian fatality was reported when human remains were found in a pickup truck that slid off the road and burned. The person was previously reported missing. Three firefighters were injured when the fire engine was overrun by flames.

== Growth and containment table ==
Fire containment status Gray: contained; Red: active; %: percent contained;
Date	Area burned	Containment
July 4	9,210 acres (3,730 ha)	
July 5	9,735 acres (3,940 ha)	
July 6	9,735 acres (3,940 ha)	
July 7	9,861 acres (3,991 ha)	
July 8	9,861 acres (3,991 ha)	
July 9	9,861 acres (3,991 ha)	
July 10	9,861 acres (3,991 ha)	

== See also ==
- 2026 Washington wildfires
- Upriver Fire
