= Fire season =

Fire season is dry season in areas with sufficient plantlife to be at risk for bushfires or wildfires.

Fire Season may also refer to:

- Fire Season, a science fiction novel by author David Weber
