= Kaiser Canyon Fire =

2026 wildfire in the U.S. state of Washington

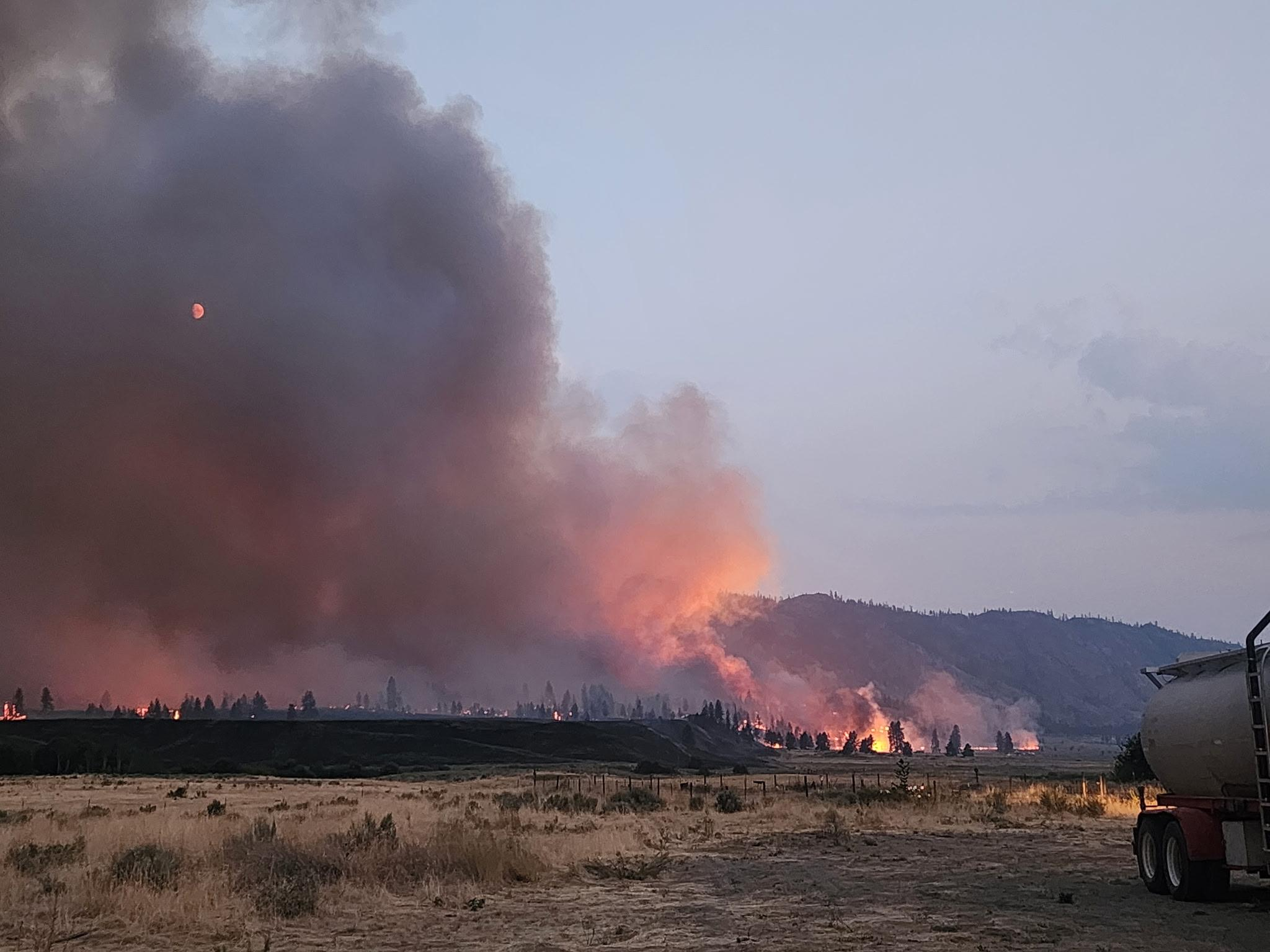
- Kaiser Canyon Fire at dusk, July 23, 2026
- Date: July 16–September 6, 2026 –
- Location: Nespelem, Washington, Okanogan County, Washington US

Statistics
- Status: Extinguished
- Burned area: 138,213 acres (55,933 ha)

Ignition
- Cause: Lightning

Kaiser Canyon Fire was an wildfire in Okanogan County, Washington. It was sparked by lightning at 6 am on July 16, 2026, a mile from Nespelem, and spread rapidly due to dry, hot, and windy conditions. It surrounded Nespelem by July 19, and by July 24 had grown to over 100,000 acres (40,000 ha). The Colville Indian Reservation was affected by the fire. The town of Nespelem was put under level 3 evacuation and State Route 155 was closed.

== Structural damage ==
Multiple structures were destroyed, including homes and a historic Indian Shaker Church building.
