= Red flag warning =

Term used by meteorologists indicating conditions favorable for wildfire development

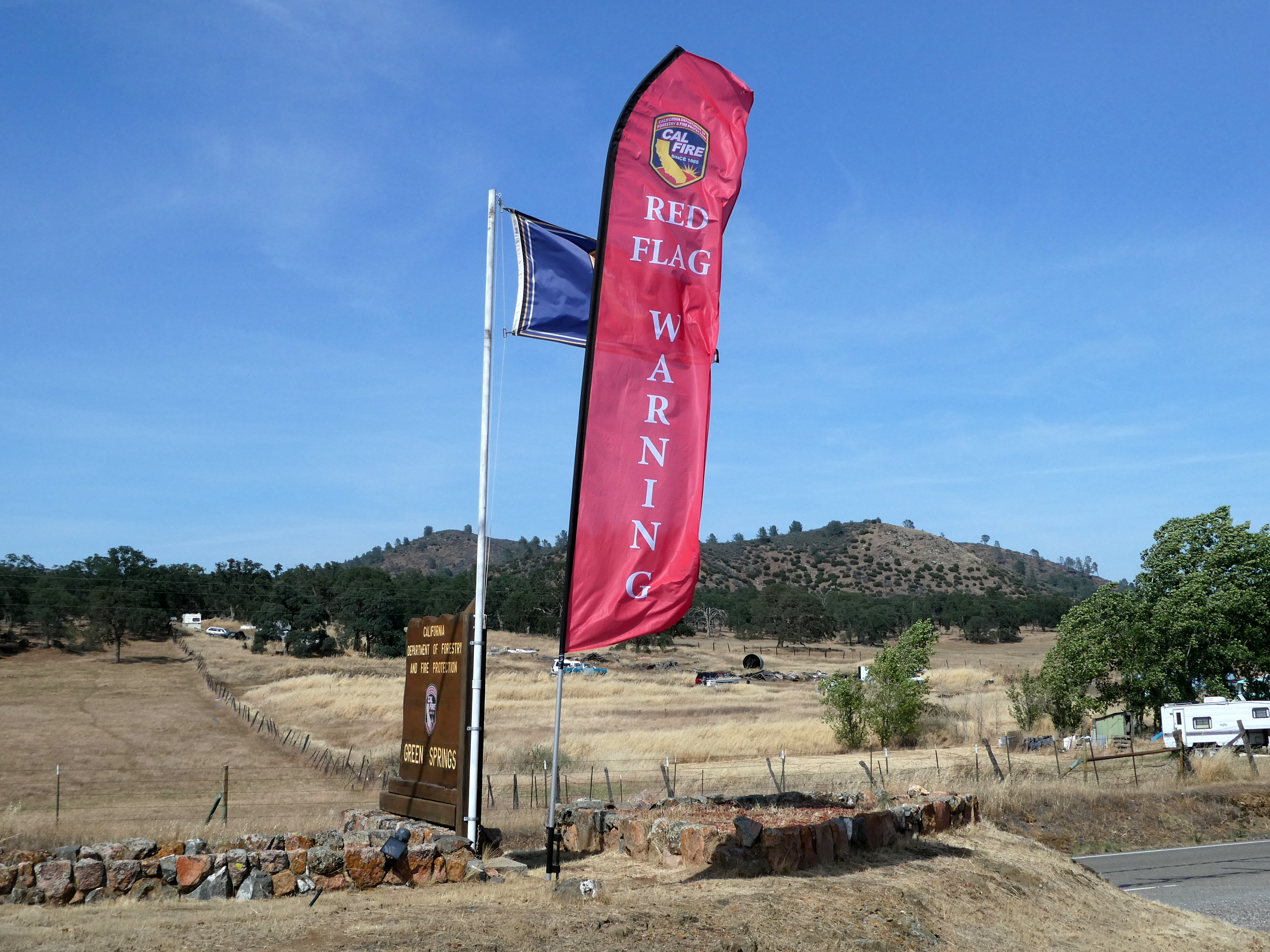
A banner indicating a red flag warning, flown at a CAL Fire station in 2022

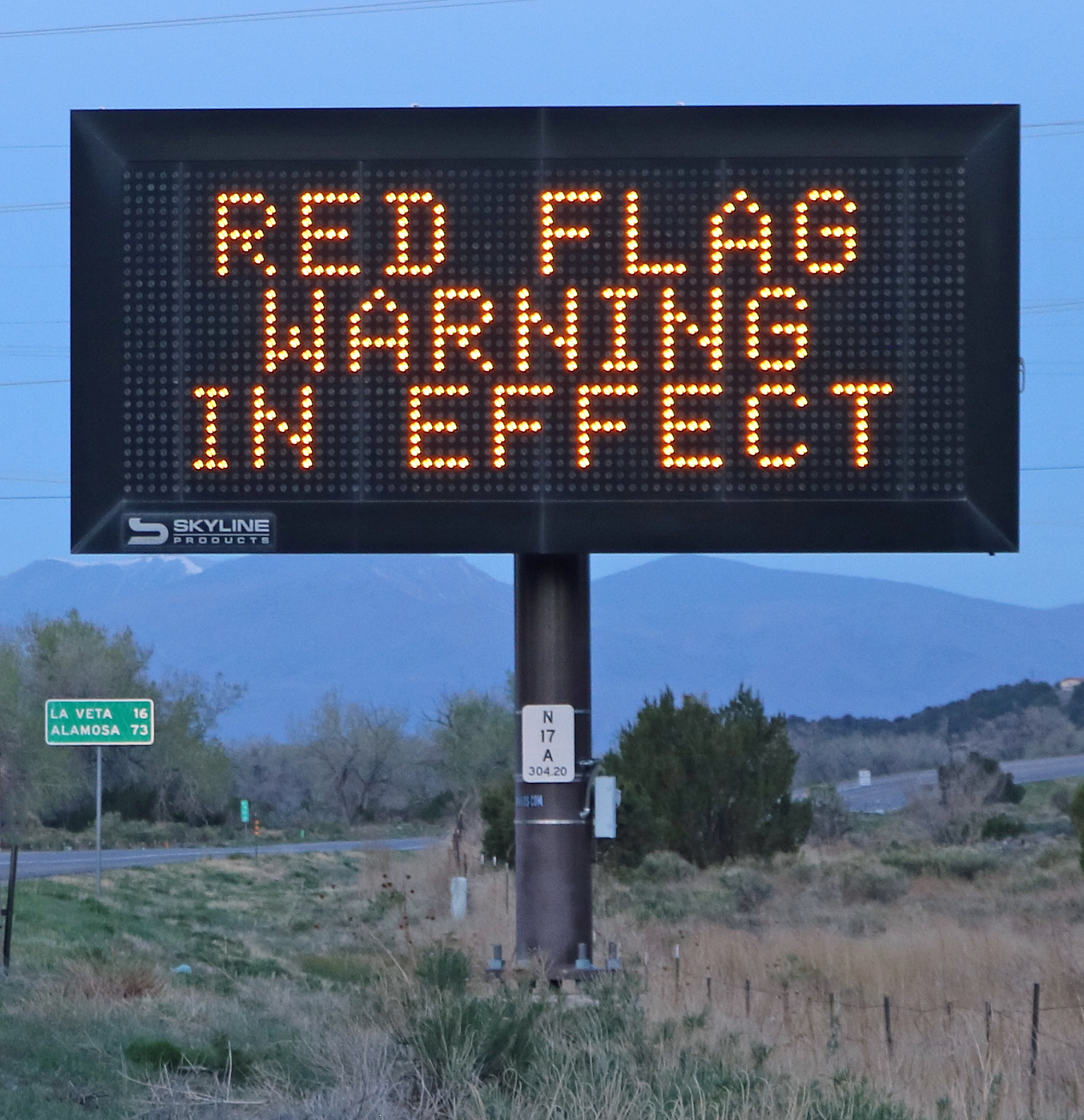
Road sign displaying red flag warning along U.S. Highway 160 in Walsenburg, Colorado.

A red flag warning is a forecast warning issued by the National Weather Service (NWS) in the United States to inform the public, firefighters, and land management agencies that conditions are ideal for wildfire combustion, and rapid spread. It is a form of emergency alert.

== Criteria ==
Red flag warnings are associated with drought conditions, very low humidity, high or erratic winds, and the possibility of lightning.

The weather criteria for fire weather watches and red flag warnings vary with each Weather Service office’s warning area based on the local vegetation type, topography, and distance from major water sources. They usually include the daily vegetation moisture content calculations, expected afternoon high temperature, afternoon minimum relative humidity, and daytime wind speed.

== Responses ==
Firefighting agencies often respond to such a warning by altering their staffing and equipment resources dramatically. To the public, the warning means high fire danger with increased probability of a quickly spreading vegetation fire in the area within 24 hours.

Outdoor burning bans may also be proclaimed by local law and fire agencies based on red flag warnings, for both the general public and land management officials. A fire weather warning gives extra guidance to land management officials to refrain from controlled burns.

== Related warnings ==
In October 2019, the National Weather Service introduced a variant to denote even more dangerous conditions: extreme red flag warning. Analogous to the particularly dangerous situation (PDS) wording on a high-end severe weather warning or watch, this means that conditions for fire growth and behavior are extremely dangerous due to a combination of strong winds, very low humidity, long duration, and very dry fuels. It was used for the first time on October 29, 2019.

A related but less imminent forecast may include a fire weather watch, which is issued to alert fire and land management agencies to the possibility that Red Flag conditions may exist beyond the first forecast period (12 hours). The watch is issued generally 12 to 48 hours in advance of the expected conditions, but can be issued up to 72 hours in advance if the NWS agency is reasonably confident. The term “Fire Weather Watch” is headlined in the routine forecast and issued as a product, similar to the other primary fire warning terms. That watch then remains in effect until it expires, is canceled, or upgraded to a red flag warning.

== See also ==
- Australian Fire Danger Rating System (Australia)
- Severe weather terminology (Canada)
