= Upriver Fire =

2026 wildfire in the U.S. state of Washington

- Part of the 2026 Washington wildfires
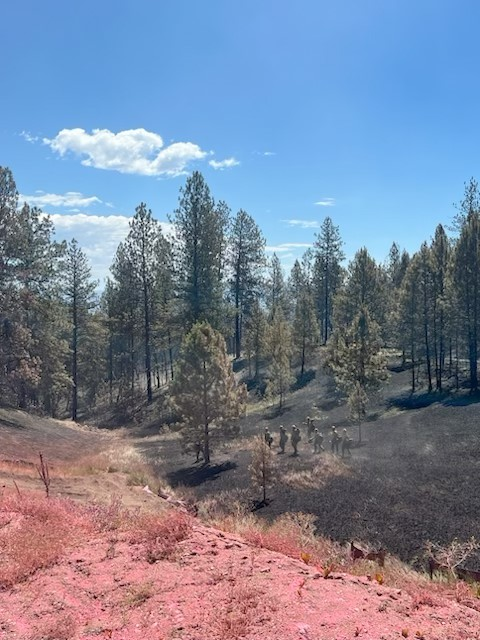
- Fire retardant drop on the Upriver Fire, seen on June 17
- Date: June 16, 2026 – June 24
- Location: Spokane, Spokane County, Washington

Statistics
- Perimeter: 100% contained
- Burned area: 213 acres (86 ha; 0.333 sq mi)

Impacts
- Deaths: 1 (Note: Human remains have been found inside a burned house. Detectives and fire investigators are working to find the cause of the death but believe it is related to a resident who did not evacuate.)
- Injuries: 0
- Missing people: 1
- Evacuated: 12,000
- Structures destroyed: 14 primary, 4 outbuildings destroyed

Ignition
- Cause: Human (Note: Specifics not released.)

Map
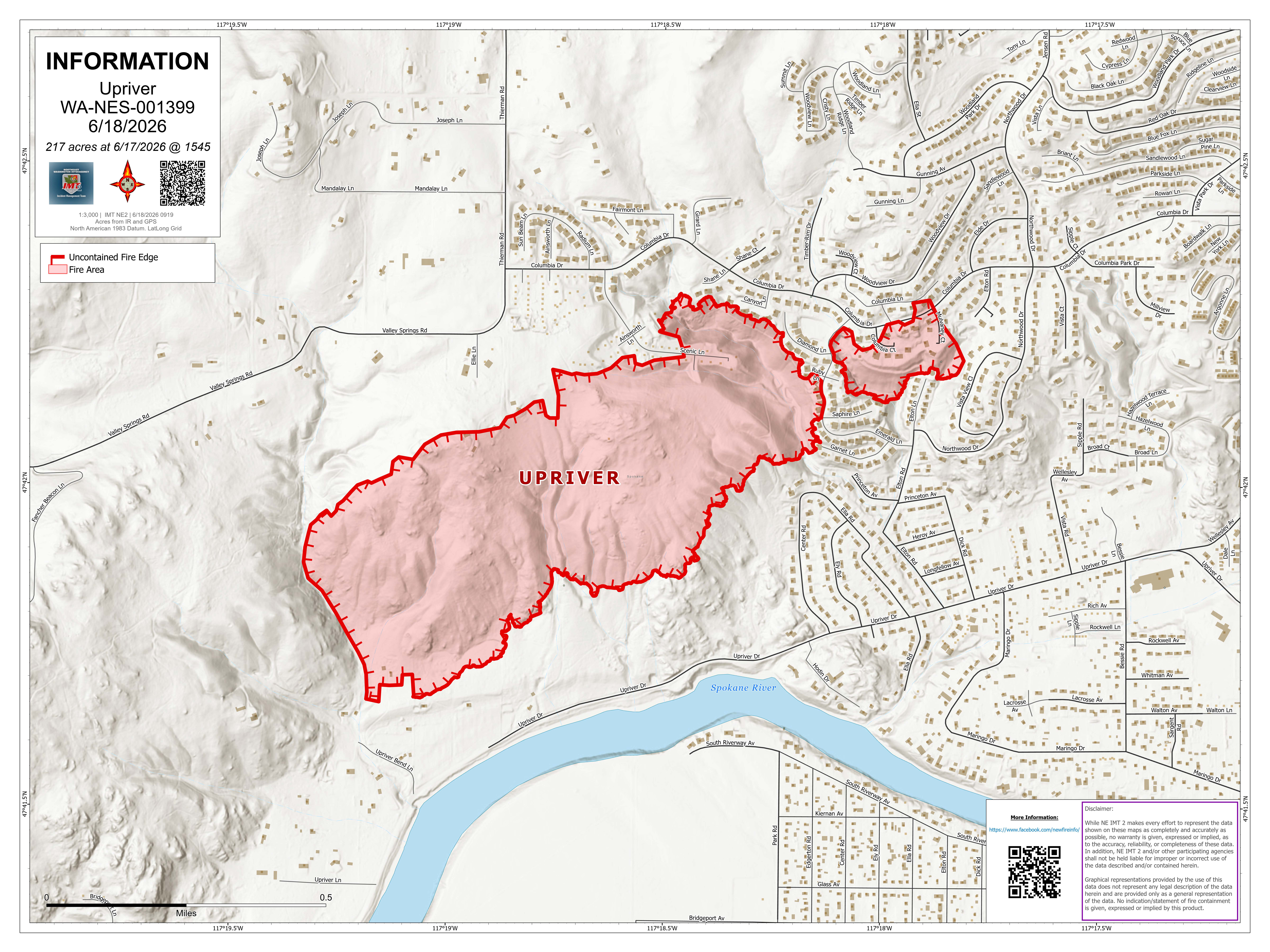
- Perimeter map of the Upriver Fire on June 18

The Upriver Fire was a fast-moving, destructive wildfire that burned in Spokane, Washington, United States. The fire ignited on June 16, 2026 near Camp Sekani of human origin and rapidly spread due to a combination of high temperatures, low humidity levels, and gusty winds. The fire reached 100% containment on June 24 and destroyed fourteen primary and four secondary structures.

== Cause ==
The Upriver Fire was first reported on June 16 around 12:24 pm at 1 acre (0.40 ha). The Washington State Department of Natural Resources (DNR) has reported the fire is human-caused, the specifics of which have not been publicly released.

== Progression ==
The Upriver Fire was rapidly upgraded to a second and third alarm as it rapidly spread towards structures. Level Three "Go Now" evacuation orders were requested around 12:58 pm with Level Two "Get Set" orders for a larger area, and officials contacted 1,500 people regarding evacuations, including going door-to-door for 400 people. By 1:50 pm, the DNR reported the fire was 50 acres (20 ha) large and Spokane Valley Fire District #9 reported it was 150 acres (61 ha). The Upriver Fire was then estimated at 292 acres (118 ha) by the DNR air team at 2:49 pm. Around 2:55 the Level Three evacuation zone was expanded to include the area previously under Level Two orders. The DNR estimated the fire to be 352 acres (142 ha) at 3:42 pm. Firefighters were heavily using both aerial and ground tools to combat the fire. By 4:25 pm, 500 residential structures were threatened and at least five had been destroyed. There was uncertainty on the size and structure toll of the fire, but the size was estimated to be 250 acres (100 ha) by 10 pm and 10% contained. Evacuations had been extended from the Spokane River in the south to Bigelow Gulch Road north and Thierman Road marking the western boundary to Argonne Road in the east. An evacuation center was opened at Spokane Valley United Methodist Church. An infrared flight conducted on June 17 revealed strong wind caused spotting as wind carried embers from the main body across a ridgeline.

Governor Bob Ferguson requested a fire management assistance declaration from the Federal Emergency Management Agency (FEMA). The fire had destroyed multiple residential structures. Roadblocks had been staffed overnight. Spokane County Sheriff John Nowels reported 15 structures had been destroyed. 300 personnel were responding to the fire and "multiple other homes have been affected". One person was reported missing. Officials know where to search for the person but are restrained by unsafe conditions in the area. With limitaitons, residents were allowed to retrieve valuable belongings from their home that afternoon. The fire size was downgraded to 217 acres (88 ha). At 9 pm that night, evacuations were reduced, with level three (Note: In Washington, there are three evacuation levels. Level one means to prepare to evacuate, level two means to be ready to evacuate with little to no notice, and level three means to leave the area immediately.) evacuations remaining only near the fire line and evacuations being downgraded to level 2 elsewhere. Fire activity did not increase overnight and the DNR reported on June 18 the Upriver Fire would be unlikely to cross fire lines.

Recovery resources were available on June 18 from 4 to 7 pm at Pasadena Park Church of the Nazerene. Evacuations remained in place. The Upriver Fire was revised to a size of 213 acres (86 ha) and containment increased to 39%. Minor smoldering occurred overnight into June 19 with crews mostly mopping up. Recovery resources were available from 9 am to 4 pm. Evacuations had been downgraded with level two evacuations being lifted entirely and level three evacuations were downgraded to level one. On June 20, officials stated smoke could be visible from isolated areas within the fire's perimeter. Disaster recovery resources were available from 9 am to 4 pm. Fire activity was minimal and crews were still mostly focusing on mop-up and patrolling the perimeter. Crews achieved 75% containment on June 21 and were working to locate smoldering material. Officials prepared to return management to local agencies. Containment increased to 85% that evening.

The Upriver Fire reached 100% containment on June 24.

== Effects ==
14 residential structures and four outbuildings have been destroyed by the Upriver Fire. One person was reported missing by family members; initially fire crews could not enter the area due to hazardous conditions. Likely human remains were found in a burned home of a citizen "who had refused to evacuate", according to the Spokane County Sheriff's Office. The remains were found after a family member requested a welfare check. As of June 2026, medical examiners were working to find the cause of death. Roughly 12,000 people were under evacuation orders, and residents were warned of potential hazards including smoldering stumps and weakened trees. Local restaurants were reportedly overwhelmed by evacuees.

== Growth and containment table ==
Fire containment status Gray: contained; Red: active; %: percent contained;
Date	Area burned	Personnel	Containment
June 16	222 acres (90 ha)	Unknown	
June 17	222 acres (90 ha)	>300	
June 18	217 acres (88 ha) (Note: Due to more accurate mapping.)	348	
June 19	213 acres (86 ha)	348	
June 20	213 acres (86 ha)	303	
June 21	213 acres (86 ha)	174	
June 22	213 acres (86 ha)	Unknown	
June 23	213 acres (86 ha)	Unknown	
June 24	213 acres (86 ha)	Unknown	

== See also ==
- 2026 Washington wildfires
