= List of wilderness study areas =

This is a list of some of the wilderness study areas (WSA) in the United States as of January 2026. Wilderness study areas are designated lands that meet criteria of the Wilderness Act and are managed as wilderness by their parent agency, pending final determination by Congress.

== Bureau of Land Management wilderness study areas ==
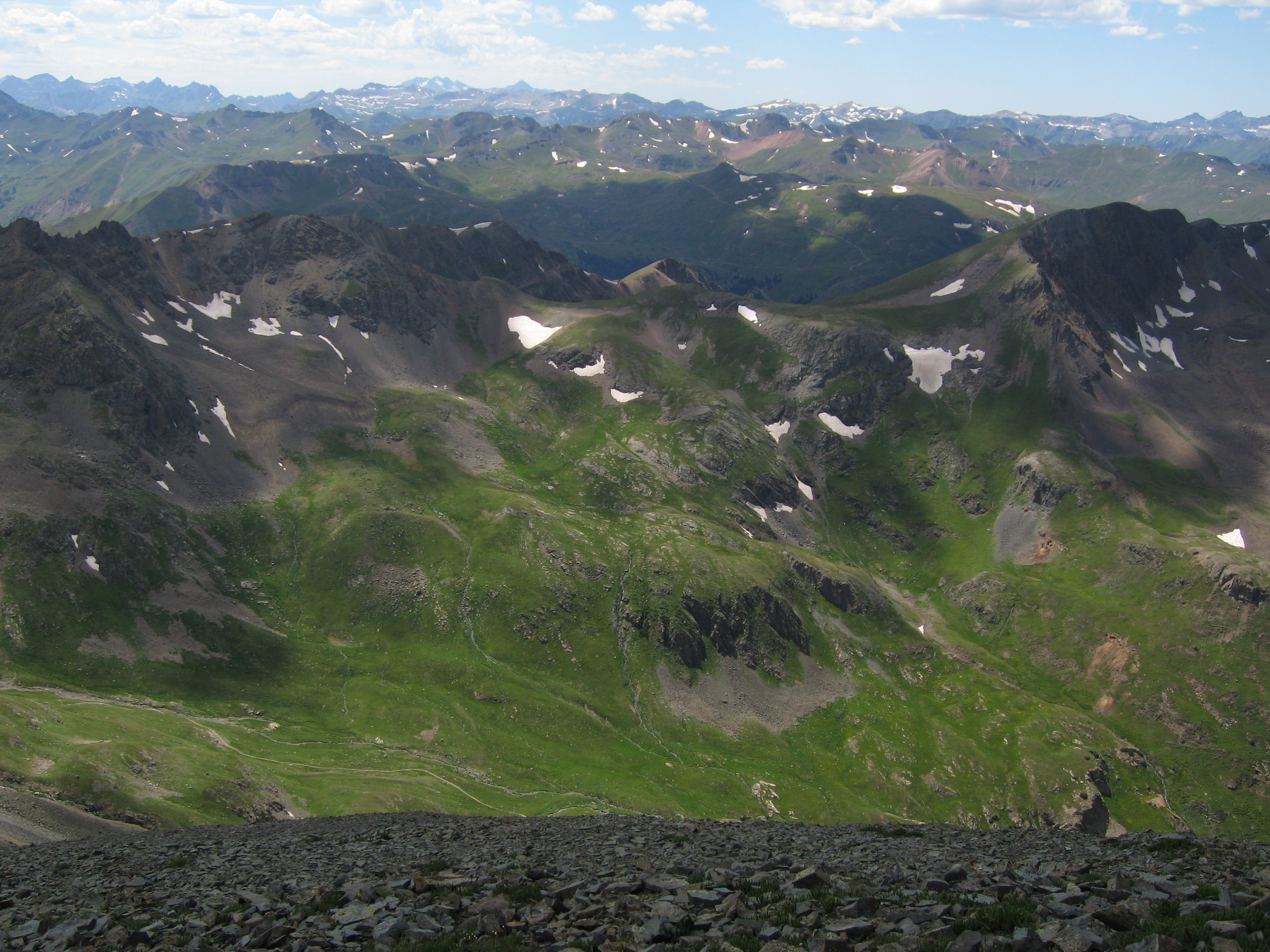
Handies Peak WSA, near Lake City, Colorado

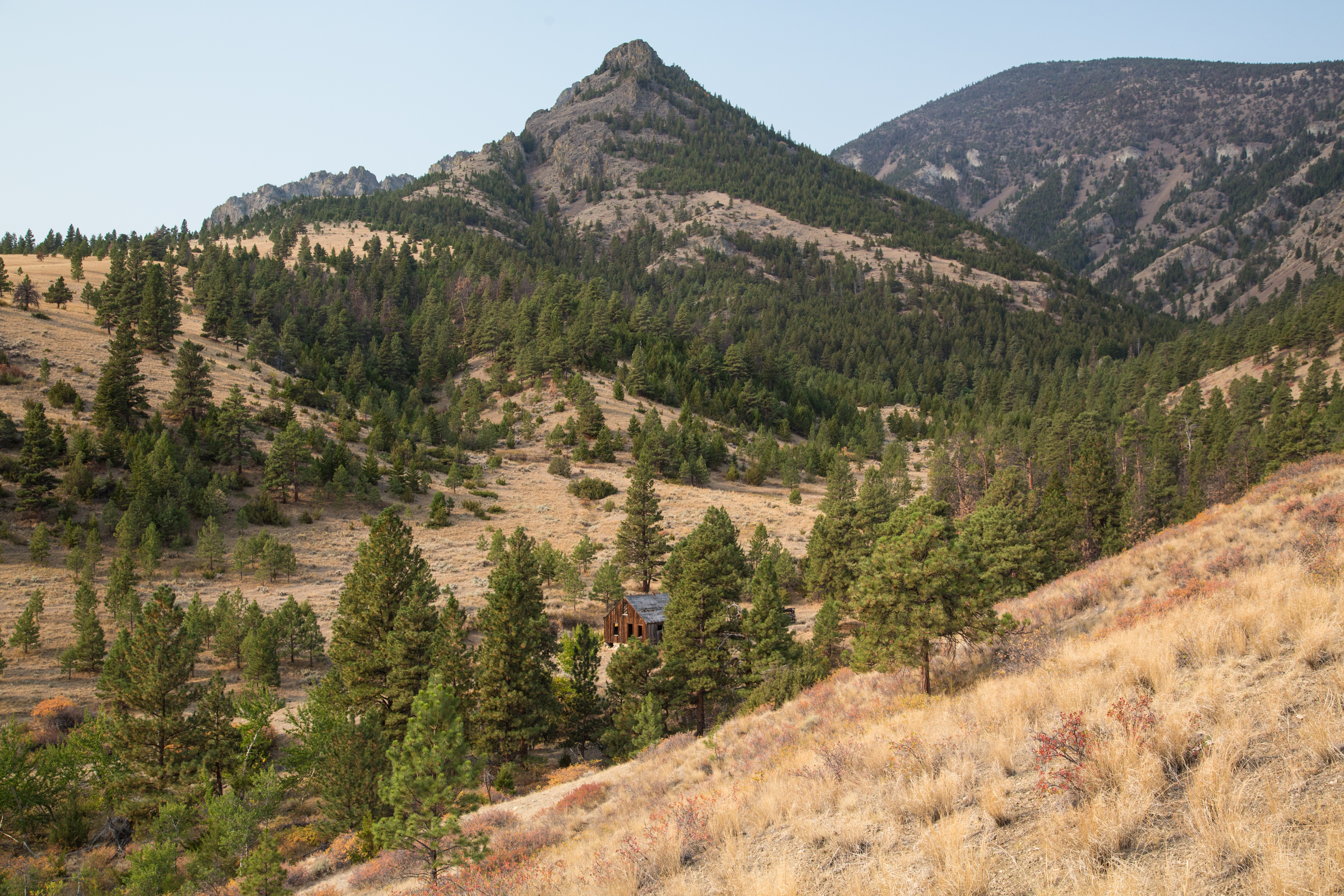
Sleeping Giant WSA, near Helena, Montana

These areas are administered as part of the National Conservation Lands managed by the Bureau of Land Management.

=== States with BLM wilderness study areas ===
States with Wilderness Study Areas
State	Number of areas	Total area
Alaska	1	260,000 acres (1,100 km^{2})
Arizona	2	63,930 acres (258.7 km^{2})
California	59	503,539 acres (2,037.75 km^{2})
Colorado	53	546,969 acres (2,213.51 km^{2})
Idaho	40	544,619 acres (2,203.99 km^{2})
Montana	35	435,084 acres (1,760.72 km^{2})
Nevada	56	2,018,717 acres (8,169.46 km^{2})
New Mexico	48	725,006 acres (2,934.00 km^{2})
Oregon	87	2,645,103 acres (10,704.35 km^{2})
Utah	77	2,795,574 acres (11,313.29 km^{2})
Washington	1	5,554 acres (22.48 km^{2})
Wyoming	42	574,401 acres (2,324.52 km^{2})
Total	487*	11,118,496 acres (44,994.96 km^{2})

- There are some wilderness study areas that cross state boundaries

=== BLM wilderness study areas ===
Wilderness study areas
State	Name	Area	Recommendation date
Alaska	Central Arctic Management Area	260,000 acres (1,100 km^{2})	NA
Arizona	Baker Canyon	4,812 acres (19.47 km^{2})	NA
Arizona	Cactus Plain	59,118 acres (239.24 km^{2})	June 2005
California	Bear Canyon	318 acres (1.29 km^{2})	January 1979
California	Bear Mountain	4,023 acres (16.28 km^{2})	January 1979
California	Beauty Mountain	3,830 acres (15.5 km^{2})	July 1991
California	Big Butte	1,500 acres (6.1 km^{2})	July 1991
California	Bitterbrush	640 acres (2.6 km^{2})	July 1991
California	Black Mountain	150 acres (0.61 km^{2})	NA
California	Bodie	16,482 acres (66.70 km^{2})	July 1991
California	Bodie Mountain	23,934 acres (96.86 km^{2})	July 1991
California	Buffalo Hills	856 acres (3.46 km^{2})	July 1991
California	Caliente Mountain	17,590 acres (71.2 km^{2})	July 1991
California	Carrizo Gorge	300 acres (1.2 km^{2})	July 1991
California	Carson Iceberg	550 acres (2.2 km^{2})	July 1991
California	Casa Diablo	5,325 acres (21.55 km^{2})	July 1991
California	Cerro Gordo	5,800 acres (23 km^{2})	July 1991
California	Chidago Canyon	19,702 acres (79.73 km^{2})	July 1991
California	Crater Mountain	7,069 acres (28.61 km^{2})	July 1991
California	Dry Valley Rim	18,131 acres (73.37 km^{2})	July 1991
California	Eden Valley	6,166 acres (24.95 km^{2})	July 1991
California	Excelsior	9,383 acres (37.97 km^{2})	July 1991
California	Fish Slough	14,700 acres (59 km^{2})	July 1991
California	Five Springs	47,823 acres (193.53 km^{2})	July 1991
California	Garcia Mountain	80 acres (0.32 km^{2})	July 1991
California	Hauser Mountain	5,540 acres (22.4 km^{2})	July 1991
California	Independence Creek	6,458 acres (26.13 km^{2})	July 1991
California	Lava	10,770 acres (43.6 km^{2})	July 1991
California	Machesna	70 acres (0.28 km^{2})	July 1991
California	Merced River	12,959 acres (52.44 km^{2})	July 1991
California	Milk Ranch/Case Mountain	8,970 acres (36.3 km^{2})	July 1991
California	Moses	558 acres (2.26 km^{2})	NA
California	Mount Biedeman	13,069 acres (52.89 km^{2})	July 1991
California	Owens Peak	310 acres (1.3 km^{2})	July 1991
California	Panoche Hills North	6,631 acres (26.83 km^{2})	July 1991
California	Panoche Hills South	11,229 acres (45.44 km^{2})	July 1991
California	Pit River Canyon	11,724 acres (47.45 km^{2})	July 1991
California	Piute Cypress	3,453 acres (13.97 km^{2})	July 1991
California	Rockhouse (a)	130 acres (0.53 km^{2})	July 1991
California	Rocky Creek/Cache Creek	6,570 acres (26.6 km^{2})	July 1991
California	Sacatar Meadows	140 acres (0.57 km^{2})	July 1991
California	San Benito Mountain	1,500 acres (6.1 km^{2})	July 1991
California	San Felipe Hills	5,325 acres (21.55 km^{2})	July 1991
California	San Ysidro Mountain	2,125 acres (8.60 km^{2})	July 1991
California	Sawtooth Mountains A	3,883 acres (15.71 km^{2})	July 1991
California	Sawtooth Mountains C	600 acres (2.4 km^{2})	July 1991
California	Scodie	420 acres (1.7 km^{2})	NA
California	Sheep Ridge	5,102 acres (20.65 km^{2})	July 1991
California	Skedaddle	61,421 acres (248.56 km^{2})	July 1991
California	Slinkard	6,268 acres (25.37 km^{2})	July 1991
California	South Warner Contiguous	4,330 acres (17.5 km^{2})	July 1991
California	Southern Inyo	4,900 acres (20 km^{2})	July 1991
California	Symmes Creek	7,694 acres (31.14 km^{2})	July 1991
California	Table Mountain	1,018 acres (4.12 km^{2})	July 1991
California	Thatcher Ridge	130 acres (0.53 km^{2})	July 1991
California	Timbered Crater and Baker Cypress	17,896 acres (72.42 km^{2})	July 1991
California	Tule Mountain	16,998 acres (68.79 km^{2})	July 1991
California	Tunnison Mountain	19,884 acres (80.47 km^{2})	July 1991
California	Twin Peaks	25,667 acres (103.87 km^{2})	July 1991
California	Volcanic Tablelands	12,499 acres (50.58 km^{2})	July 1991
California	White Mountains	1,700 acres (6.9 km^{2})	NA
California	Yolla Bolly Contiguous	646 acres (2.61 km^{2})	July 1991
Colorado	Adobe Badlands	10,425 acres (42.19 km^{2})	January 1993
Colorado	American Flats	3,306 acres (13.38 km^{2})	January 1993
Colorado	Ant Hills	4,354 acres (17.62 km^{2})	January 1993
Colorado	Beaver Creek	26,150 acres (105.8 km^{2})	January 1993
Colorado	Bill Hare Gulch	76 acres (0.31 km^{2})	January 1993
Colorado	Black Canyon	1,430 acres (5.8 km^{2})	NA
Colorado	Black Mountain	9,932 acres (40.19 km^{2})	January 1993
Colorado	Black Ridge Canyons	0 acres (0 km^{2})	January 1993
Colorado	Browns Canyon	6,614 acres (26.77 km^{2})	January 1993
Colorado	Bull Canyon	11,777 acres (47.66 km^{2})	January 1993
Colorado	Bull Gulch	15,000 acres (61 km^{2})	January 1993
Colorado	Cahone Canyon	8,960 acres (36.3 km^{2})	January 1993
Colorado	Camel Back	10,402 acres (42.10 km^{2})	January 1993
Colorado	Castle Peak	11,940 acres (48.3 km^{2})	January 1993
Colorado	Chew Winter Camp	1,320 acres (5.3 km^{2})	January 1993
Colorado	Cross Canyon	11,580 acres (46.9 km^{2})	January 1993
Colorado	Cross Mountain	14,081 acres (56.98 km^{2})	January 1993
Colorado	Demaree Canyon	21,050 acres (85.2 km^{2})	January 1993
Colorado	Diamond Breaks	31,480 acres (127.4 km^{2})	January 1993
Colorado	Dolores River Canyon	28,668 acres (116.02 km^{2})	January 1993
Colorado	Domingquez Canyon	2,086 acres (8.44 km^{2})	January 1993
Colorado	Eagle Mountain	330 acres (1.3 km^{2})	January 1993
Colorado	Hack Lake	10 acres (0.040 km^{2})	January 1993
Colorado	Handies Peak	16,664 acres (67.44 km^{2})	January 1993
Colorado	High Mesa Grassland	680 acres (2.8 km^{2})	January 1993
Colorado	Little Book Cliffs	26,525 acres (107.34 km^{2})	January 1993
Colorado	Lower Grape Creek	11,220 acres (45.4 km^{2})	January 1993
Colorado	McIntyre Hills	16,650 acres (67.4 km^{2})	January 1993
Colorado	McKenna Peak	19,398 acres (78.50 km^{2})	January 1993
Colorado	Menefee Mountain	7,089 acres (28.69 km^{2})	January 1993
Colorado	Needle Rock	80 acres (0.32 km^{2})	January 1993
Colorado	North Sand Hills	791 acres (3.20 km^{2})	January 1993
Colorado	Oil Spring Mountain	17,740 acres (71.8 km^{2})	January 1993
Colorado	Papa Keal	366 acres (1.48 km^{2})	January 1993
Colorado	Peterson Draw	5,160 acres (20.9 km^{2})	January 1993
Colorado	Platte River Contiguous	30 acres (0.12 km^{2})	January 1993
Colorado	Powderhorn	7,022 acres (28.42 km^{2})	January 1993
Colorado	Rare Lizard and Snake	443 acres (1.79 km^{2})	January 1993
Colorado	Red Cloud Peak	36,722 acres (148.61 km^{2})	January 1993
Colorado	San Luis Hills	10,240 acres (41.4 km^{2})	January 1993
Colorado	Sewemup Mesa	19,140 acres (77.5 km^{2})	January 1993
Colorado	Skull Creek	13,740 acres (55.6 km^{2})	January 1993
Colorado	Squaw/Papoose Canyon	4,611 acres (18.66 km^{2})	January 1993
Colorado	The Palisade	26,050 acres (105.4 km^{2})	January 1993
Colorado	Troublesome	8,250 acres (33.4 km^{2})	January 1993
Colorado	Upper Grape Creek	10,200 acres (41 km^{2})	January 1993
Colorado	Vale of Tears	7,420 acres (30.0 km^{2})	January 1993
Colorado	Weber Mountain	6,303 acres (25.51 km^{2})	January 1993
Colorado	Weminuche Contiguous	1,840 acres (7.4 km^{2})	NA
Colorado	West Cold Spring	14,482 acres (58.61 km^{2})	January 1993
Colorado	Whitehead Gulch	1,500 acres (6.1 km^{2})	NA
Colorado	Willow Creek	13,368 acres (54.10 km^{2})	January 1993
Colorado	Windy Gulch	12,274 acres (49.67 km^{2})	September 1992
Idaho	Appendicitis Hill	25,376 acres (102.69 km^{2})	September 1992
Idaho	Bear Den Butte	5,419 acres (21.93 km^{2})	September 1992
Idaho	Black Butte	3,893 acres (15.75 km^{2})	September 1992
Idaho	Black Canyon I	10,609 acres (42.93 km^{2})	September 1992
Idaho	Black Canyon II	5,534 acres (22.40 km^{2})	September 1992
Idaho	Borah Peak	3,941 acres (15.95 km^{2})	September 1992
Idaho	Box Creek	439 acres (1.78 km^{2})	September 1992
Idaho	Burnt Creek	23,829 acres (96.43 km^{2})	September 1992
Idaho	Cedar Butte	36,390 acres (147.3 km^{2})	September 1992
Idaho	China Cup Butte	166 acres (0.67 km^{2})	1985
Idaho	Crystal Lake	8,893 acres (35.99 km^{2})	September 1992
Idaho	Deer Creek	8,071 acres (32.66 km^{2})	September 1992
Idaho	Eighteen Mile	25,015 acres (101.23 km^{2})	September 1992
Idaho	Friedman Creek	9,424 acres (38.14 km^{2})	September 1992
Idaho	Goldburg	3,946 acres (15.97 km^{2})	September 1992
Idaho	Gooding City of Rocks East	14,317 acres (57.94 km^{2})	September 1992
Idaho	Gooding City of Rocks West	6,656 acres (26.94 km^{2})	September 1992
Idaho	Grandmother Mountain	11,825 acres (47.85 km^{2})	September 1992
Idaho	Great Rift	46,632 acres (188.71 km^{2})	September 1992
Idaho	Hawley Mountain	16,807 acres (68.02 km^{2})	September 1992
Idaho	Hell's Half Acre	67,751 acres (274.18 km^{2})	September 1992
Idaho	Henry's Lake	337 acres (1.36 km^{2})	September 1992
Idaho	King Hill Creek	28,218 acres (114.19 km^{2})	September 1992
Idaho	Lava	23,276 acres (94.19 km^{2})	September 1992
Idaho	Little City of Rocks	6,606 acres (26.73 km^{2})	September 1992
Idaho	Little Deer	13,936 acres (56.40 km^{2})	September 1992
Idaho	Little Wood River	4,183 acres (16.93 km^{2})	September 1992
Idaho	Lower Salmon Falls Creek	3,282 acres (13.28 km^{2})	September 1992
Idaho	Marshall Mountain	5,527 acres (22.37 km^{2})	September 1992
Idaho	Petticoat Peak	11,192 acres (45.29 km^{2})	September 1992
Idaho	Raven's Eye	31,319 acres (126.74 km^{2})	September 1992
Idaho	Sand Butte	21,399 acres (86.60 km^{2})	September 1992
Idaho	Sand Mountain	21,709 acres (87.85 km^{2})	September 1992
Idaho	Selkirk Crest	622 acres (2.52 km^{2})	September 1992
Idaho	Shale Butte	15,560 acres (63.0 km^{2})	September 1992
Idaho	Shoshone	6,757 acres (27.34 km^{2})	September 1992
Idaho	Snake River Islands	341 acres (1.38 km^{2})	September 1992
Idaho	Snowhole Rapids	5,336 acres (21.59 km^{2})	September 1992
Idaho	White Knob Mountains	10,047 acres (40.66 km^{2})	September 1992
Idaho	Worm Creek	39 acres (0.16 km^{2})	September 1992
Montana	Antelope Creek	12,350 acres (50.0 km^{2})	January 1993
Montana	Axolotl Lakes	7,804 acres (31.58 km^{2})	January 1993
Montana	Bell/Limekiln Canyons	9,650 acres (39.1 km^{2})	January 1993
Montana	Big Horn Tack-on	2,470 acres (10.0 km^{2})	January 1993
Montana	Billy Creek	3,450 acres (14.0 km^{2})	January 1993
Montana	Bitter Creek	59,660 acres (241.4 km^{2})	January 1993
Montana	Black Sage	5,926 acres (23.98 km^{2})	January 1993
Montana	Blacktail Mountains	17,479 acres (70.74 km^{2})	January 1993
Montana	Bridge Coulee	5,900 acres (24 km^{2})	January 1993
Montana	Burnt Lodge	13,730 acres (55.6 km^{2})	January 1993
Montana	Burnt Timber Canyon	3,430 acres (13.9 km^{2})	January 1993
Montana	Centennial Mountains	27,691 acres (112.06 km^{2})	January 1993
Montana	Cow Creek	34,050 acres (137.8 km^{2})	January 1993
Montana	Dog Creek South	5,150 acres (20.8 km^{2})	January 1993
Montana	East Fork Blacktail Deer Creek	6,230 acres (25.2 km^{2})	January 1993
Montana	Elkhorn	3,585 acres (14.51 km^{2})	January 1993
Montana	Ervin Ridge	10,200 acres (41 km^{2})	January 1993
Montana	Farlin Creek	1,139 acres (4.61 km^{2})	January 1993
Montana	Henneberry Ridge	9,806 acres (39.68 km^{2})	January 1993
Montana	Hidden Pasture Creek	15,509 acres (62.76 km^{2})	January 1993
Montana	Hoodoo Mountain	11,380 acres (46.1 km^{2})	January 1993
Montana	Humbug Spires	11,175 acres (45.22 km^{2})	January 1993
Montana	Musselshell Breaks	8,650 acres (35.0 km^{2})	January 1993
Montana	Pryor Mountain	12,575 acres (50.89 km^{2})	January 1993
Montana	Quigg West	520 acres (2.1 km^{2})	January 1993
Montana	Ruby Mountains	26,611 acres (107.69 km^{2})	January 1993
Montana	Seven Blackfoot	20,250 acres (81.9 km^{2})	January 1993
Montana	Sleeping Giant/Sheep Creek	10,454 acres (42.31 km^{2})	January 1993
Montana	Square Butte	1,947 acres (7.88 km^{2})	January 1993
Montana	Stafford	4,800 acres (19 km^{2})	January 1993
Montana	Terry Badlands	44,910 acres (181.7 km^{2})	January 1993
Montana	Twin Coulee	6,870 acres (27.8 km^{2})	January 1993
Montana	Wales Creek	11,580 acres (46.9 km^{2})	January 1993
Montana	Woodhawk	8,100 acres (33 km^{2})	January 1993
Montana	Yellowstone River Island	53 acres (0.21 km^{2})	January 1993
Nevada	Antelope Range	43,700 acres (177 km^{2})	September 1992
Nevada	Augusta Mountains	23,580 acres (95.4 km^{2})	September 1992
Nevada	Bad Lands	9,426 acres (38.15 km^{2})	September 1992
Nevada	Blue Eagle	59,560 acres (241.0 km^{2})	May 1992
Nevada	Bluebell	55,665 acres (225.27 km^{2})	May 1992
Nevada	Buffalo Hills	45,287 acres (183.27 km^{2})	May 1992
Nevada	Burbank Canyons	13,395 acres (54.21 km^{2})	May 1992
Nevada	Cedar Ridge	10,009 acres (40.50 km^{2})	September 1992
Nevada	China Mountain	10,358 acres (41.92 km^{2})	May 1992
Nevada	Disaster Peak	13,200 acres (53 km^{2})	May 1992
Nevada	Dry Valley Rim	76,177 acres (308.28 km^{2})	September 1992
Nevada	Fandango	530 acres (2.1 km^{2})	May 1992
Nevada	Five Springs	1,383 acres (5.60 km^{2})	May 1992
Nevada	Fox Range	75,404 acres (305.15 km^{2})	September 1992
Nevada	Gabbs Valley Range	79,600 acres (322 km^{2})	May 1992
Nevada	Goshute Canyon	362 acres (1.46 km^{2})	May 1992
Nevada	Goshute Peak	69,770 acres (282.3 km^{2})	May 1992
Nevada	Grapevine Mountains	66,800 acres (270 km^{2})	May 1992
Nevada	Kawich	54,320 acres (219.8 km^{2})	May 1992
Nevada	Lahonton Cutthroat Trout	12,316 acres (49.84 km^{2})	May 1992
Nevada	Little Humboldt River	42,213 acres (170.83 km^{2})	September 1992
Nevada	Massacre Rim	101,290 acres (409.9 km^{2})	May 1992
Nevada	Million Hills	21,296 acres (86.18 km^{2})	May 1992
Nevada	Morey Peak	5,070 acres (20.5 km^{2})	May 1992
Nevada	Mount Limbo	23,752 acres (96.12 km^{2})	May 1992
Nevada	Mount Stirling	5,600 acres (23 km^{2})	September 1992
Nevada	Mountain Meadow	22 acres (0.089 km^{2})	May 1992
Nevada	North Fork Little Humboldt	69,683 acres (282.00 km^{2})	May 1992
Nevada	Owyhee Canyon	21,875 acres (88.52 km^{2})	May 1992
Nevada	Palisade Mesa	99,550 acres (402.9 km^{2})	September 1992
Nevada	Park Range	47,268 acres (191.29 km^{2})	May 1992
Nevada	Pigeon Spring	3,575 acres (14.47 km^{2})	May 1992
Nevada	Pinyon Joshua	560 acres (2.3 km^{2})	May 1992
Nevada	Pole Creek	12,969 acres (52.48 km^{2})	May 1992
Nevada	Poodle Mountain	142,050 acres (574.9 km^{2})	May 1992
Nevada	Pueblo Mountains	600 acres (2.4 km^{2})	May 1992
Nevada	Queer Mountain	81,550 acres (330.0 km^{2})	May 1992
Nevada	Rawhide Mountain	64,360 acres (260.5 km^{2})	May 1992
Nevada	Red Spring	7,847 acres (31.76 km^{2})	May 1992
Nevada	Resting Springs	3,850 acres (15.6 km^{2})	May 1992
Nevada	Riordan's Well	57,002 acres (230.68 km^{2})	May 1992
Nevada	Roberts Mountain	15,090 acres (61.1 km^{2})	May 1992
Nevada	Rough Hills	6,685 acres (27.05 km^{2})	May 1992
Nevada	Selenite Mountains	32,041 acres (129.67 km^{2})	May 1992
Nevada	Sheldon Contiguous	23,700 acres (96 km^{2})	September 1992
Nevada	Silver Peak Range	33,900 acres (137 km^{2})	May 1992
Nevada	Simpson Park	49,670 acres (201.0 km^{2})	September 1992
Nevada	Skedaddle	589 acres (2.38 km^{2})	May 1992
Nevada	South Fork Owyhee River	7,842 acres (31.74 km^{2})	May 1992
Nevada	South Pequop	41,090 acres (166.3 km^{2})	May 1992
Nevada	South Reveille	106,200 acres (430 km^{2})	May 1992
Nevada	The Wall	38,000 acres (150 km^{2})	May 1992
Nevada	Tobin Range	13,107 acres (53.04 km^{2})	May 1992
Nevada	Twin Peaks	65,114 acres (263.51 km^{2})	September 1992
Nevada	Virgin Mountain	6,560 acres (26.5 km^{2})	May 1992
Nevada	Wall Canyon	46,305 acres (187.39 km^{2})	September 1992
New Mexico	Alama Hueco Mountains	16,264 acres (65.82 km^{2})	September 1992
New Mexico	Antelope	20,710 acres (83.8 km^{2})	September 1992
New Mexico	Apache Box	932 acres (3.77 km^{2})	September 1992
New Mexico	Apache box Add-on	6,229 acres (25.21 km^{2})	NA
New Mexico	Big Hatchet Mountains	65,872 acres (266.57 km^{2})	September 1992
New Mexico	Blue Creek	14,896 acres (60.28 km^{2})	September 1992
New Mexico	Brokeoff Mountains	31,606 acres (127.90 km^{2})	September 1992
New Mexico	Cabezon	8,159 acres (33.02 km^{2})	September 1992
New Mexico	Canyons	3,930 acres (15.9 km^{2})	NA
New Mexico	Carrizozo Lava Flow	10,690 acres (43.3 km^{2})	September 1992
New Mexico	Cedar Mountains	14,911 acres (60.34 km^{2})	September 1992
New Mexico	Chain-of-Craters	18,300 acres (74 km^{2})	1991
New Mexico	Chamisa	16,602 acres (67.19 km^{2})	September 1992
New Mexico	Continental Divide	68,761 acres (278.27 km^{2})	September 1992
New Mexico	Cooke's Range	19,608 acres (79.35 km^{2})	September 1992
New Mexico	Cowboy Spring	6,699 acres (27.11 km^{2})	September 1992
New Mexico	Culp Canyon	10,937 acres (44.26 km^{2})	September 1992
New Mexico	Devil's Backbone	8,904 acres (36.03 km^{2})	September 1992
New Mexico	Devil's Den Canyon	320 acres (1.3 km^{2})	September 1992
New Mexico	Devil's Ranch	860 acres (3.5 km^{2})	NA
New Mexico	Eagle Peak	43,960 acres (177.9 km^{2})	September 1992
New Mexico	El Malpais	21,300 acres (86 km^{2})	September 1992
New Mexico	Empedrado	9,007 acres (36.45 km^{2})	September 1992
New Mexico	Florida Mountains	22,336 acres (90.39 km^{2})	September 1992
New Mexico	Gila Lower Box	8,555 acres (34.62 km^{2})	September 1992
New Mexico	Gray Peak	14,678 acres (59.40 km^{2})	September 1992
New Mexico	Guadalupe Canyon	4,146 acres (16.78 km^{2})	September 1992
New Mexico	Horse Mountain	5,032 acres (20.36 km^{2})	September 1992
New Mexico	Hoverrocker	22 acres (0.089 km^{2})	September 1992
New Mexico	Ignacio Chavez	33,609 acres (136.01 km^{2})	September 1992
New Mexico	Jornada del Muerto	31,147 acres (126.05 km^{2})	September 1992
New Mexico	La Lena	11,718 acres (47.42 km^{2})	September 1992
New Mexico	Little Black Peak	15,469 acres (62.60 km^{2})	September 1992
New Mexico	Lonesome Ridge	3,505 acres (14.18 km^{2})	September 1992
New Mexico	Manzano	881 acres (3.57 km^{2})	September 1992
New Mexico	Mathers	362 acres (1.46 km^{2})	September 1992
New Mexico	McKittrick Canyon	200 acres (0.81 km^{2})	September 1992
New Mexico	Mesita Blanca	19,414 acres (78.57 km^{2})	September 1992
New Mexico	Mudgetts	2,941 acres (11.90 km^{2})	September 1992
New Mexico	Ojito	124 acres (0.50 km^{2})	September 1992
New Mexico	Peloncillo Mountains	4,061 acres (16.43 km^{2})	September 1992
New Mexico	Petaca Pinta	11,668 acres (47.22 km^{2})	September 1992
New Mexico	Presilla	8,680 acres (35.1 km^{2})	September 1992
New Mexico	Rio Chama	12,671 acres (51.28 km^{2})	September 1992
New Mexico	Sierra de las Canas	12,838 acres (51.95 km^{2})	September 1992
New Mexico	Sierra Ladrones	45,308 acres (183.35 km^{2})	September 1992
New Mexico	Stallion	24,238 acres (98.09 km^{2})	September 1992
New Mexico	Veranito	7,206 acres (29.16 km^{2})	September 1992
New Mexico	West Potrillo Mountains	4,100 acres (17 km^{2})	September 1992
Oregon	Abert Rim	25,105 acres (101.60 km^{2})	July 1992
Oregon	Aldrich Mountain	9,132 acres (36.96 km^{2})	July 1992
Oregon	Alvord Desert	236,276 acres (956.18 km^{2})	July 1992
Oregon	Basque Hills	140,271 acres (567.66 km^{2})	July 1992
Oregon	Beaver Dam Creek	19,080 acres (77.2 km^{2})	July 1992
Oregon	Blitzen River	31,914 acres (129.15 km^{2})	July 1992
Oregon	Blue Canyon	12,581 acres (50.91 km^{2})	July 1992
Oregon	Bowden Hills	59,031 acres (238.89 km^{2})	July 1992
Oregon	Brewer Spruce	208 acres (0.84 km^{2})	July 1992
Oregon	Bridge Creek	14,322 acres (57.96 km^{2})	July 1992
Oregon	Camp Creek	19,880 acres (80.5 km^{2})	July 1992
Oregon	Castle Rock	6,151 acres (24.89 km^{2})	July 1992
Oregon	Cedar Mountain	33,433 acres (135.30 km^{2})	July 1992
Oregon	Clarks Butte	31,291 acres (126.63 km^{2})	July 1992
Oregon	Cottonwood Creek	8,110 acres (32.8 km^{2})	July 1992
Oregon	Cougar Well	19,345 acres (78.29 km^{2})	July 1992
Oregon	Deschutes Canyon-Steelhead Falls	2,504 acres (10.13 km^{2})	July 1992
Oregon	Devils Garden Lava Bed	28,163 acres (113.97 km^{2})	July 1992
Oregon	Diablo Mountain	118,693 acres (480.33 km^{2})	July 1992
Oregon	Disaster Peak	17,376 acres (70.32 km^{2})	July 1992
Oregon	Douglas-Fir	579 acres (2.34 km^{2})	July 1992
Oregon	Dry Creek	23,353 acres (94.51 km^{2})	July 1992
Oregon	Dry Creek Buttes	51,285 acres (207.54 km^{2})	July 1992
Oregon	East Alvord	22,142 acres (89.61 km^{2})	July 1992
Oregon	Fifteenmile Creek	50,352 acres (203.77 km^{2})	July 1992
Oregon	Fish Creek Rim	19,141 acres (77.46 km^{2})	July 1992
Oregon	Four Craters Lava Bed	12,474 acres (50.48 km^{2})	July 1992
Oregon	Gerry Mountain	22,289 acres (90.20 km^{2})	July 1992
Oregon	Gold Creek	13,591 acres (55.00 km^{2})	July 1992
Oregon	Guano Creek	10,557 acres (42.72 km^{2})	July 1992
Oregon	Hampton Butte	10,246 acres (41.46 km^{2})	July 1992
Oregon	Hawk Mountain	69,741 acres (282.23 km^{2})	July 1992
Oregon	Heath Lake	21,199 acres (85.79 km^{2})	July 1992
Oregon	High Steens	14,092 acres (57.03 km^{2})	July 1992
Oregon	Home Creek	1,178 acres (4.77 km^{2})	July 1992
Oregon	Homestead	7,615 acres (30.82 km^{2})	July 1992
Oregon	Honeycombs	38,771 acres (156.90 km^{2})	July 1992
Oregon	Indian Creek	211 acres (0.85 km^{2})	July 1992
Oregon	Jordan Craters	27,761 acres (112.34 km^{2})	July 1992
Oregon	Little Sink	80 acres (0.32 km^{2})	July 1992
Oregon	Lookout Butte	66,194 acres (267.88 km^{2})	July 1992
Oregon	Lost Forest	8,084 acres (32.71 km^{2})	July 1992
Oregon	Lower John Day	25,406 acres (102.81 km^{2})	July 1992
Oregon	Lower Owyhee Canyon	74,767 acres (302.57 km^{2})	July 1992
Oregon	Lower Stonehouse	7,460 acres (30.2 km^{2})	July 1992
Oregon	Mahogany Ridge	27,365 acres (110.74 km^{2})	July 1992
Oregon	Malheur River-Bluebucket Creek	5,543 acres (22.43 km^{2})	July 1992
Oregon	Mcgraw Creek	505 acres (2.04 km^{2})	July 1992
Oregon	Mountain Lakes	340 acres (1.4 km^{2})	July 1992
Oregon	North Fork	11,398 acres (46.13 km^{2})	July 1992
Oregon	North Pole Ridge	7,317 acres (29.61 km^{2})	July 1992
Oregon	Oregon Canyon	42,071 acres (170.26 km^{2})	July 1992
Oregon	Orejana Canyon	24,147 acres (97.72 km^{2})	July 1992
Oregon	Owyhee Breaks	13,108 acres (53.05 km^{2})	July 1992
Oregon	Owyhee River Canyon	187,344 acres (758.15 km^{2})	July 1992
Oregon	Palomino Hills	54,256 acres (219.57 km^{2})	NA
Oregon	Pats Cabin	9,817 acres (39.73 km^{2})	July 1992
Oregon	Pine Creek	211 acres (0.85 km^{2})	July 1992
Oregon	Pueblo Mountains	73,433 acres (297.17 km^{2})	July 1992
Oregon	Red Mountain	15,649 acres (63.33 km^{2})	July 1992
Oregon	Rincon	108,485 acres (439.02 km^{2})	July 1992
Oregon	Saddle Butte	85,766 acres (347.08 km^{2})	July 1992
Oregon	Sage Hen Hills	7,974 acres (32.27 km^{2})	July 1992
Oregon	Sand Dunes	16,478 acres (66.68 km^{2})	July 1992
Oregon	Sand Hollow	9,368 acres (37.91 km^{2})	July 1992
Oregon	Sheep Gulch	730 acres (3.0 km^{2})	July 1992
Oregon	Sheep Mountain	7,247 acres (29.33 km^{2})	July 1992
Oregon	Sheepshead Mountains	52,793 acres (213.65 km^{2})	July 1992
Oregon	Slocum Creek	7,530 acres (30.5 km^{2})	July 1992
Oregon	South Fork	20,341 acres (82.32 km^{2})	July 1992
Oregon	South Fork Donner and Blitzen	27,980 acres (113.2 km^{2})	July 1992
Oregon	Spaulding	68,411 acres (276.85 km^{2})	July 1992
Oregon	Sperry Creek	5,295 acres (21.43 km^{2})	July 1992
Oregon	Spring Basin	6,596 acres (26.69 km^{2})	July 1992
Oregon	Squaw Ridge Lava Bed	28,673 acres (116.04 km^{2})	July 1992
Oregon	Stonehouse	22,763 acres (92.12 km^{2})	July 1992
Oregon	Sutton Mountain	28,878 acres (116.87 km^{2})	NA
Oregon	Table Mountain	40,051 acres (162.08 km^{2})	July 1992
Oregon	Thirtymile	7,624 acres (30.85 km^{2})	July 1992
Oregon	Twelvemile Creek	28,111 acres (113.76 km^{2})	July 1992
Oregon	Upper Leslie Gulch	2,905 acres (11.76 km^{2})	July 1992
Oregon	Upper West Little Owyhee	61,458 acres (248.71 km^{2})	July 1992
Oregon	West Peak	8,590 acres (34.8 km^{2})	July 1992
Oregon	Western Juniper	600 acres (2.4 km^{2})	July 1992
Oregon	Wild Horse Basin	12,007 acres (48.59 km^{2})	July 1992
Oregon	Wildcat Canyon	34,724 acres (140.52 km^{2})	July 1992
Oregon	Willow Creek	29,852 acres (120.81 km^{2})	July 1992
Oregon	Winter Range	15,501 acres (62.73 km^{2})	July 1992
Utah	Behind The Rocks	13,065 acres (52.87 km^{2})	June 1992
Utah	Black Ridge Canyon West	52 acres (0.21 km^{2})	June 1992
Utah	Book Cliffs Mountain Browse	399 acres (1.61 km^{2})	June 1992
Utah	Bridge Jack Mesa	6,333 acres (25.63 km^{2})	June 1992
Utah	Bull Canyon	599 acres (2.42 km^{2})	June 1992
Utah	Bull Mountain	13,138 acres (53.17 km^{2})	June 1992
Utah	Burning Hills	65,710 acres (265.9 km^{2})	June 1992
Utah	Butler Wash	24,277 acres (98.25 km^{2})	June 1992
Utah	Canaan Mountain	4,985 acres (20.17 km^{2})	June 1992
Utah	Carcass Canyon	48,628 acres (196.79 km^{2})	June 1992
Utah	Cheesebox Canyon	14,831 acres (60.02 km^{2})	June 1992
Utah	Coal Canyon	60,755 acres (245.87 km^{2})	June 1992
Utah	Conger Mountain	20,161 acres (81.59 km^{2})	June 1992
Utah	Cross Canyon	949 acres (3.84 km^{2})	June 1992
Utah	Daniels Canyon	2,516 acres (10.18 km^{2})	June 1992
Utah	Dark Canyon	67,825 acres (274.48 km^{2})	June 1992
Utah	Death Ridge	66,286 acres (268.25 km^{2})	June 1992
Utah	Deep Creek Mountains	79,144 acres (320.28 km^{2})	June 1992
Utah	Desolation Canyon	162,472 acres (657.50 km^{2})	June 1992
Utah	Devils Garden	633 acres (2.56 km^{2})	June 1992
Utah	Diamond Breaks	3,926 acres (15.89 km^{2})	June 1992
Utah	Dirty Devil	71,883 acres (290.90 km^{2})	June 1992
Utah	Escalante Canyon Tract 1	364 acres (1.47 km^{2})	June 1992
Utah	Escalante Canyon Tract 5	761 acres (3.08 km^{2})	June 1992
Utah	Fiddler Butte	73,360 acres (296.9 km^{2})	June 1992
Utah	Fifty Mile Mountain	160,833 acres (650.87 km^{2})	June 1992
Utah	Fish Creek Canyon	46,102 acres (186.57 km^{2})	June 1992
Utah	Fish Springs	57,609 acres (233.14 km^{2})	June 1992
Utah	Floy Canyon	72,282 acres (292.51 km^{2})	June 1992
Utah	Flume Canyon	50,628 acres (204.88 km^{2})	June 1992
Utah	Fremont Gorge	2,843 acres (11.51 km^{2})	June 1992
Utah	French Spring-Happy Canyon	24,306 acres (98.36 km^{2})	June 1992
Utah	Grand Gulch	105,213 acres (425.78 km^{2})	June 1992
Utah	Horseshoe Canyon (North)	2,402 acres (9.72 km^{2})	June 1992
Utah	Horseshoe Canyon (South)	39,842 acres (161.23 km^{2})	June 1992
Utah	Howell Peak	27,545 acres (111.47 km^{2})	June 1992
Utah	Indian Creek	6,554 acres (26.52 km^{2})	June 1992
Utah	Jack Canyon	7,203 acres (29.15 km^{2})	June 1992
Utah	King Top	92,847 acres (375.74 km^{2})	June 1992
Utah	Little Rockies	40,733 acres (164.84 km^{2})	June 1992
Utah	Lost Spring Canyon	1,625 acres (6.58 km^{2})	June 1992
Utah	Mancos Mesa	50,889 acres (205.94 km^{2})	June 1992
Utah	Mill Creek Canyon	9,866 acres (39.93 km^{2})	June 1992
Utah	Moquith Mountain	15,249 acres (61.71 km^{2})	June 1992
Utah	Mount Ellen-Blue Hills	81,363 acres (329.26 km^{2})	June 1992
Utah	Mount Hillers	19,277 acres (78.01 km^{2})	June 1992
Utah	Mount Pennell	77,137 acres (312.16 km^{2})	June 1992
Utah	Mud Spring Canyon	40,573 acres (164.19 km^{2})	June 1992
Utah	Mule Canyon	6,171 acres (24.97 km^{2})	June 1992
Utah	Negro Bill Canyon	7,560 acres (30.6 km^{2})	June 1992
Utah	North Escalante Canyon/The Gulch	127,459 acres (515.81 km^{2})	June 1992
Utah	North Fork Virgin River	1,080 acres (4.4 km^{2})	June 1992
Utah	North Stansbury Mountains	10,786 acres (43.65 km^{2})	June 1992
Utah	Notch Peak	57,296 acres (231.87 km^{2})	June 1992
Utah	Orderville Canyon	1,952 acres (7.90 km^{2})	June 1992
Utah	Paria Hackberry	145,828 acres (590.14 km^{2})	June 1992
Utah	Paria Hackberry 202	402 acres (1.63 km^{2})	June 1992
Utah	Parunuweap Canyon	30,907 acres (125.08 km^{2})	June 1992
Utah	Phipps Death Hollow	45,328 acres (183.44 km^{2})	June 1992
Utah	Road Canyon	52,404 acres (212.07 km^{2})	June 1992
Utah	Rockwell	9,342 acres (37.81 km^{2})	June 1992
Utah	Scorpion	37,319 acres (151.02 km^{2})	June 1992
Utah	Scott's Basin	8,265 acres (33.45 km^{2})	June 1992
Utah	South Needles	160 acres (0.65 km^{2})	June 1992
Utah	Spring Creek Canyon	4,333 acres (17.54 km^{2})	June 1992
Utah	Spruce Canyon	20,353 acres (82.37 km^{2})	June 1992
Utah	Squaw/Papoose Canyon	6,560 acres (26.5 km^{2})	June 1992
Utah	Steep Creek	23,978 acres (97.04 km^{2})	June 1992
Utah	Swasey Mountain	59,006 acres (238.79 km^{2})	June 1992
Utah	The Blues	19,416 acres (78.57 km^{2})	June 1992
Utah	The Cockscomb	9,921 acres (40.15 km^{2})	June 1992
Utah	Wah Wah Mountains	49,429 acres (200.03 km^{2})	June 1992
Utah	Wahweap	144,268 acres (583.83 km^{2})	June 1992
Utah	West Cold Spring	3,283 acres (13.29 km^{2})	June 1992
Utah	Westwater Canyon	30,066 acres (121.67 km^{2})	June 1992
Utah	White Rock Range	3,767 acres (15.24 km^{2})	June 1992
Utah	Winter Ridge	43,322 acres (175.32 km^{2})	June 1992
Washington	Chopaka Mountain	5,554 acres (22.48 km^{2})	July 1992
Wyoming	Adobe Town	85,710 acres (346.9 km^{2})	July 1992
Wyoming	Alkali Basin/East Sand Dunes	12,800 acres (52 km^{2})	July 1992
Wyoming	Alkali Creek	10,100 acres (41 km^{2})	July 1992
Wyoming	Alkali Draw	16,990 acres (68.8 km^{2})	July 1992
Wyoming	Bennett Mountains	6,003 acres (24.29 km^{2})	July 1992
Wyoming	Big Horn Tack-on	80 acres (0.32 km^{2})	July 1992
Wyoming	Bobcat Draw Badlands	17,150 acres (69.4 km^{2})	July 1992
Wyoming	Buffalo Hump	10,300 acres (42 km^{2})	July 1992
Wyoming	Cedar Mountain	21,560 acres (87.3 km^{2})	July 1992
Wyoming	Copper Mountain	6,858 acres (27.75 km^{2})	July 1992
Wyoming	Devil's Playground/Twin Buttes	23,841 acres (96.48 km^{2})	July 1992
Wyoming	Dubois Badlands	4,520 acres (18.3 km^{2})	July 1992
Wyoming	Encampment River Canyon	4,547 acres (18.40 km^{2})	July 1992
Wyoming	Ferris Mountains	22,245 acres (90.02 km^{2})	July 1992
Wyoming	Fortification Creek	12,419 acres (50.26 km^{2})	July 1992
Wyoming	Gardner Mountain	6,423 acres (25.99 km^{2})	July 1992
Wyoming	Honeycomb Buttes	40,548 acres (164.09 km^{2})	July 1992
Wyoming	Honeycombs	21,000 acres (85 km^{2})	July 1992
Wyoming	Lake Mountain	13,865 acres (56.11 km^{2})	July 1992
Wyoming	McCullough Peaks	24,570 acres (99.4 km^{2})	July 1992
Wyoming	Medicine Lodge	7,740 acres (31.3 km^{2})	July 1992
Wyoming	North Fork Powder River	10,089 acres (40.83 km^{2})	July 1992
Wyoming	Oregon Buttes	5,700 acres (23 km^{2})	July 1992
Wyoming	Owl Creek	710 acres (2.9 km^{2})	July 1992
Wyoming	Prospect Mountain	1,145 acres (4.63 km^{2})	July 1992
Wyoming	Pryor Mountain	4,352 acres (17.61 km^{2})	July 1992
Wyoming	Raymond Mountain	32,936 acres (133.29 km^{2})	July 1992
Wyoming	Red Butte	11,350 acres (45.9 km^{2})	July 1992
Wyoming	Red Creek Badlands	8,020 acres (32.5 km^{2})	July 1992
Wyoming	Red Lake	9,515 acres (38.51 km^{2})	July 1992
Wyoming	Sand Dunes	26,309 acres (106.47 km^{2})	July 1992
Wyoming	Scab Creek	7,636 acres (30.90 km^{2})	July 1992
Wyoming	Sheep Mountain	23,250 acres (94.1 km^{2})	July 1992
Wyoming	South Pinnacles	10,800 acres (44 km^{2})	July 1992
Wyoming	Sweetwater Canyon	9,056 acres (36.65 km^{2})	July 1992
Wyoming	Sweetwater Rocks (Lankin Dome)	6,316 acres (25.56 km^{2})	July 1992
Wyoming	Sweetwater Rocks (Miller Springs)	6,429 acres (26.02 km^{2})	July 1992
Wyoming	Sweetwater Rocks (Savage Peak)	7,041 acres (28.49 km^{2})	July 1992
Wyoming	Sweetwater Rocks (Split Rock)	12,789 acres (51.76 km^{2})	July 1992
Wyoming	Trapper Creek	7,200 acres (29 km^{2})	July 1992
Wyoming	Whiskey Mountain	487 acres (1.97 km^{2})	July 1992
Wyoming	Whitehorse Creek	4,002 acres (16.20 km^{2})	July 1992

== See also ==
- National Wilderness Preservation System
