= Black Canyon Wilderness Study Area =

Black Canyon Wilderness Study Area may refer to wilderness study areas managed by the U.S. Bureau of Land Management:

- Black Canyon Wilderness Study Area (Gooding County, Idaho)
- Black Canton, a study area in Butte County, Idaho
- Black Canyon, a study area in Colorado

== See also ==
- Black Canyon Wilderness (disambiguation)
