= Gooding City of Rocks East Wilderness Study Area =

Protected area in Idaho, United States

- Gooding City Of Rocks East
- IUCN category Ib (wilderness area)
- Location within Idaho Location within the United States
- Location: Gooding County, Idaho, United States
- Nearest city: Gooding, ID
- Coordinates: 43.11714°N 114.82922°W
- Area: 14,743 acres (5,966 ha)
- Established: 1992
- Governing body: Bureau of Land Management
- Website: Official website

The Gooding City of Rocks East Wilderness Study Area is a Bureau of Land Management wilderness study area that covers 14,743 acres (5,966 ha) in Gooding County, Idaho between the towns of Gooding and Fairfield. The WSA is located on the Bennett Hills and features a collection of rock features called hoodoos, which rise to more than 100 feet (30 m). The Gooding City of Rocks East WSA is contiguous (but divided by dirt roads) with three other WSAs in the Bennett Hills: Black Canyon, Gooding City of Rocks West, and Little City of Rocks. Portions of the WSA's borders are formed by dirt roads, which also separates it from the Gooding City of Rocks West and Black Canyon WSAs.

There is a perennial stream in Dry Creek Canyon supports cutthroat trout on the western side of the WSA. Sagebrush and grasses are the dominant vegetation in the WSA, although willows, quaking aspen, and cottonwoods can be found in sections of some canyons. Wildlife that can be found in the WSA include elk, mule deer, coyote, and various birds of prey and upland game. Other streams, including Hot, Cottonwood, and Coyote creeks, flow through the WSA. Out of the total WSA area of 14,743 acres (5,966 ha), a total of 13,063 acres (5,286 ha) was recommended to be included as part of the National Wilderness Preservation System because it provides exceptional wilderness values. However, the area will remain a WSA until it is released or designated a wilderness area.
