= Black Canyon Wilderness =

Black Canyon Wilderness can refer to:

- Black Canyon Wilderness (Nevada)
- Black Canyon Wilderness (Oregon)
- Black Canyon of the Gunnison Wilderness, Colorado

== See also ==
- Black Canyon Wilderness Study Area (disambiguation)
