= Shale Butte Wilderness Study Area =

Wilderness area in Idaho, United States

- IUCN category Ib (wilderness area)
- Location within the United States
- Location: Lincoln County, Idaho, United States
- Nearest city: Minidoka, ID
- Coordinates: 42.935°N 113.850°W
- Area: 15,560 acres (6,300 ha)
- Established: 1992
- Governing body: Bureau of Land Management

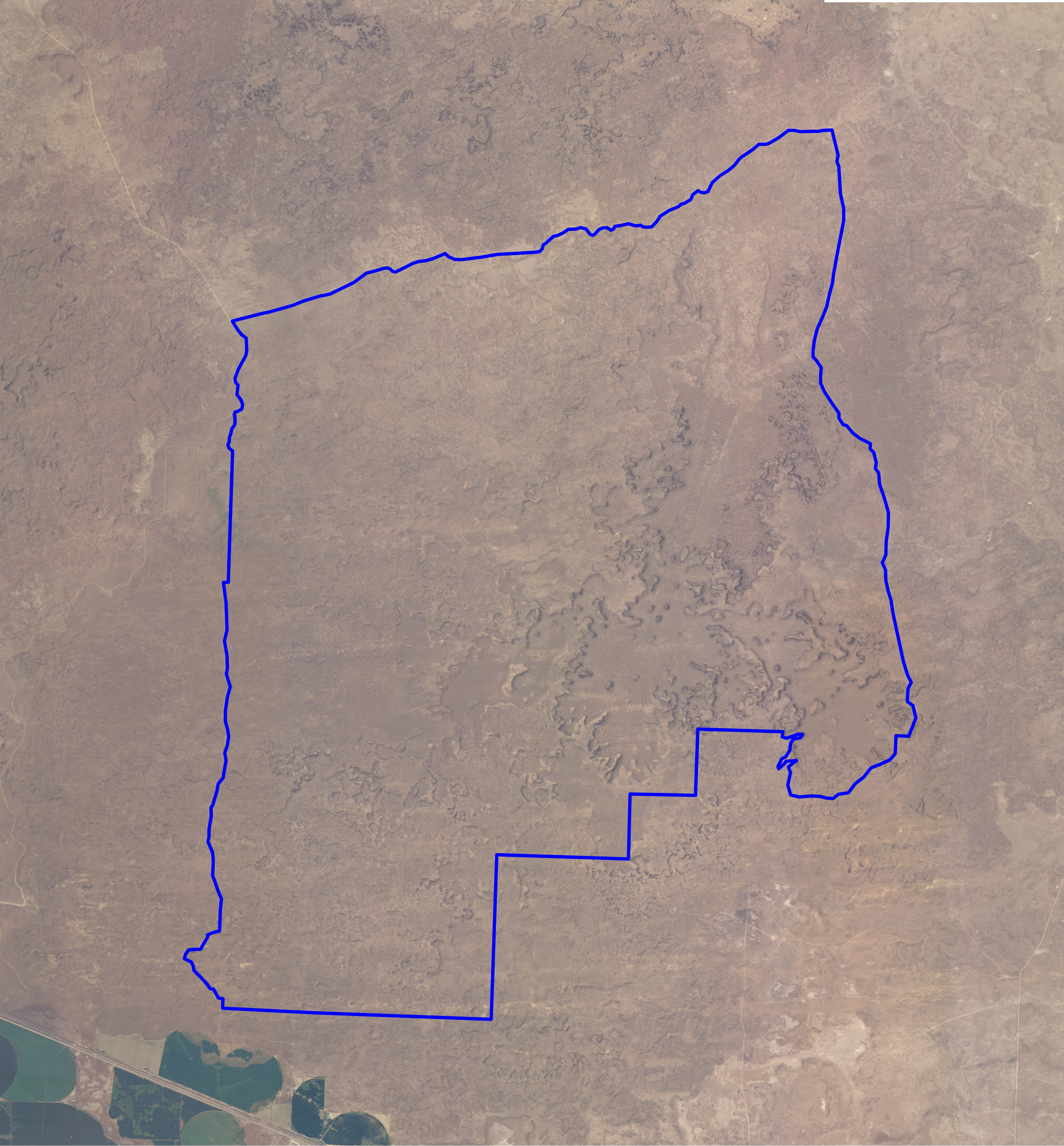
Map of Shale Butte WSA. Image is 13 km across.

The Shale Butte Wilderness Study Area is a Bureau of Land Management wilderness study area (WSA) in Lincoln County, Idaho. It covers 15,560 acres (6,300 ha). The WSA is located to the south of Craters of the Moon National Monument and Preserve.

Shale Butte itself is located in the northeast corner of the WSA. It is not composed of shale, but basalt lava of Pleistocene age. The lava extends to the south from the butte to cover the eastern WSA.

The WSA is accessible only by unimproved roads and jeep trails, or by hiking.

To the north is Sand Butte Wilderness Study Area.

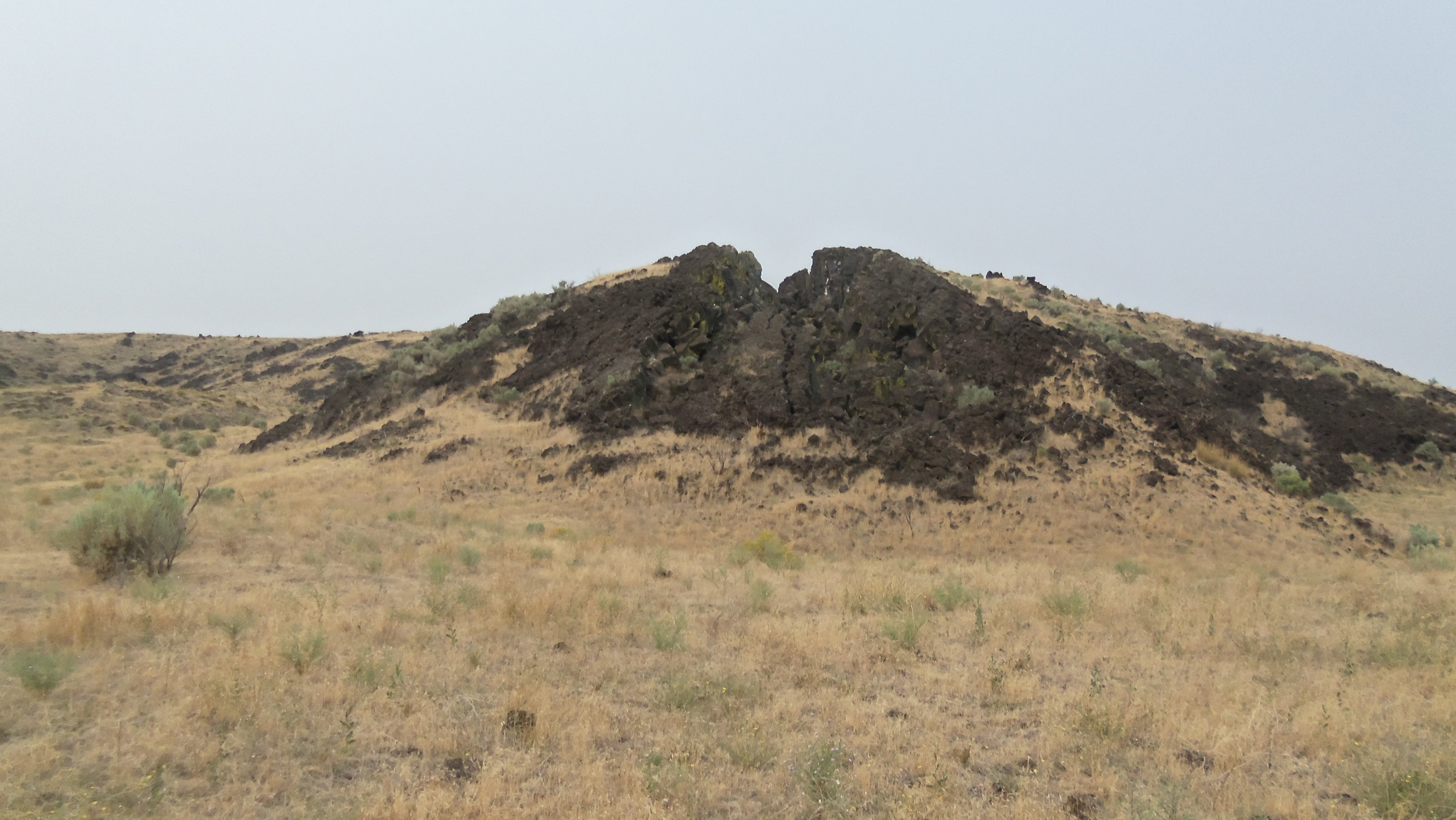
Lava flow in southeastern Shale Butte WSA

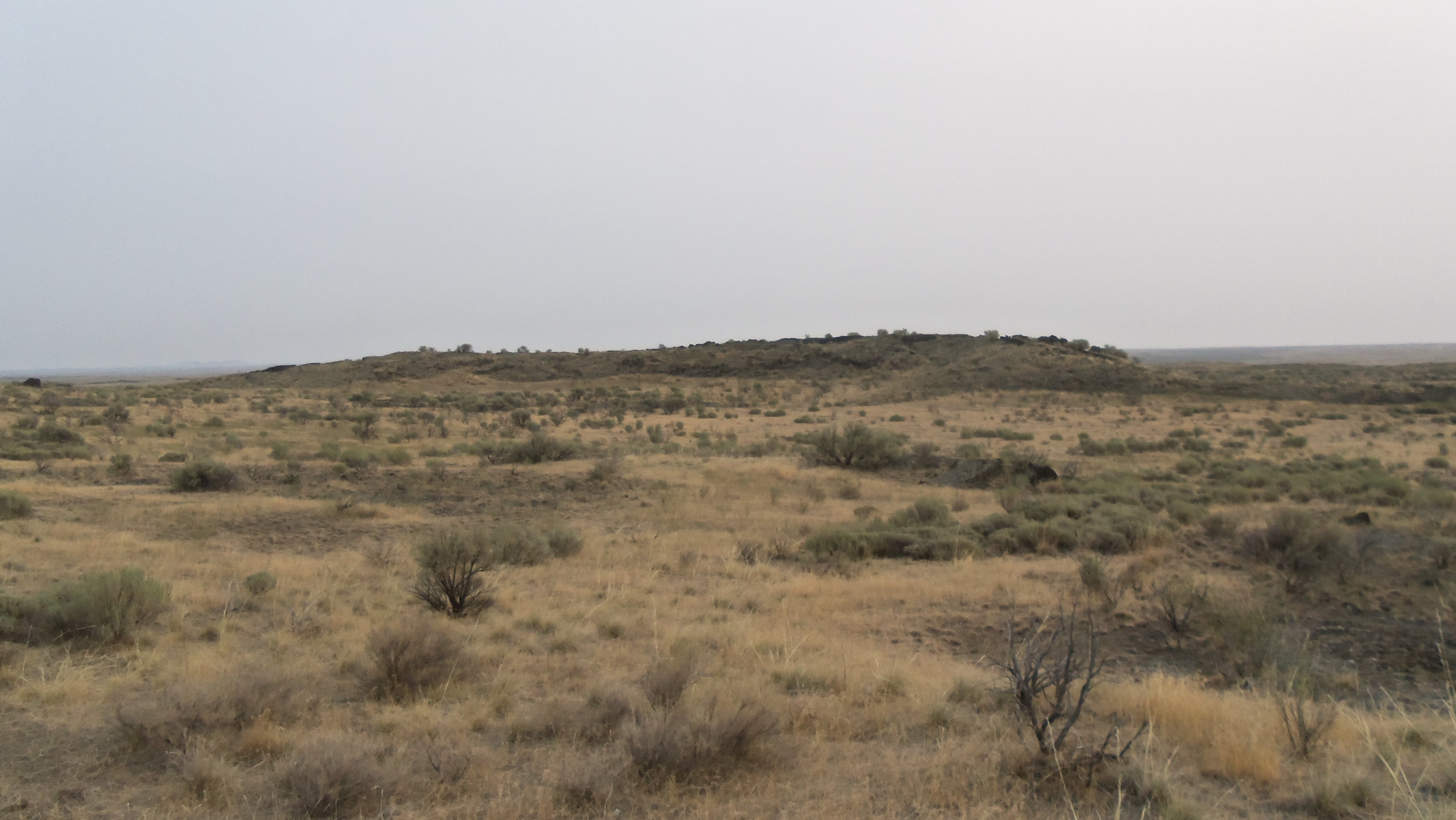
Terrain of northern Shale Butte WSA

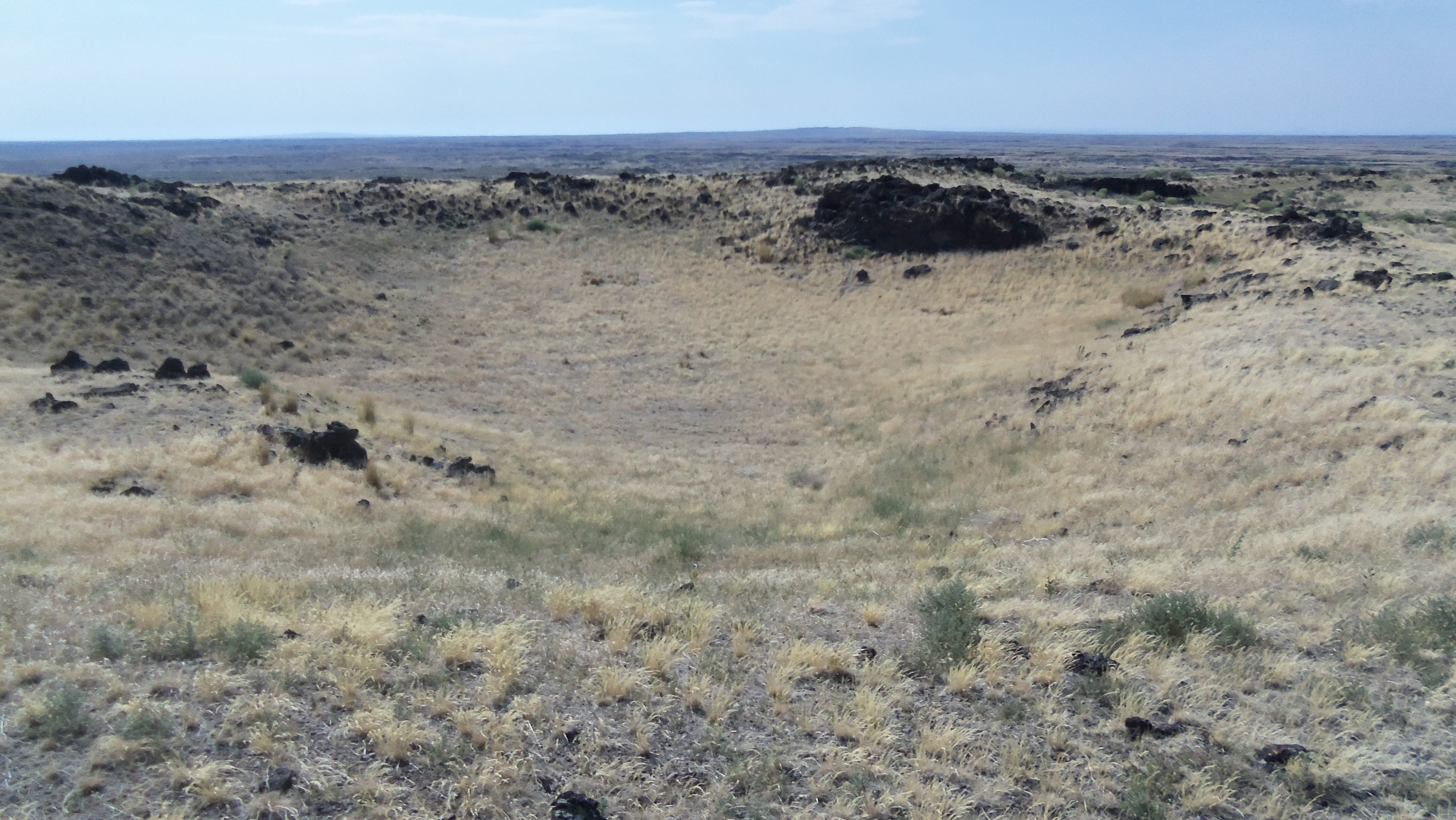
Caldera of Shale Butte
