= Sand Butte Wilderness Study Area =

Protected area in Idaho, U.S.

- IUCN category Ib (wilderness area)
- Location within the United States
- Location: Lincoln County, Idaho, United States
- Nearest city: Carey, Idaho
- Coordinates: 43.11°N 113.89°W
- Area: 21,000 acres (8,500 ha)
- Established: 1992
- Governing body: Bureau of Land Management

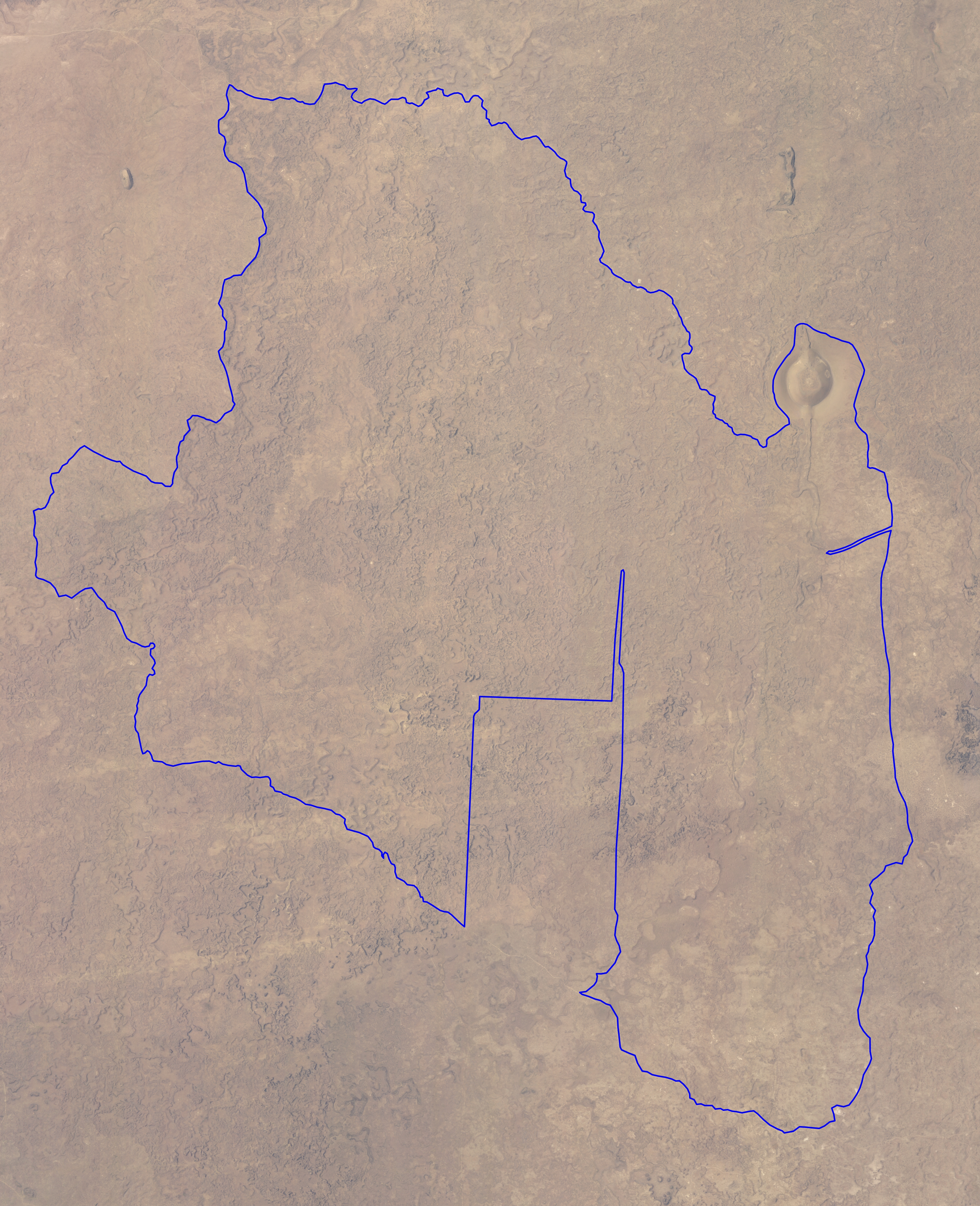
Sand Butte WSA

The Sand Butte Wilderness Study Area is a Bureau of Land Management wilderness study area (WSA) in Lincoln County, Idaho. It covers about 21,000 acres (8,500 ha). The WSA is located to the south of Craters of the Moon National Monument and Preserve.

Sand Butte itself is located in the northeast corner of the WSA, and has a maximum elevation of 4974 feet, standing approximately 300 feet above the surrounding plain. It is not composed of sand, but basalt lava of Pleistocene age, of the Snake River Group.

The WSA is accessible only by unimproved roads and offroad trails, or by hiking.

Shale Butte Wilderness Study Area is to the south, and Raven's Eye Wilderness Study Area is adjacent to the north.

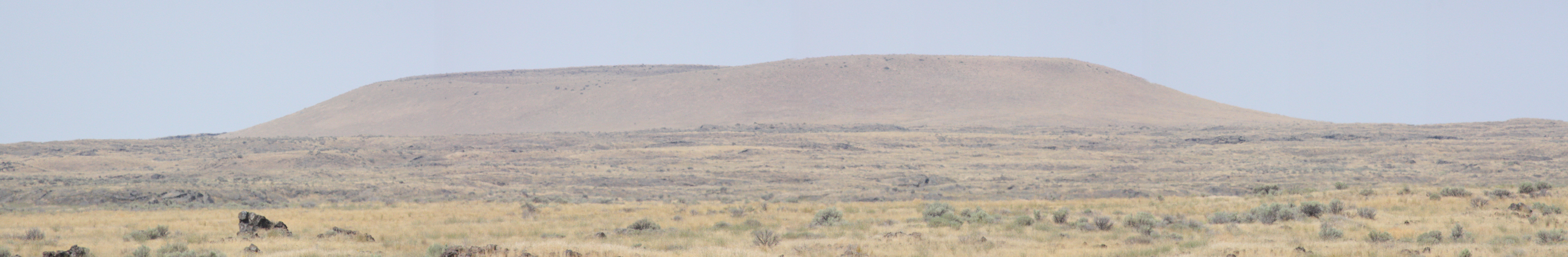
Sand Butte, looking northwest
