= Gooding City of Rocks West Wilderness Study Area =

Protected area in Idaho, United States

- Gooding City of Rocks West
- IUCN category Ib (wilderness area)
- Location within Idaho Location within the United States
- Location: Gooding County, Idaho, United States
- Nearest city: Gooding, ID
- Coordinates: 43.12454°N 114.86755°W
- Area: 6,287 acres (2,544 ha)
- Established: 1992
- Governing body: Bureau of Land Management
- Website: Official website

The Gooding City of Rocks West Wilderness Study Area is a Bureau of Land Management wilderness study area that covers 6,287 acres (2,544 ha) in Gooding County, Idaho between the towns of Gooding and Fairfield. The WSA is located in the Bennett Hills and features a collection of rock features called hoodoos, which rise to more than 100 feet (30 m). The Gooding City of Rocks West WSA is contiguous (but divided by dirt roads) with three other WSAs in the Bennett Hills: Black Canyon, Gooding City of Rocks East, and Little City of Rocks. Portions of the WSA's borders are formed by dirt roads, which also separates it from the Gooding City of Rocks West and Black Canyon WSAs.

Sagebrush and grasses are the dominant vegetation in the WSA, although willows, quaking aspen, cottonwoods, and other trees can be found in shaded sections of some canyons. Elevations in the WSA range from 4,080 ft (1,240 m) to 5,616 ft (1,712 m). Wildlife that can be found in the WSA include elk, mule deer, coyote, and various birds of prey and upland game. Catchall Creek and other streams flow through the WSA. All of the WSA was recommended to be included as part of the National Wilderness Preservation System because it provides exceptional wilderness values. However, the area will remain a WSA until it is released or designated a wilderness area. Petroglyphs and surface lithic scatters can be found in the WSA.|year=2009
