= Little City of Rocks Wilderness Study Area =

Wilderness area in Idaho, United States

- IUCN category Ib (wilderness area)
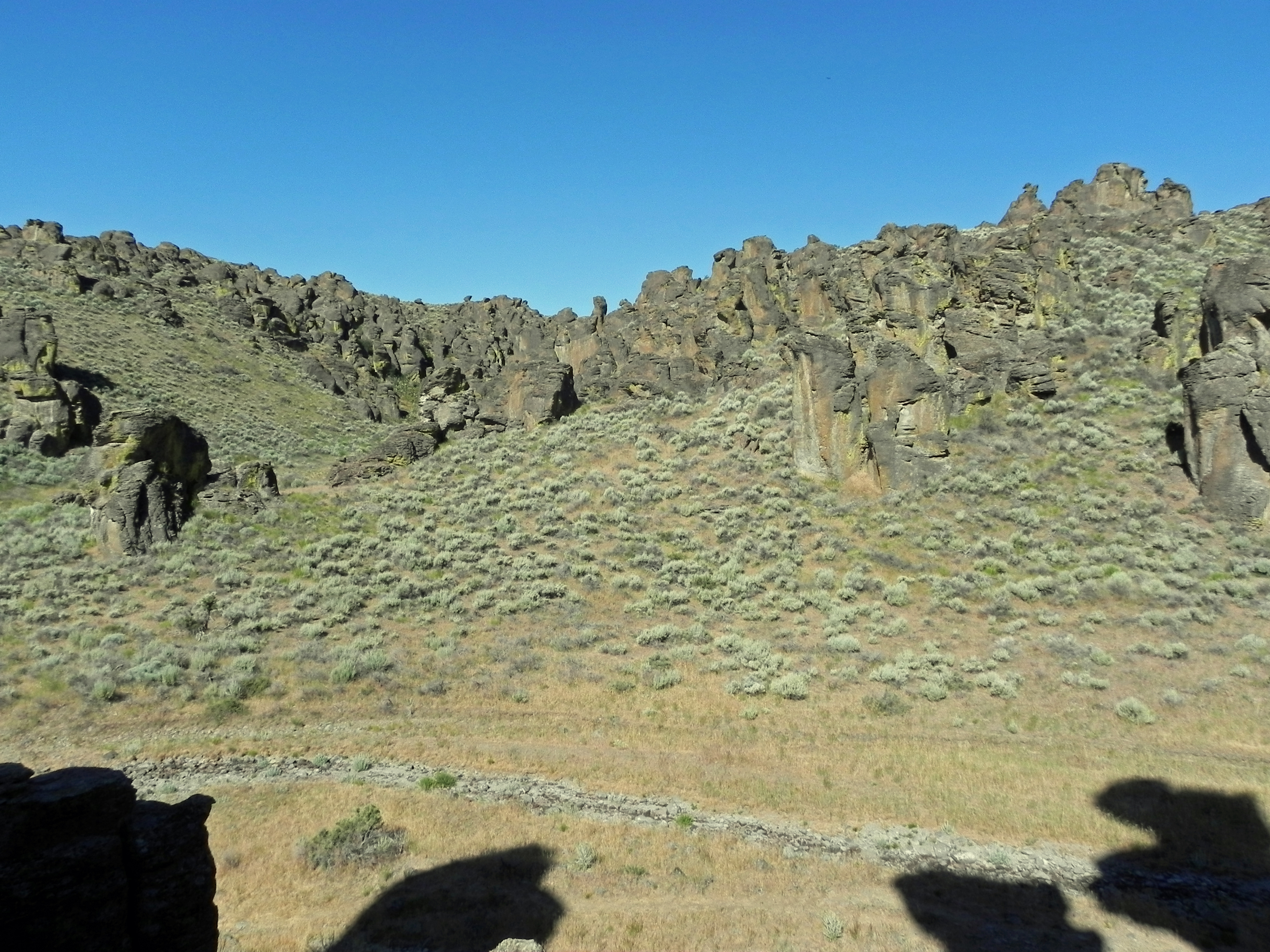

- Location within the United States
- Location: Gooding County, Idaho, United States
- Nearest city: Gooding, ID
- Coordinates: 43°07′09″N 114°41′19″W
- Area: 5,875 acres (2,378 ha)
- Established: 1992
- Governing body: Bureau of Land Management
- Website: Official website

The Little City of Rocks Wilderness Study Area is a Bureau of Land Management wilderness study area in Gooding County, Idaho between the towns of Gooding and Fairfield. The WSA can be accessed via a short dirt road from Idaho State Highway 46. It covers 5,875 acres (2,378 ha) and has a state inholding that covers 640 acres (260 ha). The WSA is located on the Bennett Hills and features a collection of rock features called hoodoos, which cover about 34% of the WSA. The Little City of Rocks WSA is contiguous (but divided by dirt roads) with three other WSAs in the Bennett Hills: Black Canyon, Gooding City of Rocks East, and Gooding City of Rocks West. Portions of the WSA's borders are formed by dirt roads, which also separates it from the Black Canyon WSA.

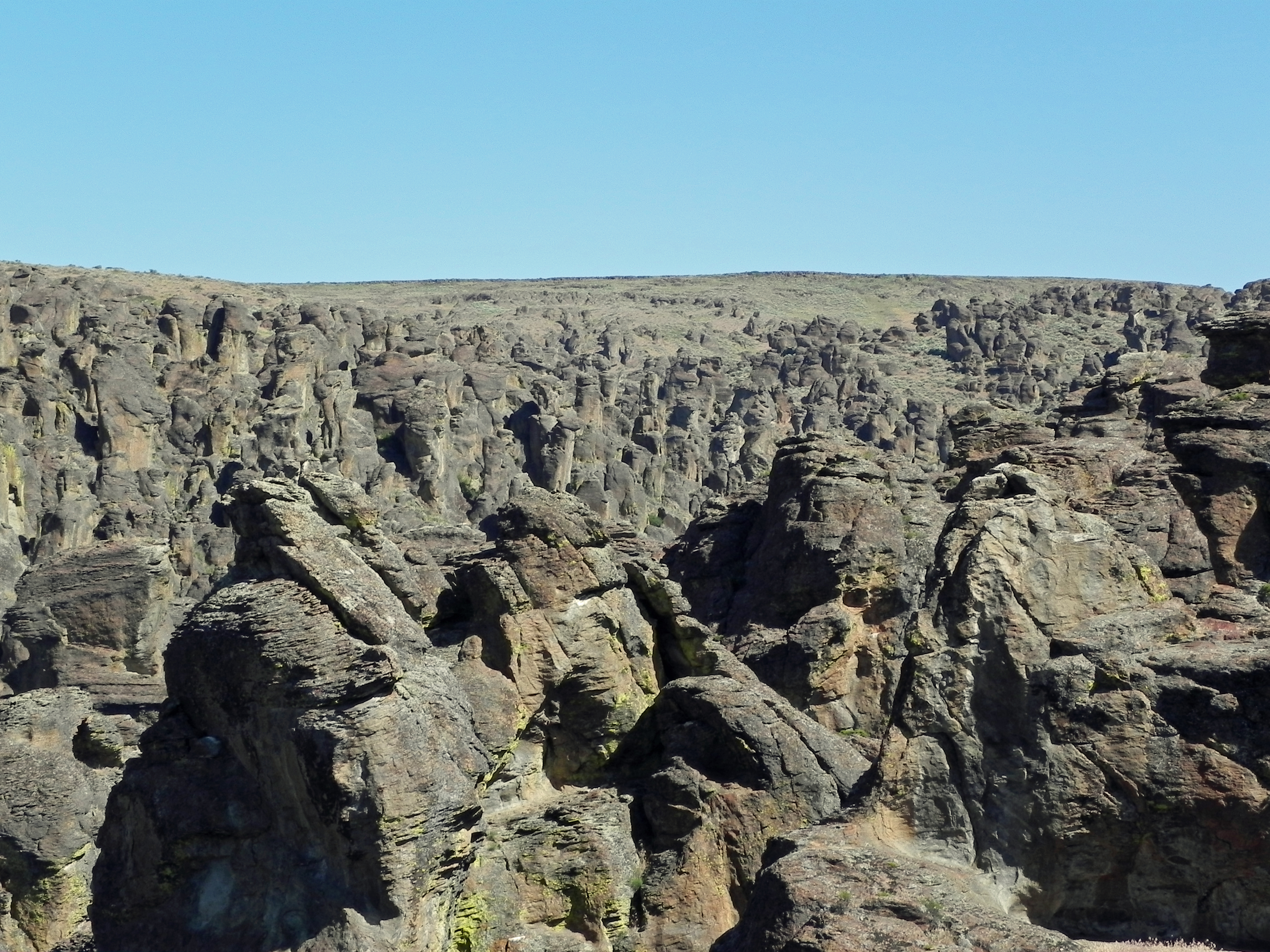
The Little City of Rocks

Sagebrush and grasses are the dominant vegetation in the WSA, although there is a small grove of quaking aspen on a north-facing slope on the WSA's northern edge. Elevations in the WSA range from 4,458 ft (1,359 m) to 5,758 ft (1,755 m). Wildlife that can be found in the WSA include elk, mule deer, coyote, and various birds of prey and upland game. The WSA was not recommended to be included as part of the National Wilderness Preservation System because greater wilderness values can be found in the Gooding City of Rocks East and West WSAs. But the area will remain a WSA until it is released or designated a wilderness area.
