= Black Canyon Wilderness Study Area (Gooding County, Idaho) =

Protected area in the United States

- IUCN category Ib (wilderness area)
- Location within Idaho Location within the United States
- Location: Gooding County, Idaho, United States
- Nearest city: Gooding, ID
- Coordinates: 43.136273°N 114.736687°W
- Area: 10,371 acres (4,197 ha)
- Established: 1992
- Governing body: Bureau of Land Management
- Website: Official website

The Black Canyon Wilderness Study Area is a Bureau of Land Management wilderness study area in Gooding County, Idaho between the towns of Gooding and Fairfield. It covers 10,371 acres (4,197 ha) and has a state inholding that covers 640 acres (260 ha). The WSA is located on the Bennett Hills and features a small collection of rock features called hoodoos. The Black Canyon WSA is contiguous (but divided by dirt roads) with three other WSAs in the Bennett Hills: Little City of Rocks, Gooding City of Rocks East, and Gooding City of Rocks West. Portions of the WSA's borders are formed by dirt roads, which also separates it from the Little City of Rocks and Gooding City of Rocks East WSAs.

The majority of the WSA is flat prairie divided by canyons, but the northern section of the WSA is composed of rolling hills. Willows can be found along some of the intermittent drainages. Elevations in the WSA range from 4,360 ft (1,330 m) to 5,484 ft (1,672 m). Wildlife that can be found in the WSA include elk, mule deer, coyote, and various birds of prey and upland game. Burnt Willow Canyon runs approximately north to south through the WSA. The WSA was not recommended to be included as part of the National Wilderness Preservation System because greater wilderness values can be found in the Gooding City of Rocks East and West WSAs. But the area will remain a WSA until it is released or designated a wilderness area.
