= Wilderness study area =

Type of protected wilderness area in United States

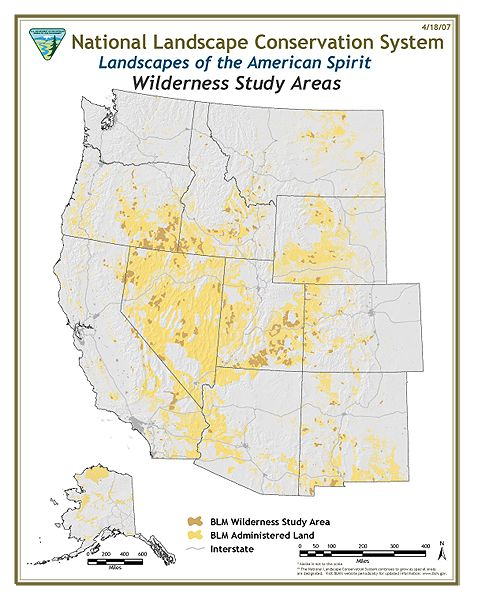
Map of BLM Wilderness Study Areas.

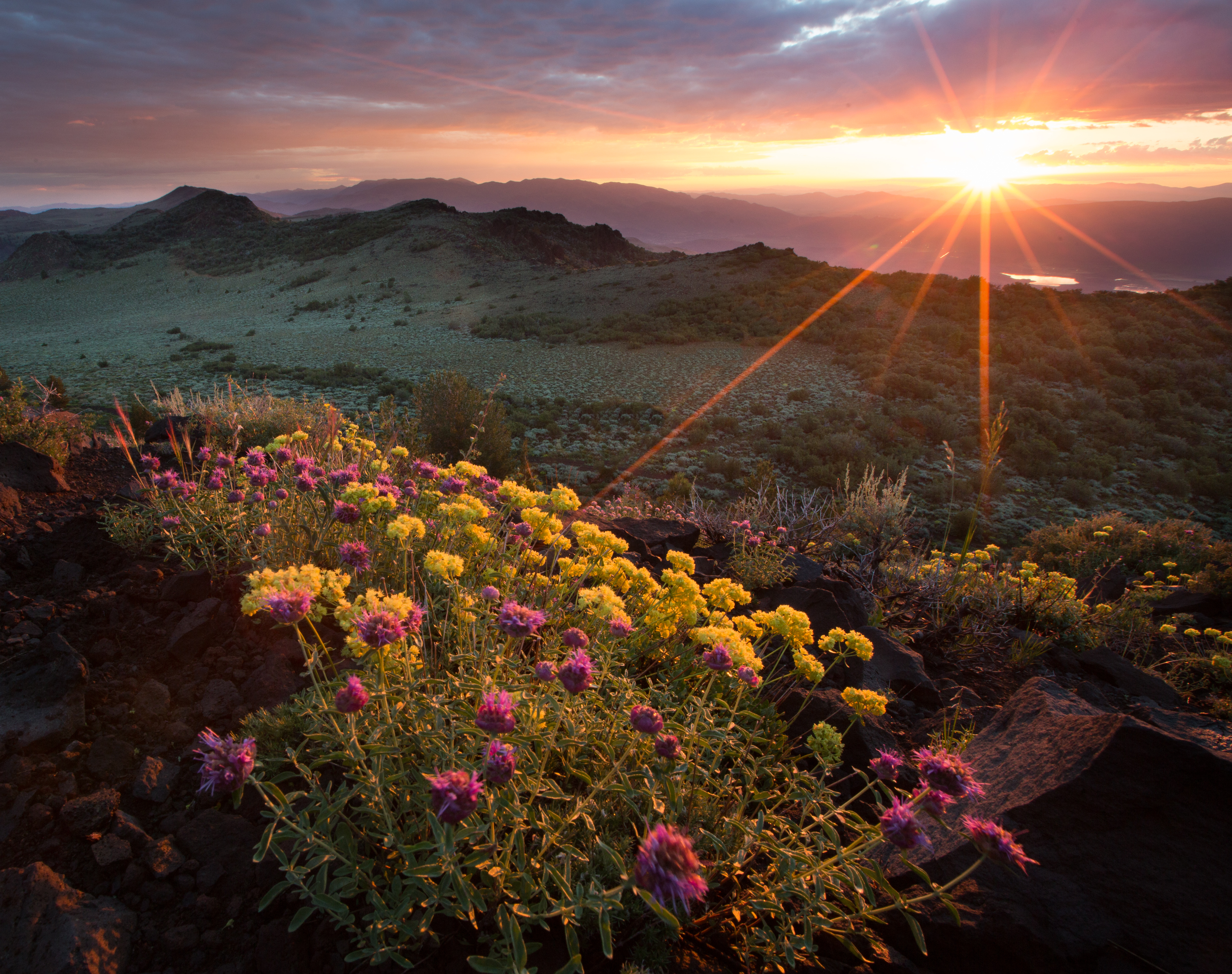
Slinkard BLM Wilderness Study Area, California

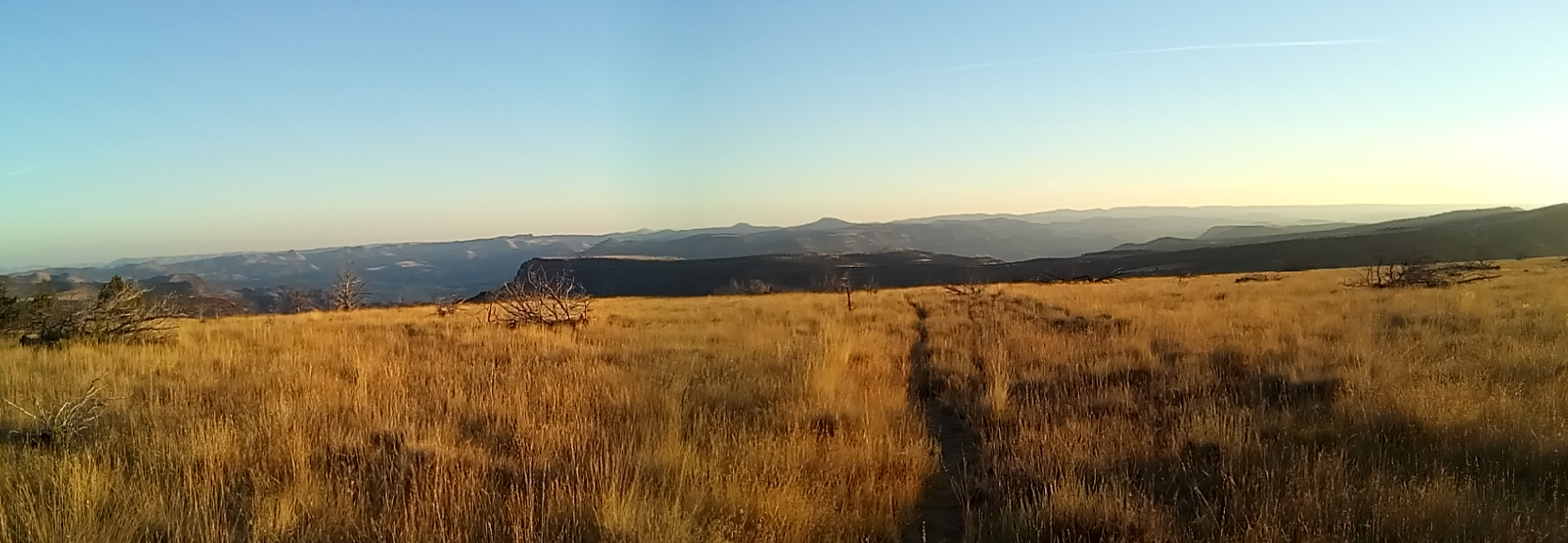
Sutton Mountain BLM Wilderness Study Area, Oregon

A wilderness study area (WSA) contains undeveloped United States federal land retaining its primeval character and influence, without permanent improvements or human habitation, and managed to preserve its natural conditions. The Bureau of Land Management (BLM) manages wilderness study areas under the National Landscape Conservation System to protect their value as wilderness until Congress decides whether to designate them as wilderness, including them in the National Wilderness Preservation System.

On BLM lands, a WSA is a roadless area that has been inventoried (but not designated by Congress) and found to have wilderness characteristics as described in Section 603 of the Federal Land Policy and Management Act of 1976 and Section 2(c) of the Wilderness Act of 1964. Wilderness Study Area characteristics are:

- Size – roadless areas of at least 5,000 acres (2,000 ha) of public lands or of a manageable size
- Naturalness – generally appears to have been affected primarily by the forces of nature rather than human activity
- Opportunities – provides outstanding opportunities for solitude or primitive and unconfined types of recreation

Wilderness bills often include so-called "release language" that eliminates WSAs not selected for wilderness designation.

Some WSAs are managed in exactly the same manner as wilderness areas, a specific government designation and not synonymous with the natural state of wilderness. Some areas permit activities that are generally excluded from wildernesses, such as mountain biking and off-roading.

As of 2023, there are 487 BLM wilderness study areas in the United States, with a total area of 11,118,496 acres (4,499,496 ha). The highest number of WSAs in any single U.S. state is 87 (2,645,103 acres) in Oregon. In terms of size, the state of Utah is home to the most BLM acres (2,795,574) in the United States.

== See also ==
- Landscape
- List of wilderness study areas
- National forest (United States)
- Natural landscape
- Protected areas of the United States
