= Lookout Peak (Colorado) =

Mountain in the state of Colorado

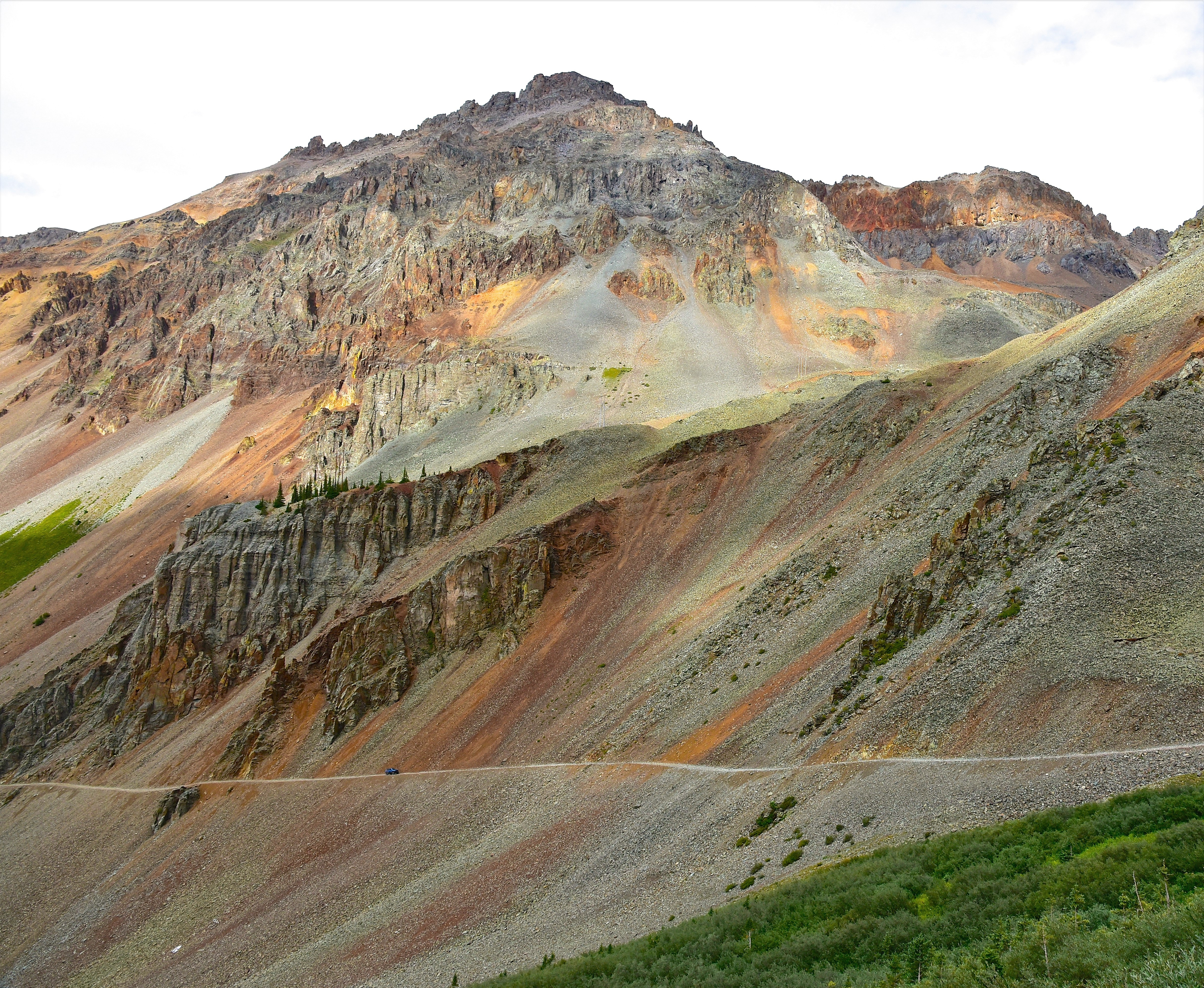
- South aspect from Ophir Pass

Highest point
- Elevation: 13,661 ft (4,164 m)
- Prominence: 821 ft (250 m)
- Parent peak: Ulysses S Grant Peak (13,767 ft)
- Isolation: 3.0 mi (4.8 km)
- Coordinates: 37°51′44″N 107°46′49″W

Geography
- Location within Colorado Location within the United States
- Location: San Juan / San Miguel counties Colorado, US
- Parent range: Rocky Mountains; San Juan Mountains
- Topo map: USGS Ophir

Geology
- Rock type: Extrusive rock

Climbing
- Easiest route: class 3

Lookout Peak is a 13,661-foot-elevation (4,164-meter) mountain summit located on the shared boundary of San Juan County with San Miguel County, in southwest Colorado, United States. It is situated three miles east of the community of Ophir, and one mile immediately north of Ophir Pass, on land managed by San Juan National Forest and Uncompahgre National Forest. Lookout Peak is part of the San Juan Mountains which are a subset of the Rocky Mountains, and is west of the Continental Divide. It ranks as the 166th-highest peak in Colorado, and topographic relief is significant as the west aspect rises 3,000 feet (910 meters) in approximately one mile. Neighbors include Silver Mountain three miles to the west-northwest, Wasatch Mountain two miles north-northwest, and Golden Horn five miles south-southwest. The mountain's name, which has been officially adopted by the United States Board on Geographic Names, was in use in 1899 when Henry Gannett published it in A Dictionary of Altitudes in the United States, and in 1906 when he published it in A Gazetteer of Colorado.

== Climate ==
According to the Köppen climate classification system, Lookout Peak is located in an alpine subarctic climate zone with long, cold, snowy winters, and cool to warm summers. Due to its altitude, it receives precipitation all year, as snow in winter, and as thunderstorms in summer, with a dry period in late spring. Precipitation runoff from the mountain drains west into tributaries of the San Miguel River, and east to the Animas River via Mineral Creek.

== See also ==
- Mountains of San Juan County, Colorado
- Mountains of San Miguel County, Colorado
