= Pilot Knob (Colorado) =

Mountain summit in southwest Colorado

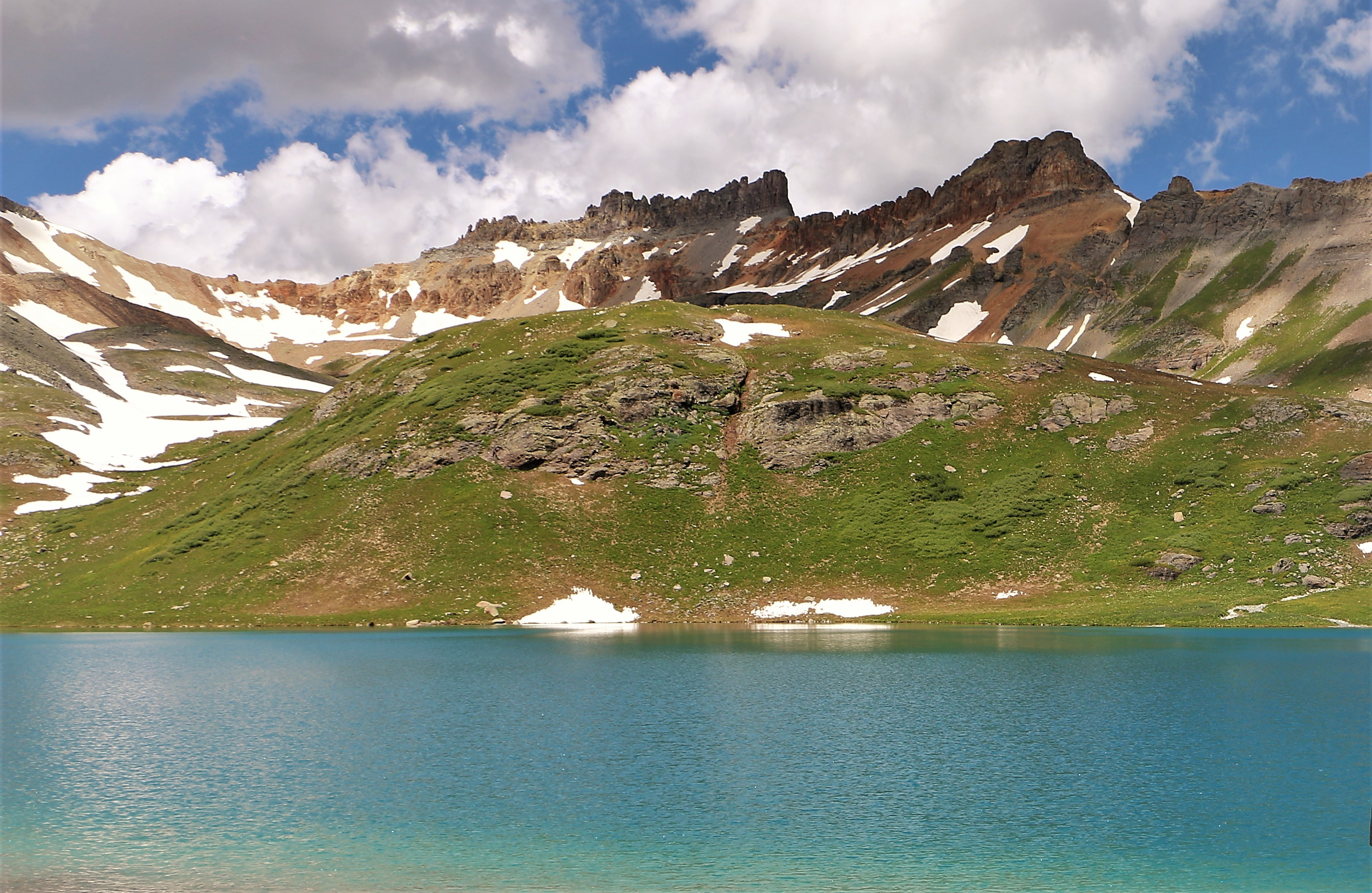
- East aspect, from Ice Lake

Highest point
- Elevation: 13,738 ft (4,187 m)
- Prominence: 378 ft (115 m)
- Parent peak: Golden Horn (13,780 ft)
- Isolation: 0.51 mi (0.82 km)
- Coordinates: 37°48′42″N 107°49′44″W

Geography
- Location within Colorado Location within the United States
- Location: San Juan / San Miguel counties Colorado, US
- Parent range: Rocky Mountains; San Juan Mountains
- Topo map: USGS Ophir

Geology
- Rock type: Extrusive rock

Climbing
- Easiest route: class 3+ scrambling

Pilot Knob is a 13,738-foot-elevation (4,187-meter) mountain summit located on the shared boundary of San Juan County with San Miguel County, in southwest Colorado, United States. It is situated nine miles west of the community of Silverton, on land managed by San Juan National Forest and Uncompahgre National Forest. Pilot Knob is part of the San Juan Mountains which are a subset of the Rocky Mountains, and is west of the Continental Divide. It ranks as the 132nd-highest peak in Colorado, and topographic relief is significant as the west aspect rises 4,000 feet (1,200 meters) above Trout Lake in three miles. Neighbors include Ulysses S Grant Peak 1.5 mile to the northeast, and Golden Horn one-half mile to the southeast. The mountain's name, which has been officially adopted by the United States Board on Geographic Names, was listed by Henry Gannett when he published A Gazetteer of Colorado in 1906. The peak is considered one of the most difficult to climb in Colorado because of its poor quality volcanic rock.

== Climate ==
According to the Köppen climate classification system, Pilot Knob is located in an alpine subarctic climate zone with long, cold, snowy winters, and cool to warm summers. Due to its altitude, it receives precipitation all year, as snow in winter, and as thunderstorms in summer, with a dry period in late spring. Precipitation runoff from the mountain drains west into tributaries of the San Miguel River, and east to the Animas River via Mineral Creek.

== Gallery ==
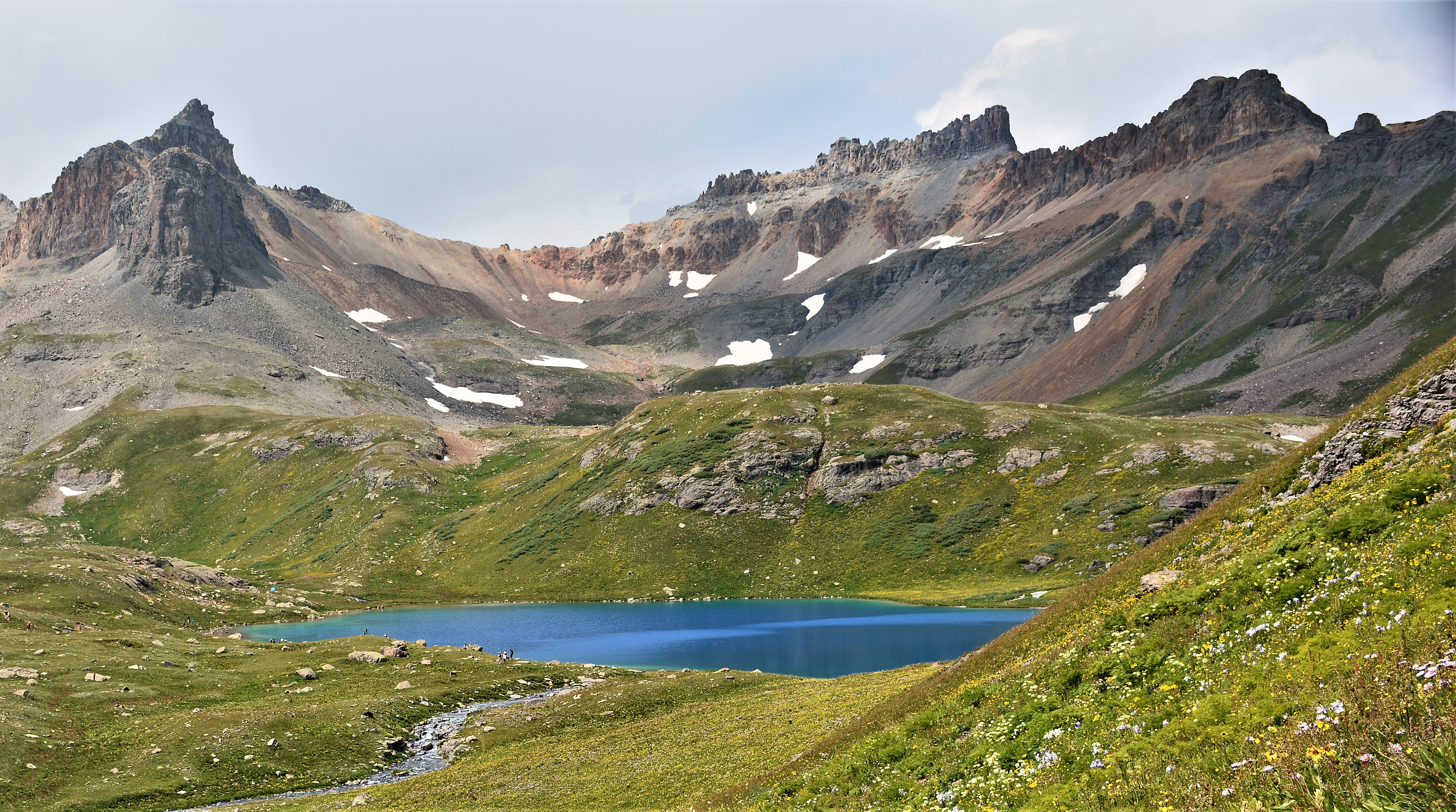
Pilot Knob right of center, Golden Horn to left, above Ice Lake Basin.

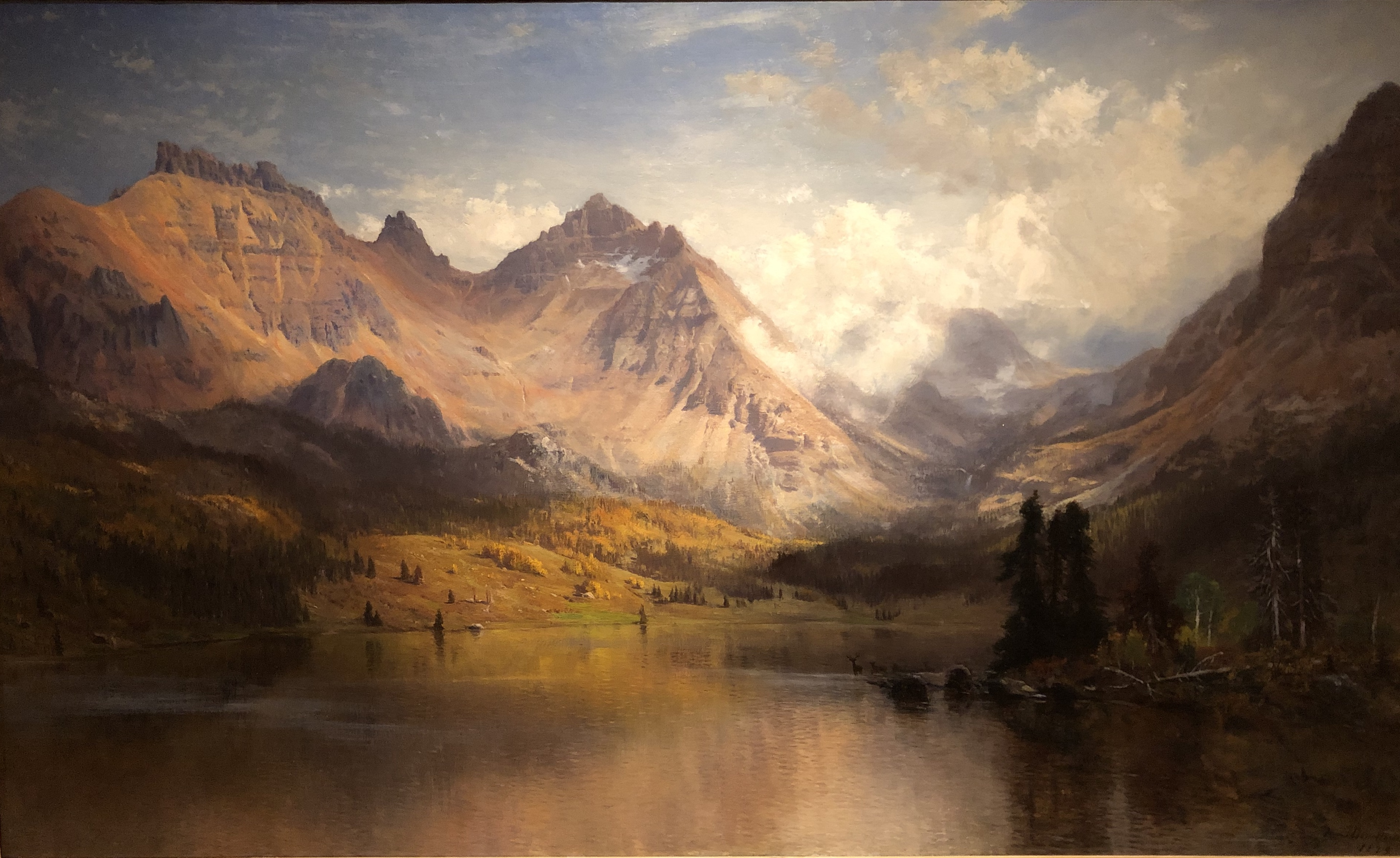
Pilot Knob upper left, from Trout Lake. Vermilion Peak centered.
An 1879 painting by Hamilton Hamilton.

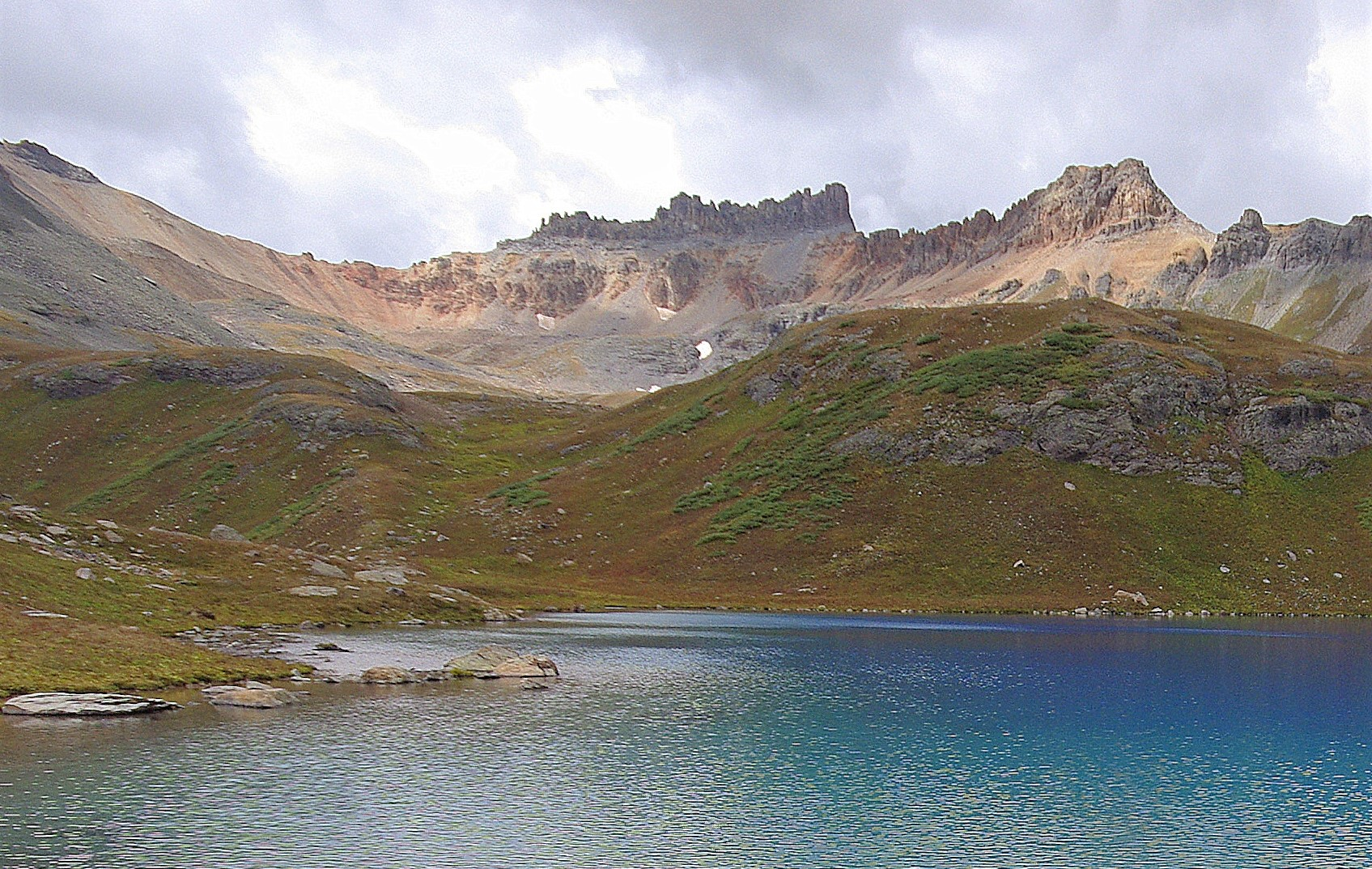
Pilot Knob (centered) from Ice Lake

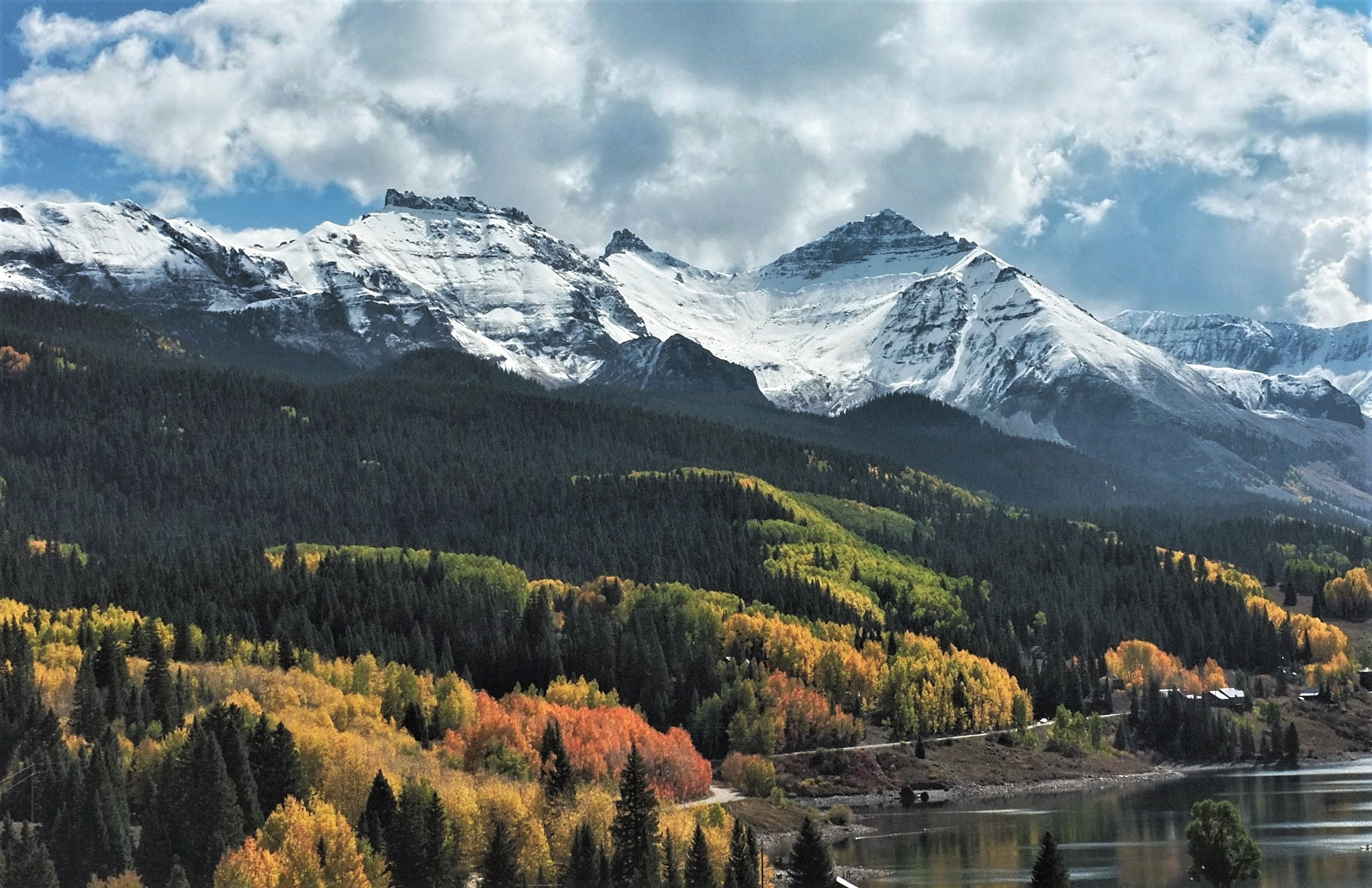
Pilot Knob (left), Golden Horn, and Vermilion Peak at Trout Lake

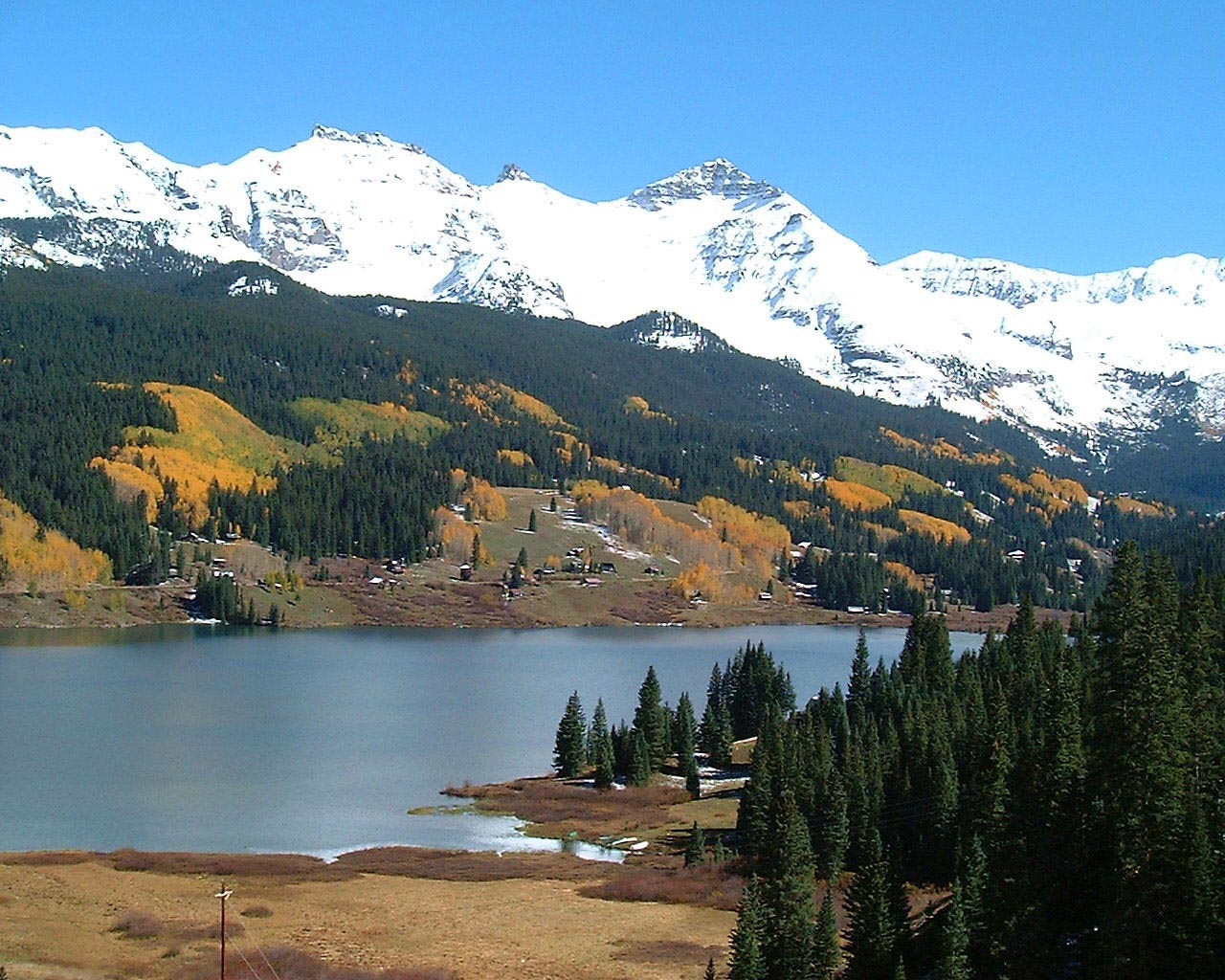
Plot Knob (left) from Trout Lake

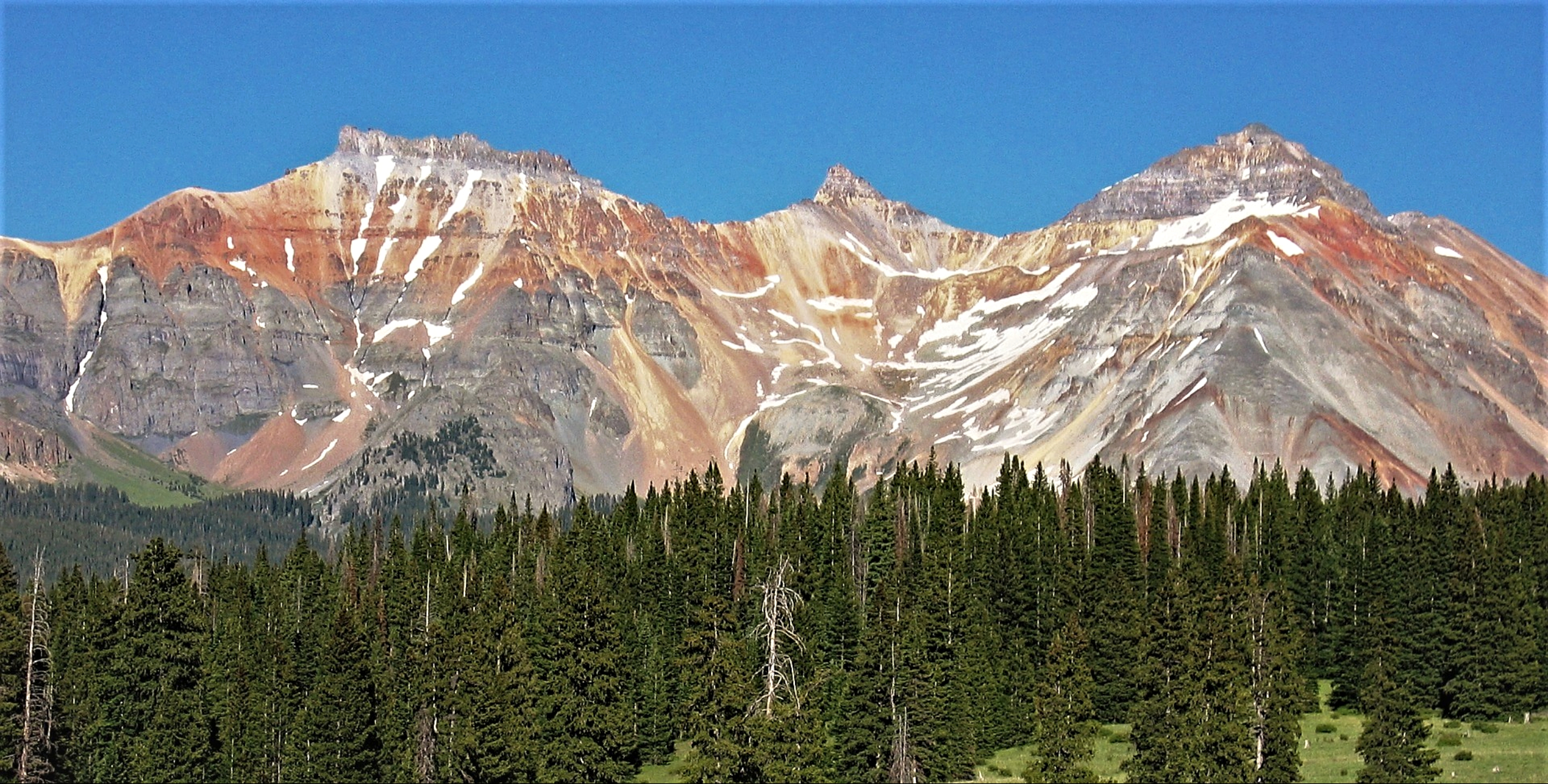
Pilot Knob (left), Golden Horn, and Vermilion Peak

== See also ==
- Mountains of San Juan County, Colorado
- Mountains of San Miguel County, Colorado
