= Sheep Mountain (San Miguel and Dolores Counties, Colorado) =

Mountain in the American state of Colorado

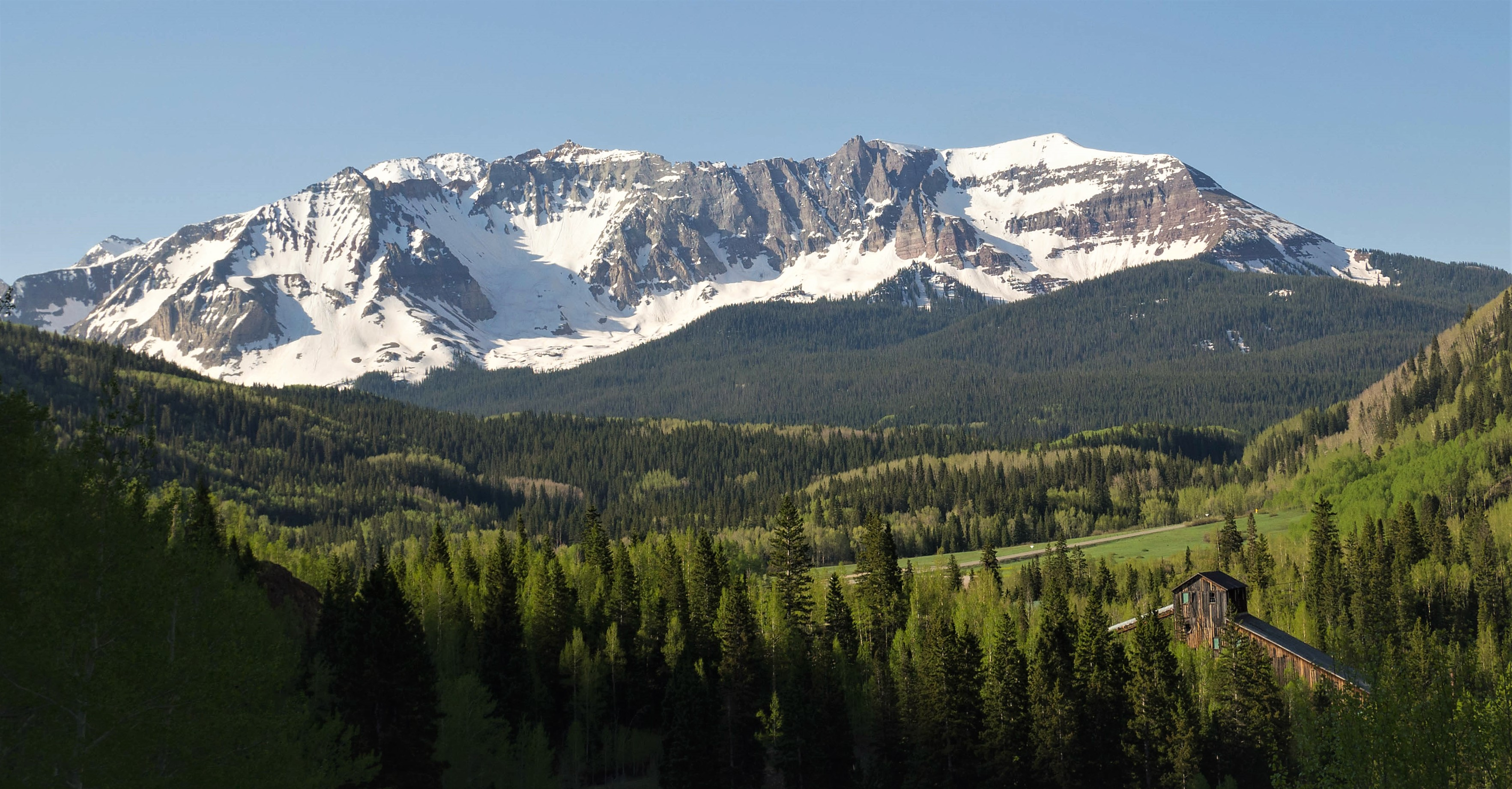
- North aspect

Highest point
- Elevation: 13,188 ft (4,020 m)
- Prominence: 108 ft (33 m)
- Parent peak: San Miguel Peak (13,752 ft)
- Isolation: 1.24 mi (2.00 km)
- Coordinates: 37°47′07″N 107°53′09″W

Geography
- Location within Colorado Location within the United States
- Location: Dolores / San Miguel counties Colorado, US
- Parent range: Rocky Mountains; San Juan Mountains
- Topo map: USGS Mount Wilson

Geology
- Rock type: Extrusive rock

Sheep Mountain is a 13,188-foot-elevation (4,020-meter) mountain summit located on the shared boundary of Dolores County with San Miguel County, in southwest Colorado, United States. It is situated three miles south of Trout Lake and two miles southeast of Lizard Head Pass, on land managed by San Juan National Forest and Uncompahgre National Forest. Sheep Mountain is part of the San Juan Mountains which are a subset of the Rocky Mountains, and is west of the Continental Divide. Topographic relief is significant as the southwest aspect rises 3,200 feet (980 meters) above the Dolores River in approximately 2.5 miles. Neighbors include Golden Horn and Vermilion Peak to the east, and Lizard Head to the northwest. Sheep Mountain can be seen from the San Juan Skyway in the Lizard Head Pass and Trout Lake areas. The mountain's name, which has been officially adopted by the United States Board on Geographic Names, was in use in 1906 when Henry Gannett published it in A Gazetteer of Colorado.

== Climate ==
According to the Köppen climate classification system, Sheep Mountain is located in an alpine subarctic climate zone with cold, snowy winters, and cool to warm summers. Due to its altitude, it receives precipitation all year, as snow in winter, and as thunderstorms in summer, with a dry period in late spring. Precipitation runoff from the mountain drains south into the nearby Dolores River, and north into tributaries of the San Miguel River.

== Gallery ==
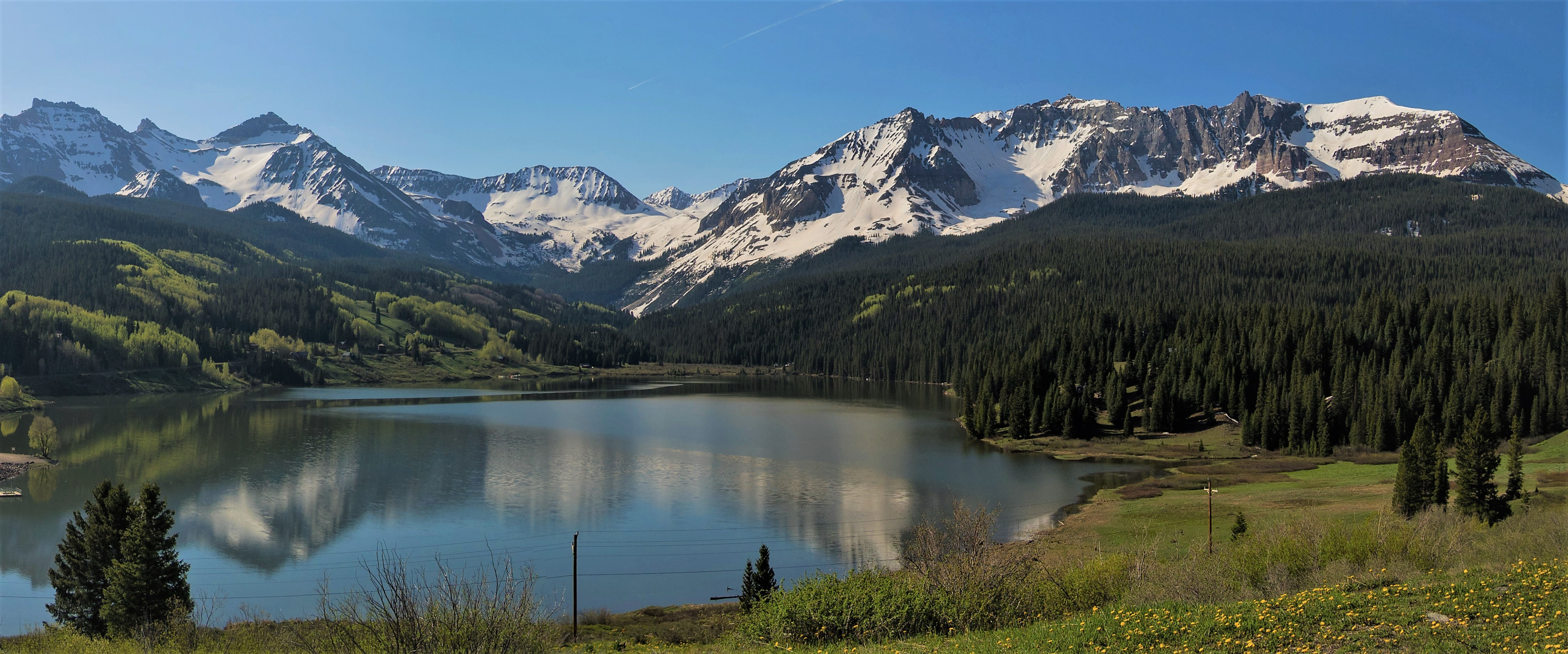
Sheep Mountain to right, with Trout Lake

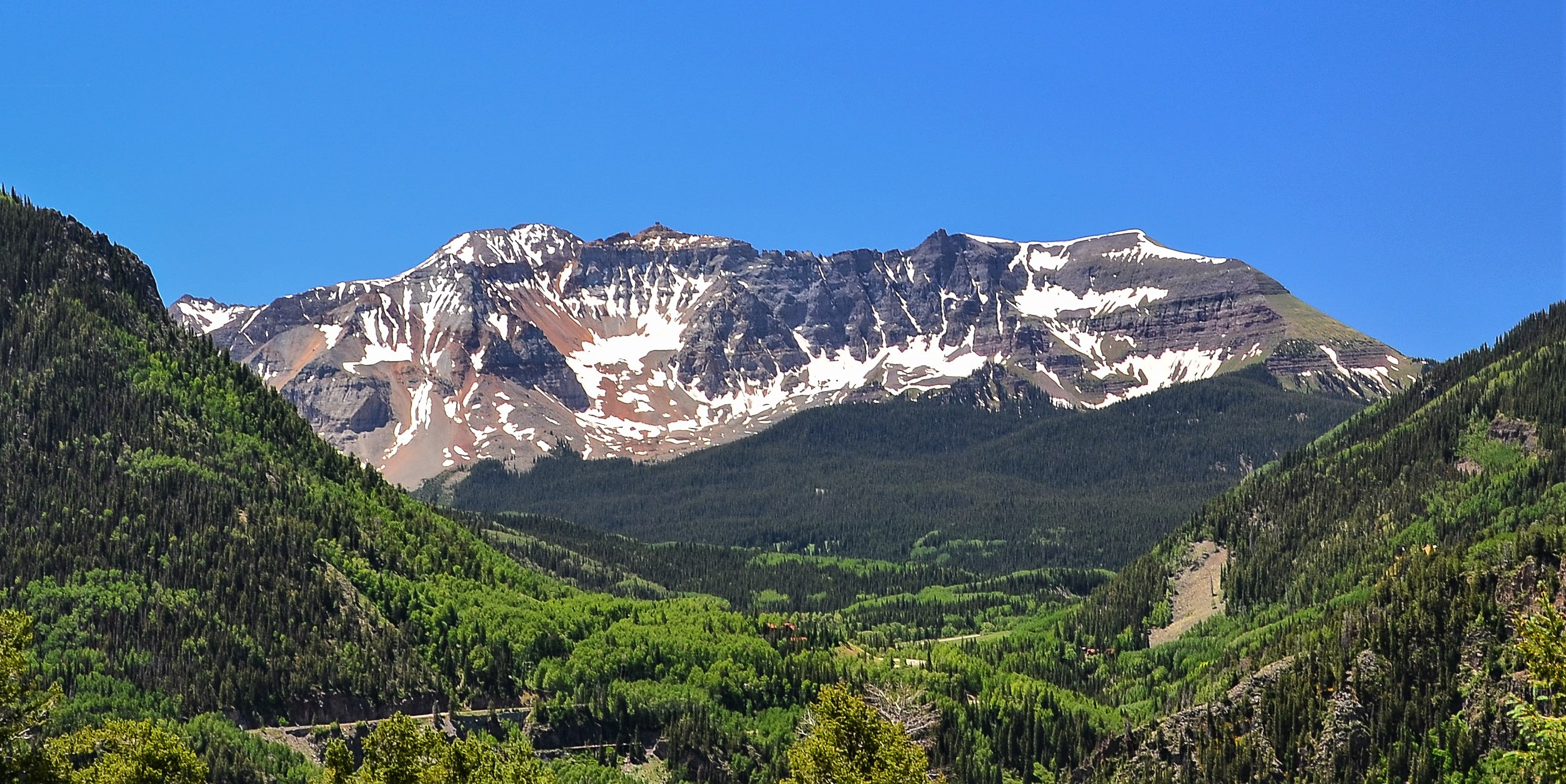
North aspect

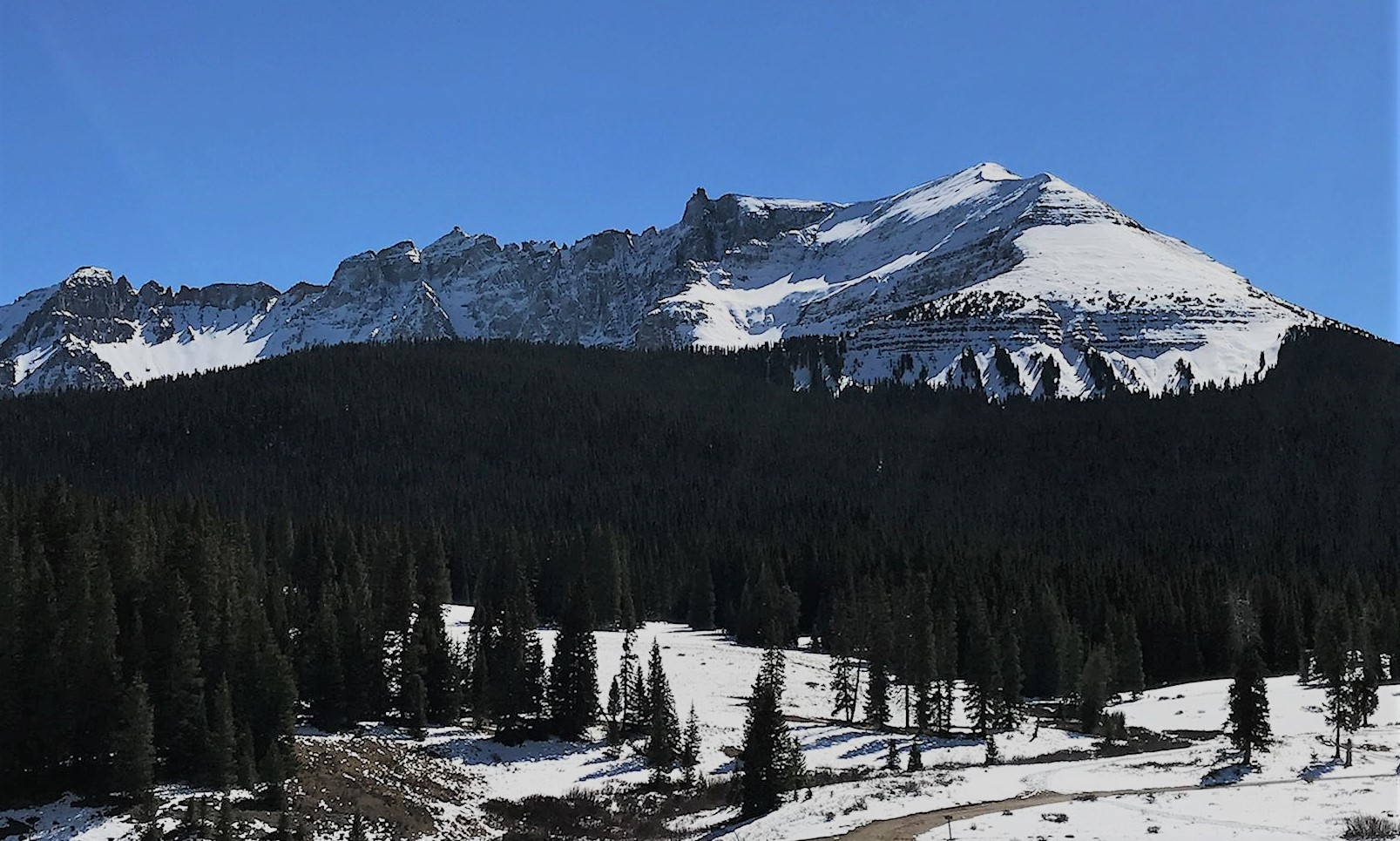
Sheep Mountain from Lizard Head Pass

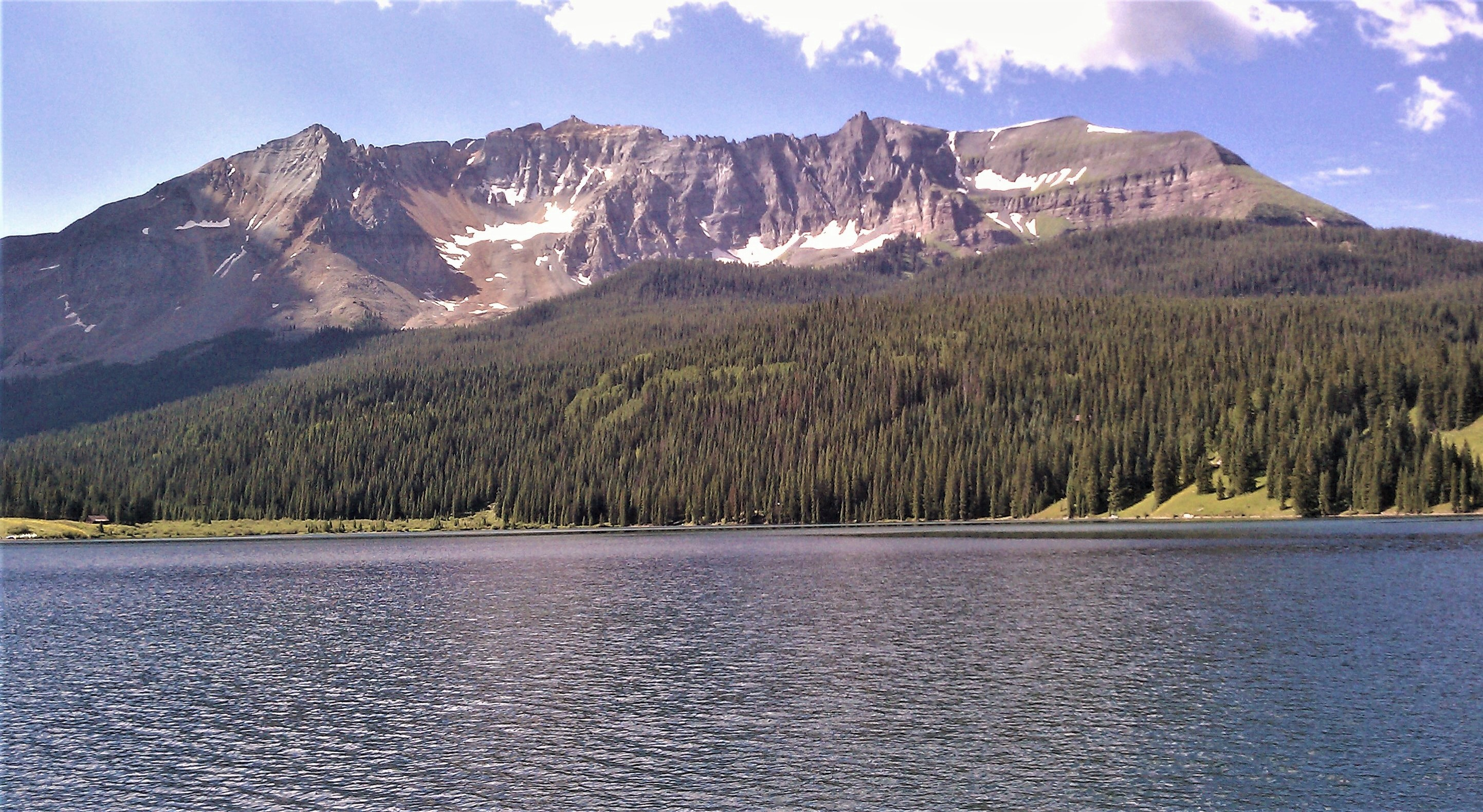
Sheep Mountain from Trout Lake

== See also ==
- Mountains of Dolores County, Colorado
- Mountains of San Miguel County, Colorado
