= Palmyra Peak =

Mountain in the state of Colorado

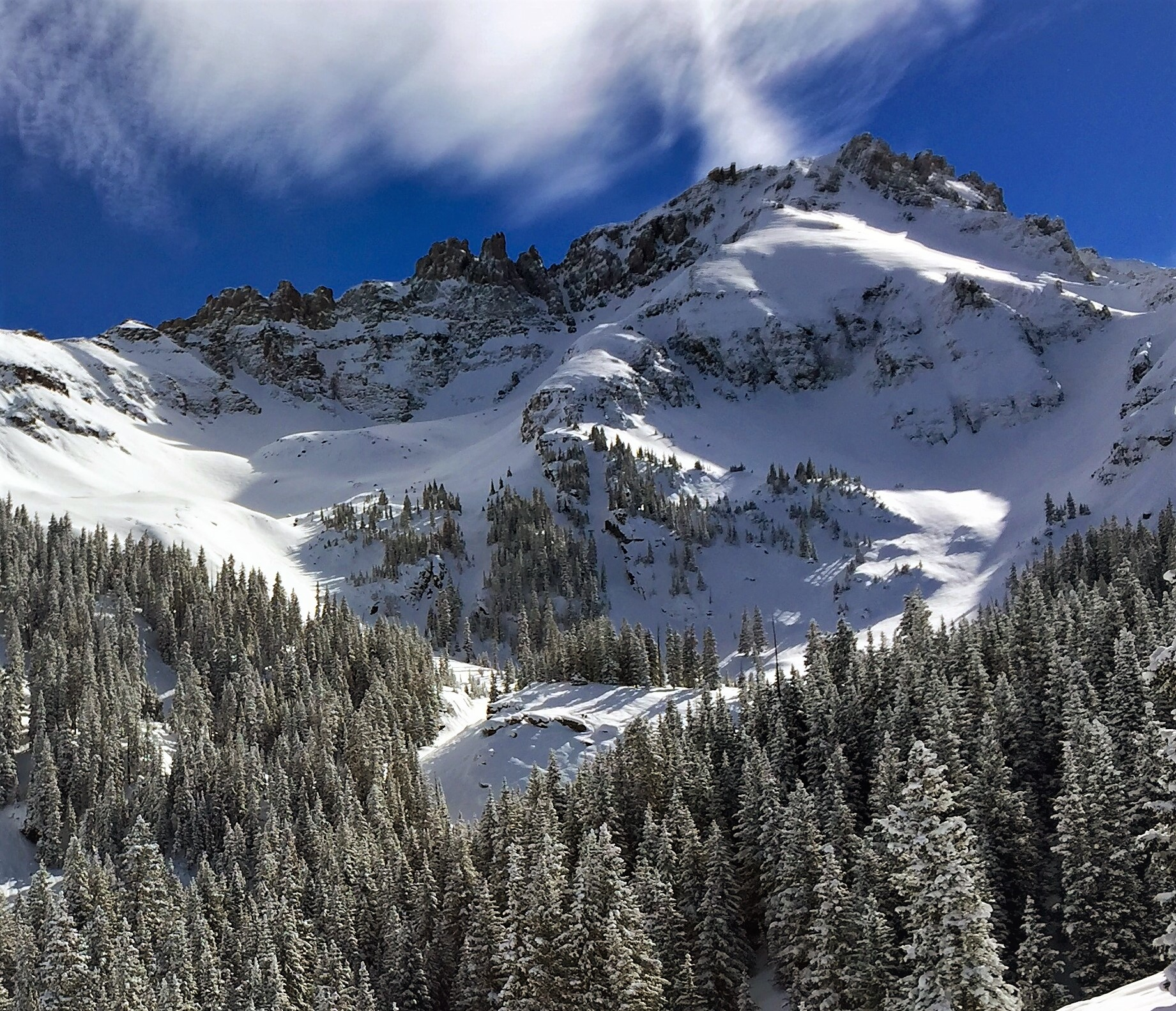
- North aspect, above Prospect Basin

Highest point
- Elevation: 13,319 ft (4,060 m)
- Prominence: 159 ft (48 m)
- Parent peak: Silver Mountain (13,470 ft)
- Isolation: 0.46 mi (0.74 km)
- Coordinates: 37°53′01″N 107°49′45″W

Geography
- Location within Colorado Location within the United States
- Location: San Miguel County; Colorado, US
- Parent range: Rocky Mountains; San Juan Mountains
- Topo map: USGS Telluride

Geology
- Rock age: Tertiary
- Rock type: Extrusive rock

Climbing
- Easiest route: class 2+

Palmyra Peak is a 13,319-foot-elevation (4,060-meter) mountain summit located in San Miguel County of southwest Colorado, United States. It is situated four miles south of the town of Telluride, on land managed by Uncompahgre National Forest. It is part of the San Juan Mountains which are a subset of the Rocky Mountains, and is west of the Continental Divide. It is immediately south of Telluride Ski Resort, from which it is a prominent landmark, and Palmyra has the distinction of having the highest inbounds skiing terrain of any North American ski resort. Topographic relief is significant as the north aspect rises 2,300 feet (700 meters) above Prospect Basin in one mile, and the west aspect rises 2,100 feet above Alta Lakes in one-half mile. The mountain's name has been officially adopted by the United States Board on Geographic Names in association with the Palmyra Mine, a gold and silver mine located at an elevation of 11,650-feet on the peak's western aspect. Other mines on its flanks included Lakeview Mine, Mountain Quail Mine, Roy Johnston mine, and Turkey Creek Mine.

== Climate ==
According to the Köppen climate classification system, Palmyra Peak is located in an alpine subarctic climate zone with cold, snowy winters, and cool to warm summers. Due to its altitude, it receives precipitation all year, as snow in winter, and as thunderstorms in summer, with a dry period in late spring. Precipitation runoff from the mountain drains into Bear Creek and Prospect Creek which are both tributaries of the San Miguel River.

== See also ==
- Mountains of San Miguel County, Colorado

== Gallery ==
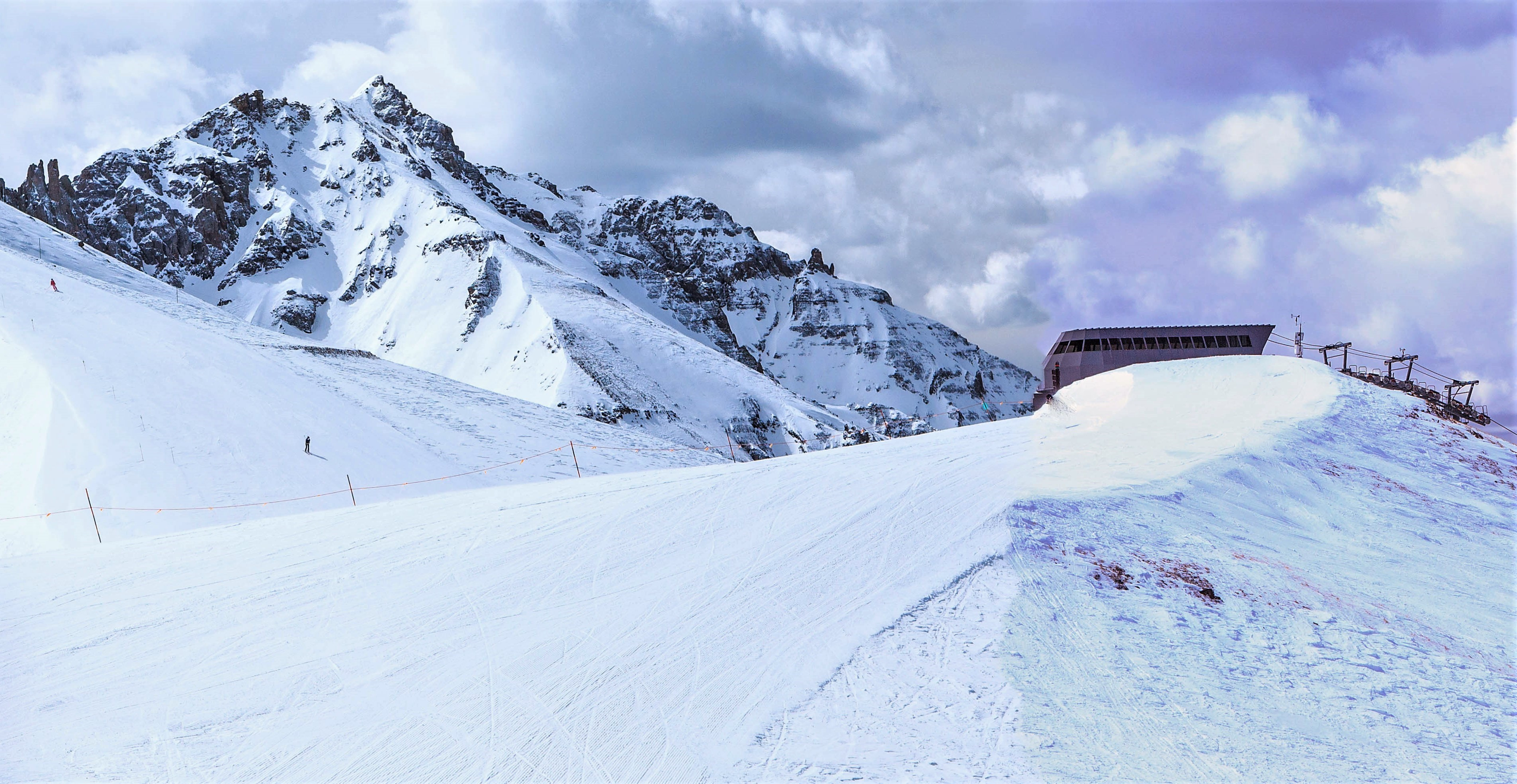
Palmyra Peak seen from the top of the Gold Hill Express in Telluride Ski Resort

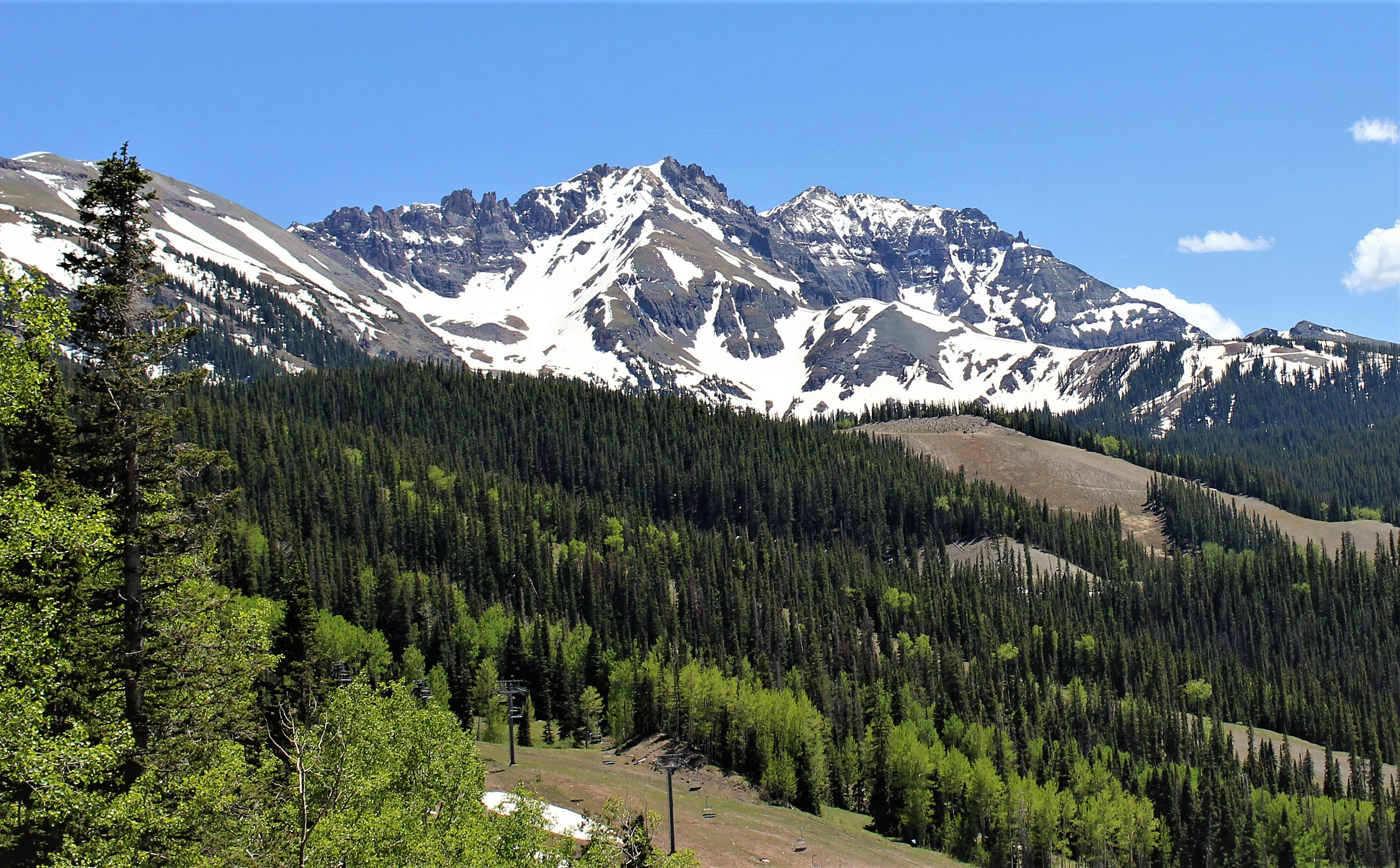
Palmyra Peak lined up with parent Silver Mountain behind

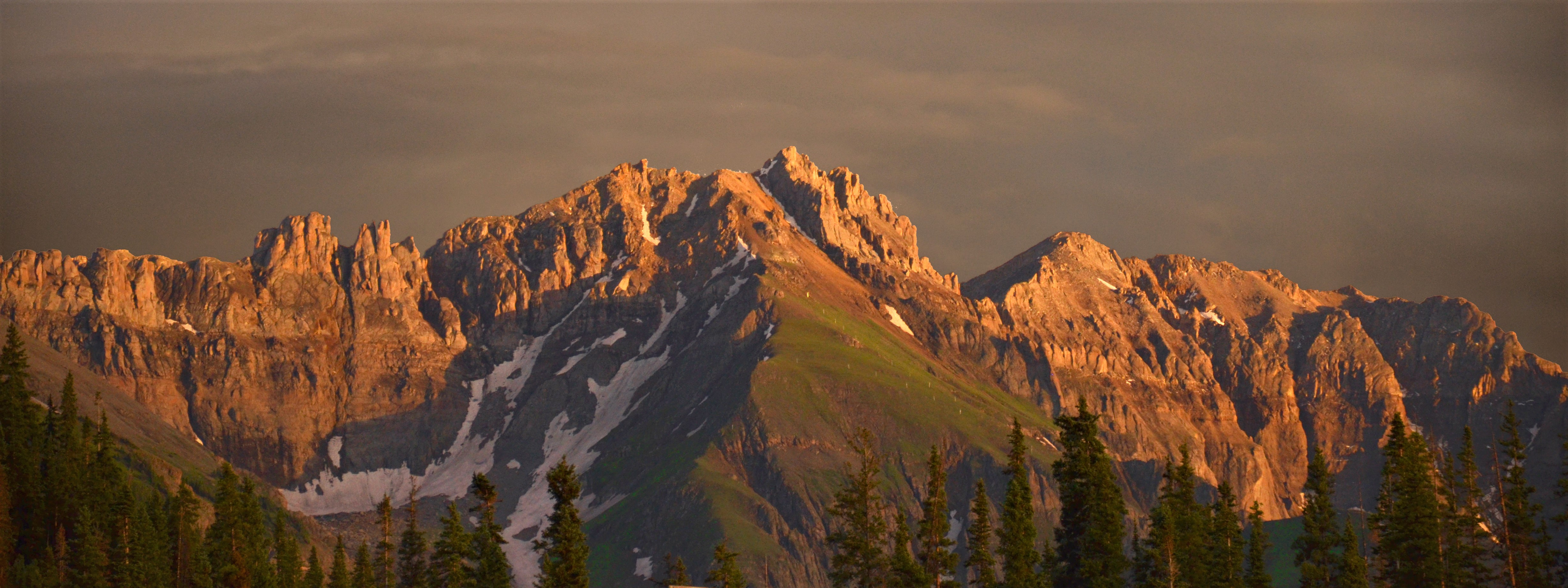
Sunset on Palmyra Peak and Silver Mountain

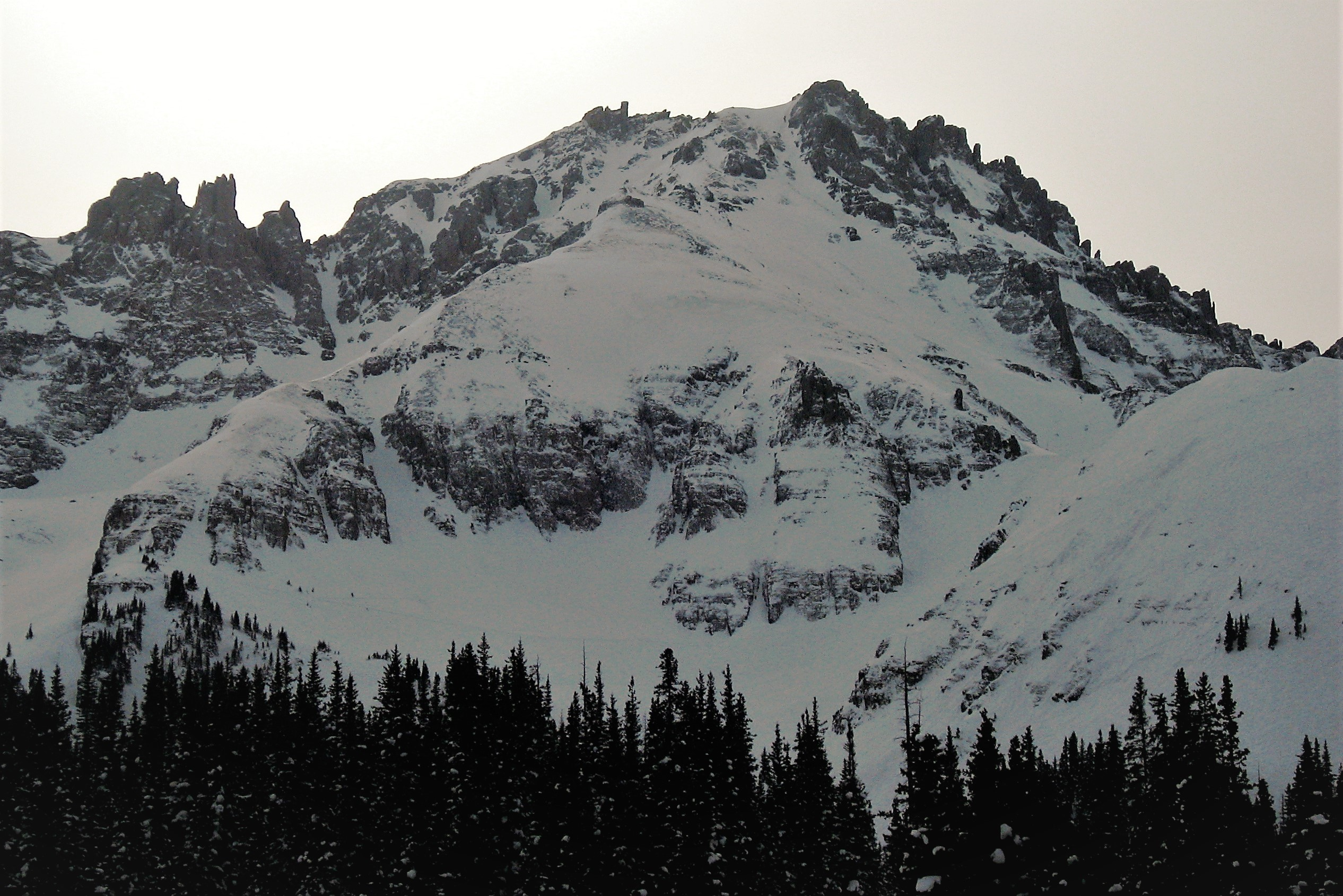

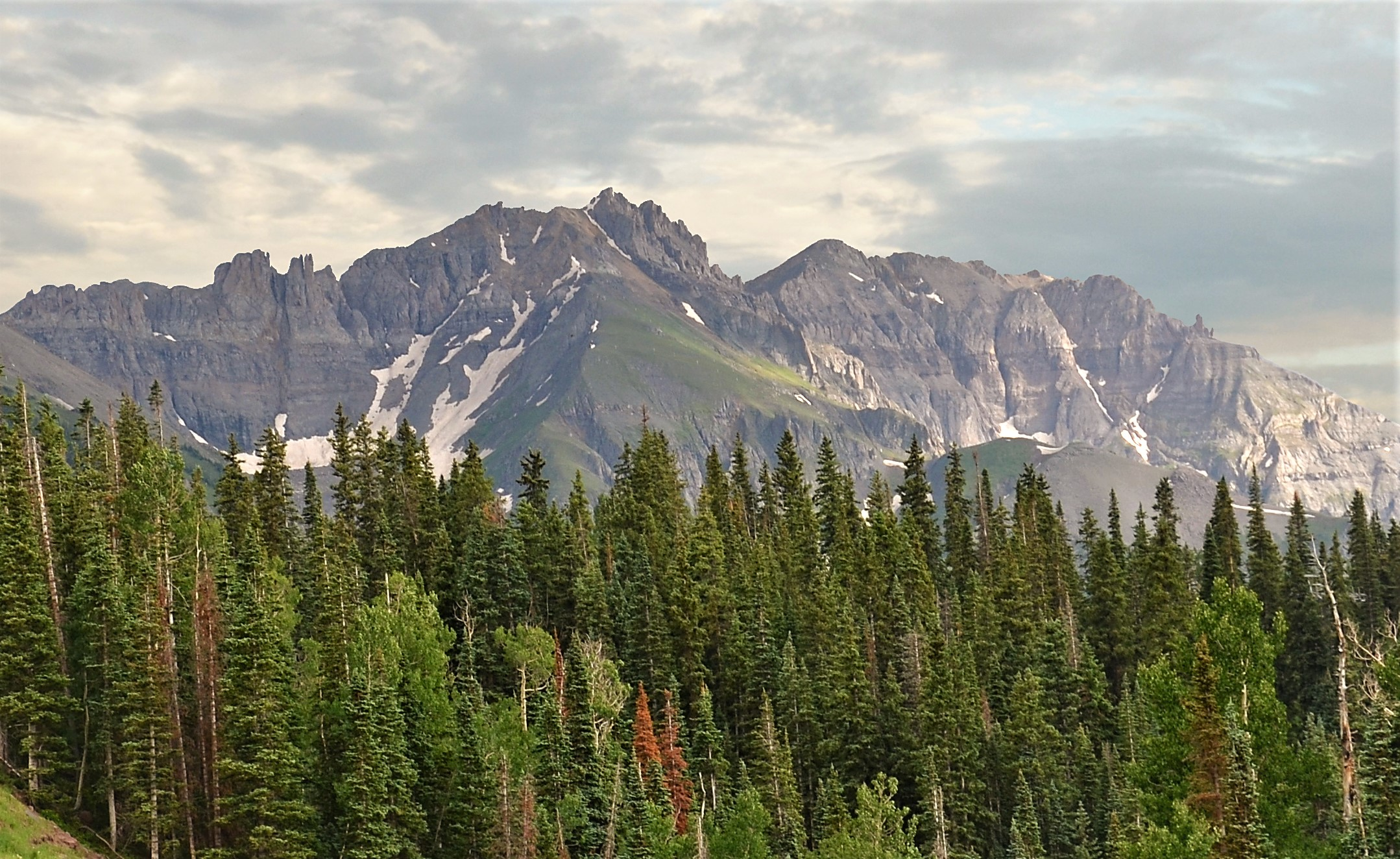
Palmyra Peak with parent Silver Mountain behind

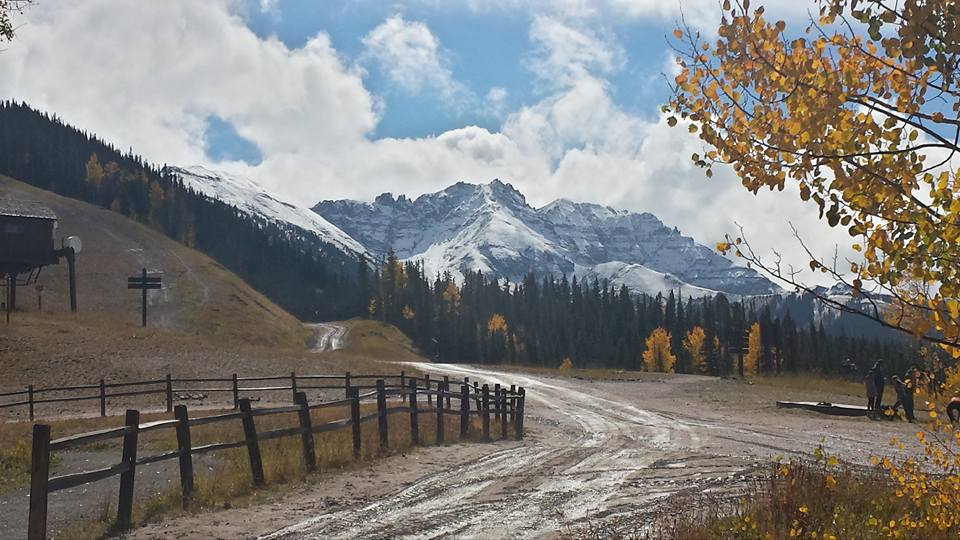
