= Silver Mountain (San Miguel County, Colorado) =

Mountain in Colorado, United States

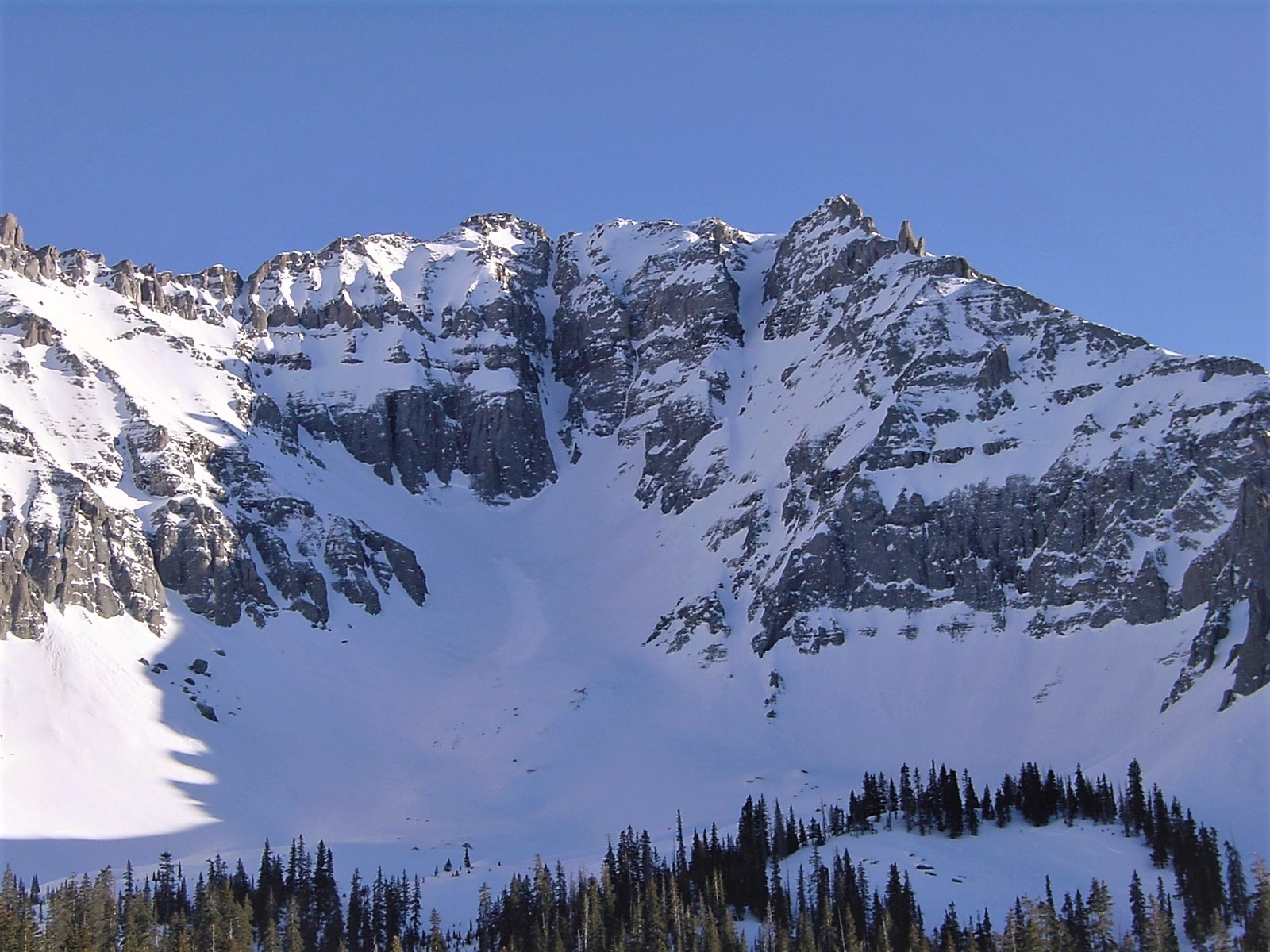
- Summit seen from the northwest

Highest point
- Elevation: 13,470 ft (4,110 m)
- Prominence: 390 ft (120 m)
- Parent peak: Wasatch Mountain (13,555 ft)
- Isolation: 2.14 mi (3.44 km)
- Coordinates: 37°52′37″N 107°49′53″W

Geography
- Location within Colorado Location within the United States
- Location: San Miguel County; Colorado, US
- Parent range: Rocky Mountains; San Juan Mountains
- Topo map: USGS Telluride

Geology
- Rock age: Tertiary
- Rock type: Extrusive rock

Climbing
- Easiest route: class 2+

Silver Mountain is a 13,470-foot-elevation (4,110-meter) mountain summit located in San Miguel County of southwest Colorado, United States. It is situated 4.5 miles south of the town of Telluride, on land managed by Uncompahgre National Forest. It is part of the San Juan Mountains which are a subset of the Rocky Mountains, and is west of the Continental Divide. Silver Mountain ranks as the 274th-highest peak in Colorado, and topographic relief is significant as the south aspect rises 3,770 feet above Ophir in 1.5 mile. The mountain's name has been officially adopted by the United States Board on Geographic Names in association with silver mines on the peak's flanks.

== Climate ==
According to the Köppen climate classification system, Silver Mountain is located in an alpine subarctic climate zone with cold, snowy winters, and cool to warm summers. Due to its altitude, it receives precipitation all year, as snow in winter, and as thunderstorms in summer, with a dry period in late spring. Precipitation runoff from the mountain drains into tributaries of the San Miguel River.

== See also ==
- Palmyra Peak
- Mountains of San Miguel County, Colorado

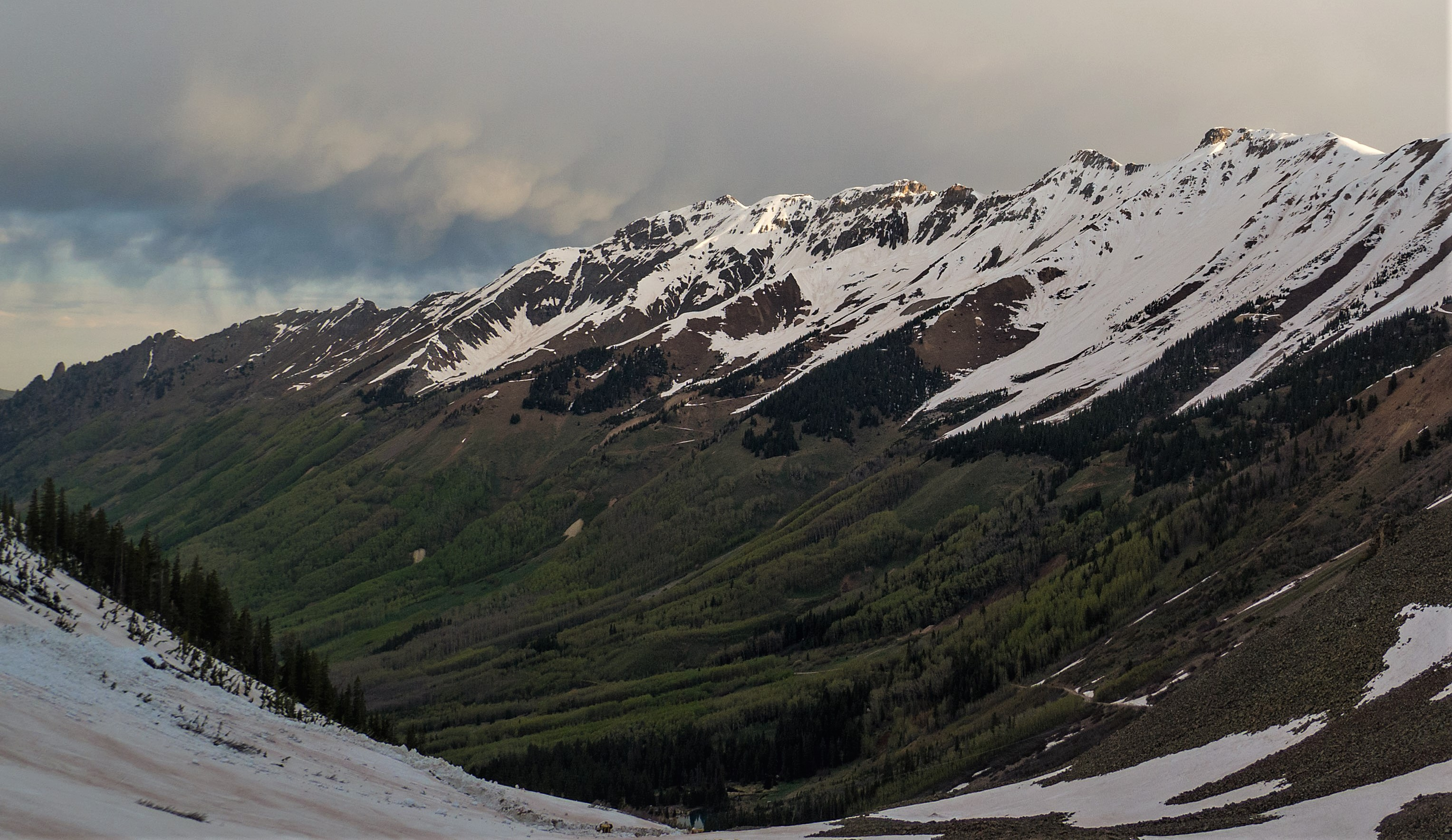
Southeast aspect of Silver Mountain seen from Ophir Pass
