= Ulysses S Grant Peak =

Mountain in the state of Colorado

- U. S. Grant Peak
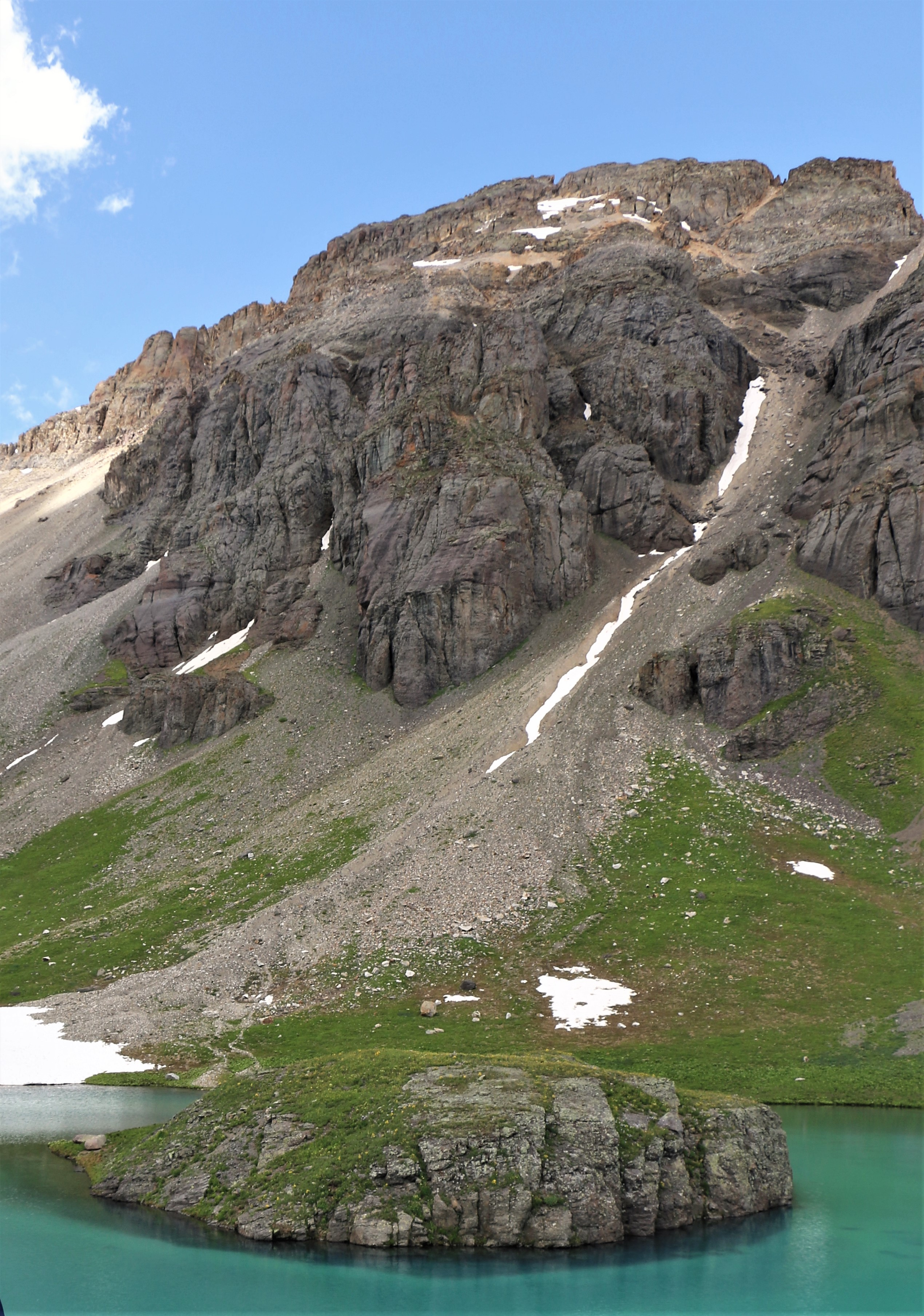
- Southeast aspect, from Island Lake

Highest point
- Elevation: 13,767 ft (4,196 m)
- Prominence: 727 ft (222 m)
- Parent peak: Golden Horn (13,780 ft)
- Isolation: 1.66 mi (2.67 km)
- Coordinates: 37°49′28″N 107°48′26″W

Naming
- Etymology: Ulysses S. Grant

Geography
- Location within Colorado Location within the United States
- Location: San Juan / San Miguel counties Colorado, US
- Parent range: Rocky Mountains; San Juan Mountains
- Topo map: USGS Ophir

Geology
- Rock type: Rhyolite

Climbing
- Easiest route: class 4

Ulysses S Grant Peak is a 13,767-foot-elevation (4,196-meter) mountain summit located on the shared boundary of San Juan County with San Miguel County, in southwest Colorado, United States. It is situated eight miles west of the community of Silverton, on land managed by San Juan National Forest and Uncompahgre National Forest. Ulysses S Grant Peak is part of the San Juan Mountains which are a subset of the Rocky Mountains, and is west of the Continental Divide. It ranks as the 119th-highest peak in Colorado, and topographic relief is significant as the west aspect rises 2,400 feet (730 meters) in approximately one mile. The mountain's name, which has been officially adopted by the United States Board on Geographic Names, was in use in an 1896 scientific publication by Charles Whitman Cross, and listed by Henry Gannett when he published A Gazetteer of Colorado in 1906.

== Climate ==
According to the Köppen climate classification system, Ulysses S Grant Peak is located in an alpine subarctic climate zone with long, cold, snowy winters, and cool to warm summers. Due to its altitude, it receives precipitation all year, as snow in winter, and as thunderstorms in summer, with a dry period in late spring. Precipitation runoff from the mountain drains west into tributaries of the San Miguel River, and east to the Animas River via Mineral Creek.

== See also ==
- Mountains of San Juan County, Colorado
- Mountains of San Miguel County, Colorado

== Gallery ==
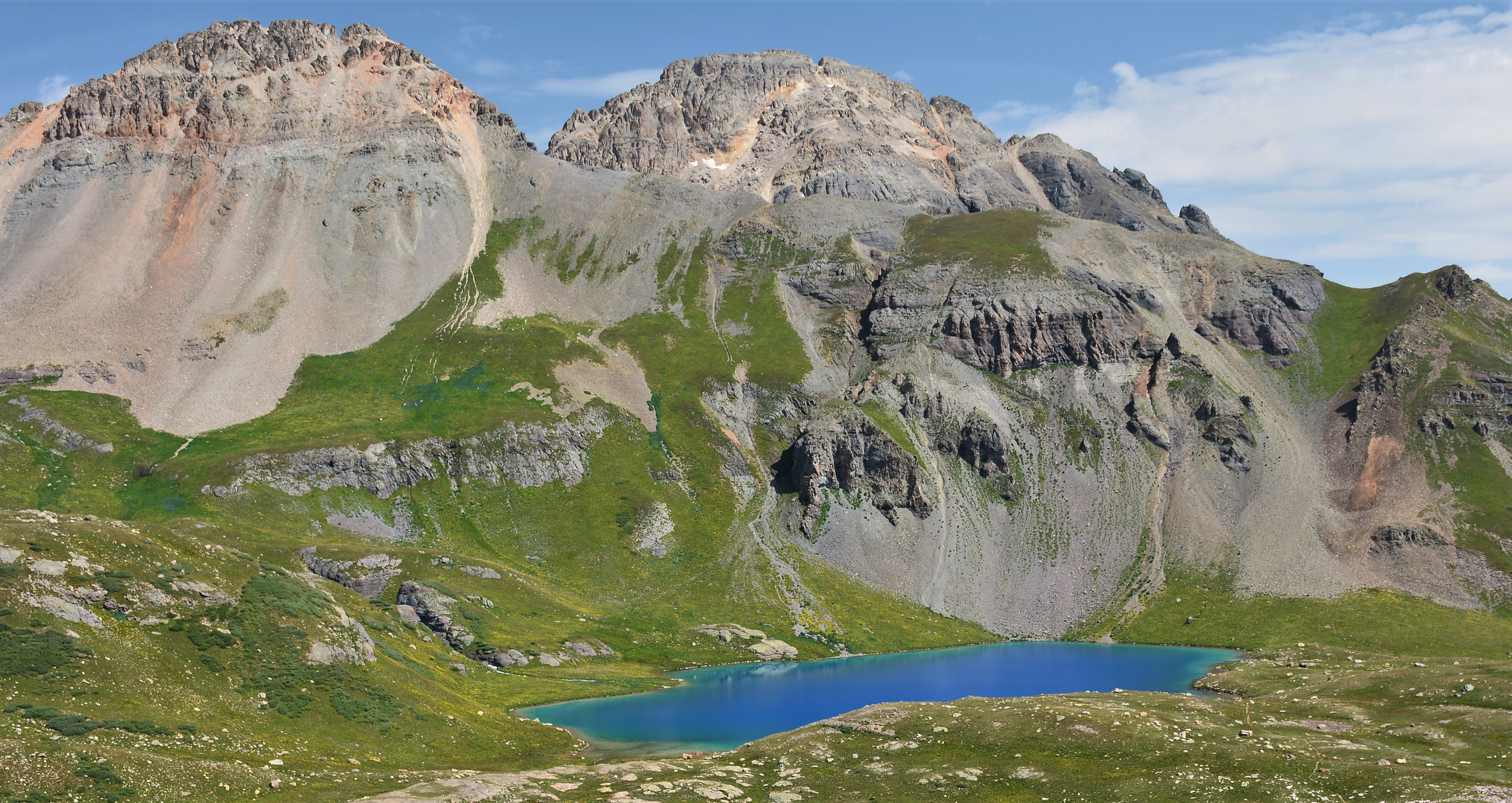
South aspect centered behind ridge and Ice Lake
"V 4" (13,540 ft) to the left

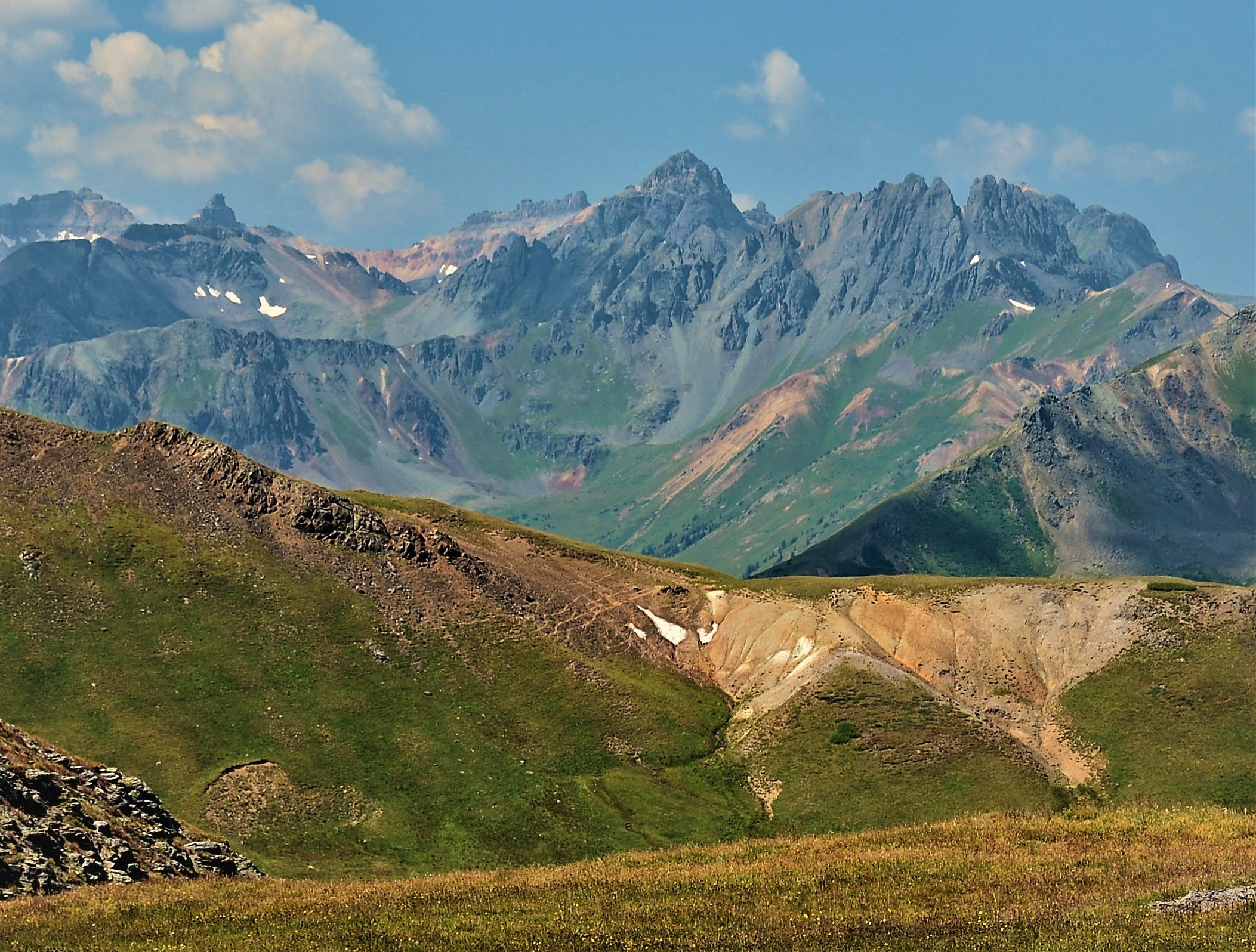
Ulysses S. Grant Peak centered, from the east
