= Wasatch Mountain (Colorado) =

Mountain in Colorado, United States

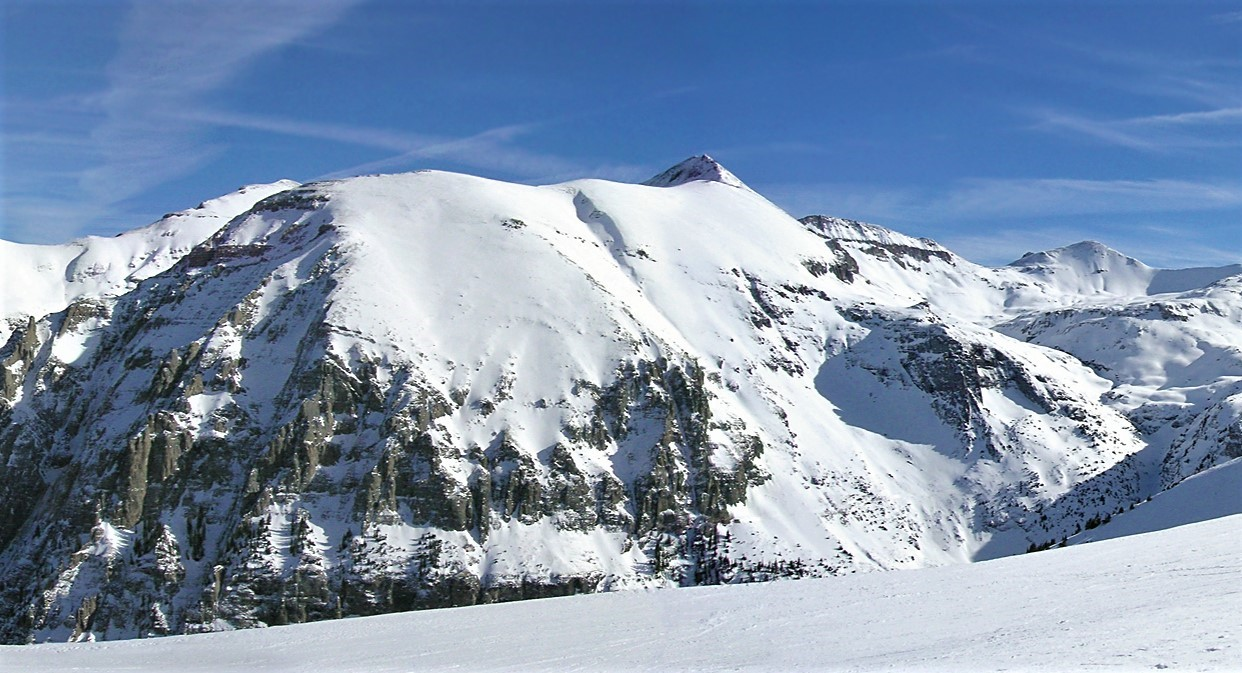
- West aspect, from slopes of Telluride Ski Resort, December 2005

Highest point
- Elevation: 13,555 ft (4,132 m)
- Prominence: 475 ft (145 m)
- Parent peak: Lookout Peak (13,661 ft)
- Isolation: 2.10 mi (3.38 km)
- Coordinates: 37°53′24″N 107°47′45″W

Geography
- Location within Colorado Location within the United States
- Location: San Miguel County, Colorado, United States
- Parent range: Rocky Mountains; San Juan Mountains
- Topo map: USGS Telluride

Climbing
- Easiest route: class 2

Wasatch Mountain is a 13,555-foot (4,132 m) mountain in the San Miguel Mountains in San Miguel County, Colorado, United States.

== Description ==
The mountain is situated 3.5 miles (5.6 km) south-southeast of the town of Telluride, on land managed by Uncompahgre National Forest. It is part of the San Juan Mountains, which are a subset of the Rocky Mountains, and ranks as the 214th-highest peak in Colorado. It is west of the Continental Divide, and 1.5 miles (2.4 km) east of Telluride Ski Resort, from which it is a prominent landmark. Topographic relief is significant as the north aspect rises 4,750 feet (1,450 m) above the San Miguel River valley in three miles. The mountain's name, which has been officially adopted by the United States Board on Geographic Names, was in use in 1906 when Henry Gannett published it in the Gazetteer of Colorado.

== Climate ==
According to the Köppen climate classification system, Wasatch Mountain is located in an alpine subarctic climate zone with long, cold, snowy winters, and cool to warm summers. Due to its altitude, it receives precipitation all year, as snow in winter, and as thunderstorms in summer, with a dry period in late spring. Precipitation runoff from the mountain drains into tributaries of the San Miguel River.

== See also ==
- List of mountains in Colorado
- Mountains of San Miguel County, Colorado

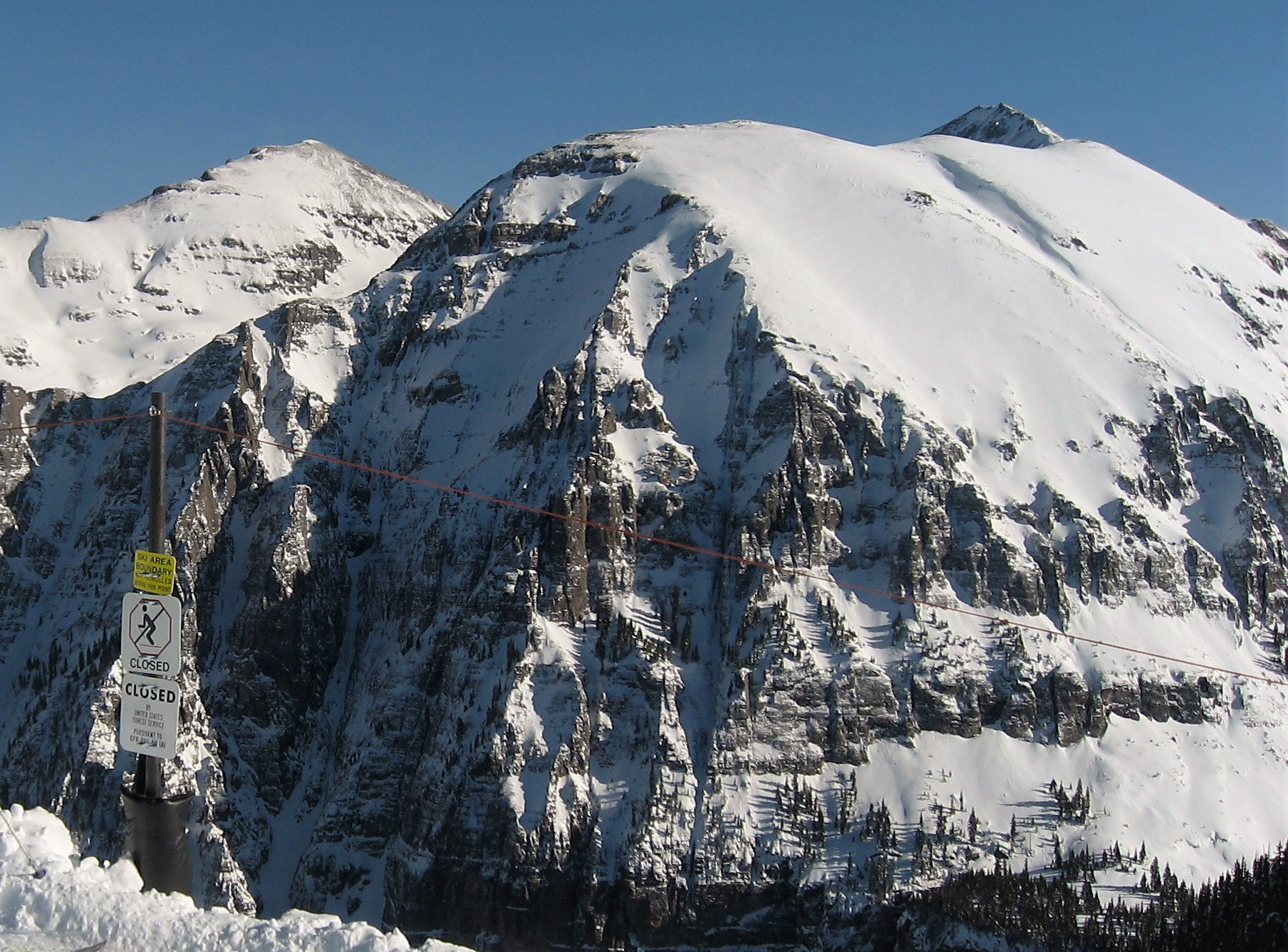
Wasatch Mountain, with La Junta Peak to left, January 2008
