= Trout Lake (Colorado) =

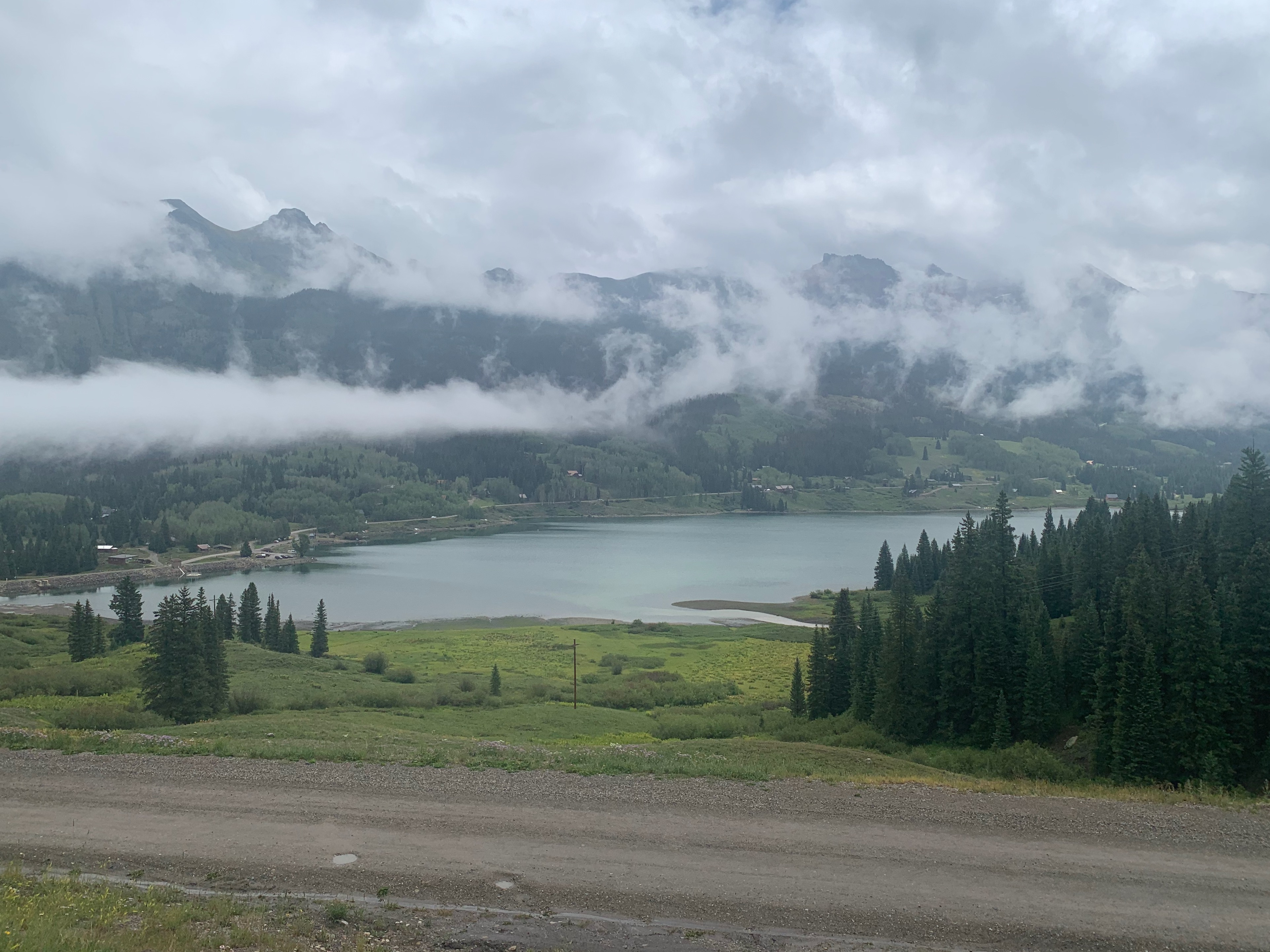
- Looking southeast towards Trout Lake with Yellow Mountain in view

- Location within the state of Colorado Trout Lake (the United States)
- Location: San Miguel County, Colorado, United States
- Coordinates: 37°49′38″N 107°53′00″W
- Type: Reservoir
- Primary inflows: Lake Fork; Lizard Head Creek
- Primary outflows: Lake Fork
- Basin countries: United States
- Surface area: 44.5 ha (110 acres)
- Water volume: 5,000 acre⋅ft (0.0062 km^{3})
- Surface elevation: 9,716 feet (2,961 m)

Trout Lake is a lake located in southeast San Miguel County, Colorado, in Uncompahgre National Forest. Trout Lake is a 15-minute drive from Ophir via Colorado State Highway 145 and a 20-minute drive from Telluride.

== History ==
Trout Lake was originally explored by American fur-trappers and pioneers, who often used the lake as a stopping point for their expeditions. The population of Trout Lake grew after the construction of the Rio Grande Southern Railroad and the nearby Ames Hydroelectric Generating Plant in the 1890s.

=== Early history ===
While it is unknown if Spanish, Mexican, or Native American explorers reached Trout Lake previously, the first record of Trout Lake was taken by an American fur trapping expedition. In the spring of 1831, the St. Louis Fur Company employed a party of 60 men under the command of Colonel William G Walton to trap beavers and other fur-bearing animals along the headwaters of the San Juan River. The party spent the summer of 1833 in the valley of the Rio Dolores and at Trout Lake before continuing their journey northward.

On June 14, 1882, the first post office in Trout Lake was established. At the time it was described as "a post office, with a small lake near it" and "a miner's camp of about a score in number". Between 1875 and 1885, the area around Trout Lake was often visited by prospectors, but after 10 years of searching, no mines were found near Trout Lake and the post office closed. In the 1885 Colorado Census, Trout Lake was recorded as having a population of 40.

The post office was reopened between 1890 and 1892 with the construction of the Rio Grande Southern Railroad in 1891.

On June 13, 1905, Trout Lake became a part of the newly created Montezuma Forest Reserve with the signing of Proclamation 575 by Theodore Roosevelt. The Montezuma Forest Reserve became a National Forest on March 4, 1907. On July 1, 1947, Montezuma National Forest as split between San Juan National Forest and Uncompahgre National Forest, with Trout Lake becoming part of Uncompahgre National Forest.

The 1910 Census recorded Trout Lake as having a population of 62.

=== Trout Lake Dam ===
Trout Lake is a natural lake but was expanded in the 1894 with the construction of the Trout Lake Dam by Telluride Power Co. The purpose of the dam was to create additional reserves for the Ames Hydroelectric Generating Plant 3.25 miles downstream. Trout Lake still supplies the Ames Hydroelectric Plant via a concrete-encased outlet pipe that transports water from the Trout Lake Dam's Penstock to the Ames Hydroelectric Plant.

=== 1909 Flood ===
On September 5, 1909, heavy rains and flooding caused the failure of the Trout Lake and Middle Dams. A defect in the Middle Dam's outlet, which permitted water to wash away the soil under the dam, likely contributed to the flood. The collapse of the dams released approximately 2,000 Acre-feet of water downstream, killing livestock, destroying miles of railroad track, and flooding the nearby towns of Placerville, Sawpit, and Newmire. The Ames Hydroelectric plant remained mostly unharmed. While no one died in the flood, the damage to property was estimated to be $200,000 (approximately $7,200,000 today).

The scene along the [San Miguel] river Monday morning as the waters had partially receded forbids intelligent description. Wagon, railroad bridges, and trestles were crushed like clay pipes and entirely obliterated. The accumulated mass of water behind was described by eye witnesses as a solid wall 20 to 30 feet in height.

— Telluride Daily Journal, September 6, 1909

In 1910, the dam was rebuilt with soil and rock instead of the timber used in the previous dam.

In 1954, the dam's spillway was rebuilt to prevent flooding in Trout Lake. The spillway included two steel siphons that discharge water 200 feet downstream from the dam into Lake Fork.

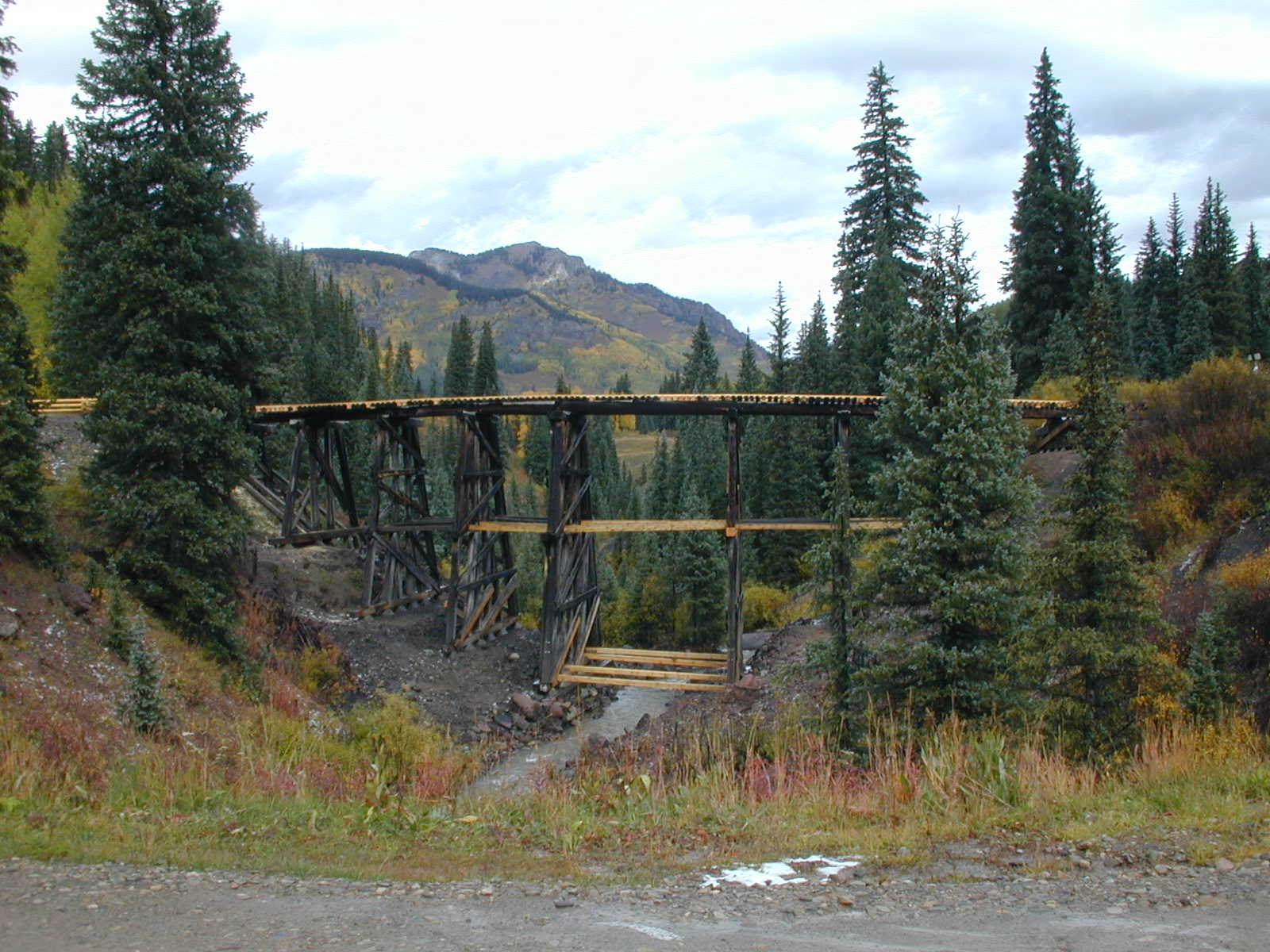
View of the trestle after stabilization work was completed in 2004

=== Rio Grande Southern Railroad ===
Starting in 1891, Trout Lake was used as a watering station for the Rio Grande Southern Railroad (RGS), which used the water from the lake to fill its steam engines. There were 15 similar stations used by the RGS, all of which were serviced by a large force of men called "water service" who maintained the water tanks. While the railroad is no longer in operation, the 50,000 gallon wood watering tank (one of only two left) and a nearby railroad trestle remain.

After the railroad was abandoned in 1952 the trestle continued to be used as an automobile bridge for several years until a detour was built around it. The trestle was added to the Colorado State Register of Historic Properties on May 14, 1997. The trestle was stabilized in 2004 with grant funds from the Colorado Historical Fund, Intermodel Surface Transportation Efficiency Act, San Miguel County, and US Forest Service.

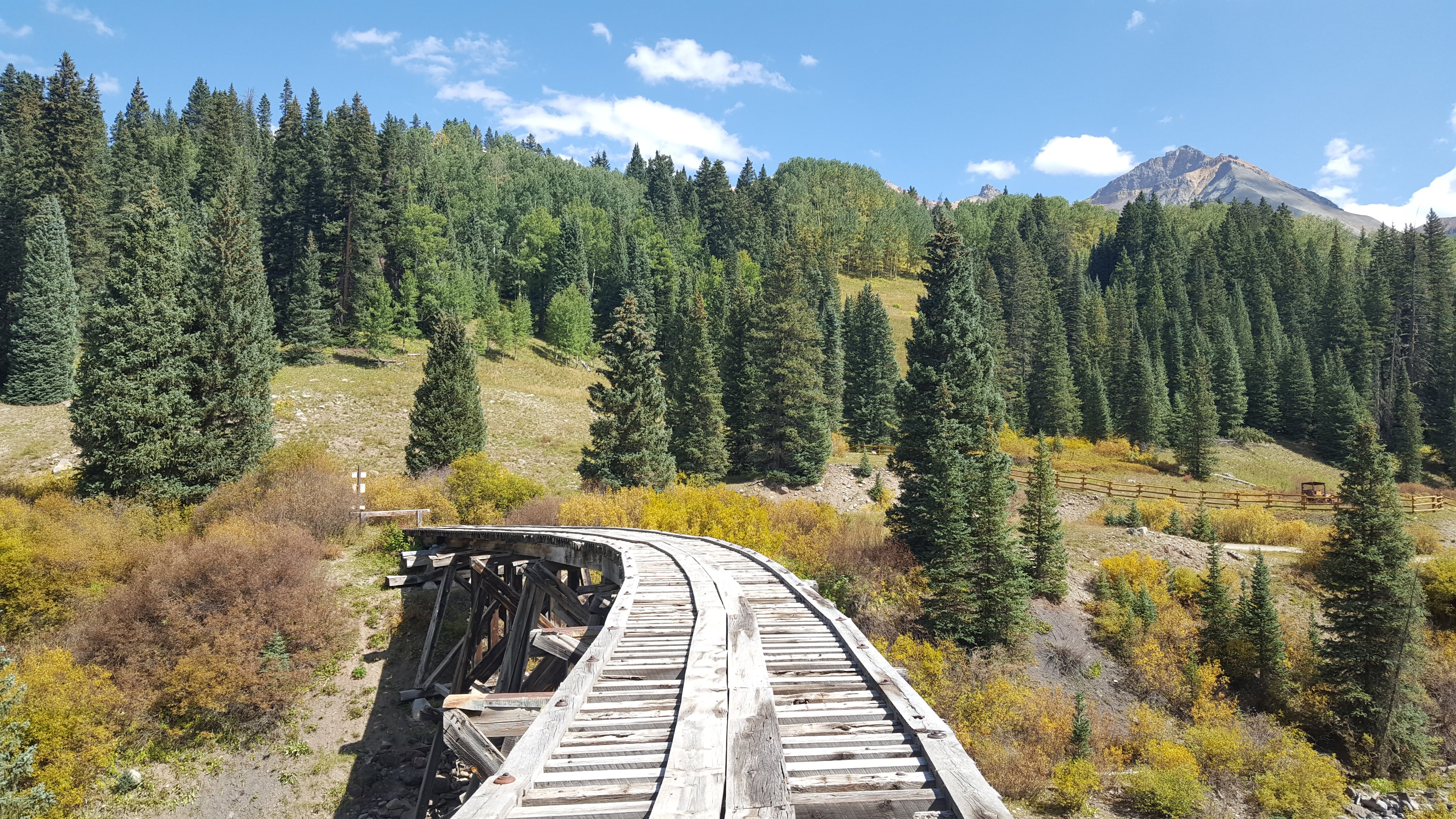
Overlooking the former RGS trestle in September of 2021

== Recreation ==
Trout Lake had become a popular tourist attraction as early as 1920, especially for fishing. Today, the area around the lake features multiple hiking trails, which in the winter are groomed by the Telluride Nordic Association to be used for cross-country skiing. The lake is also used for boating and fishing.

== Gallery ==
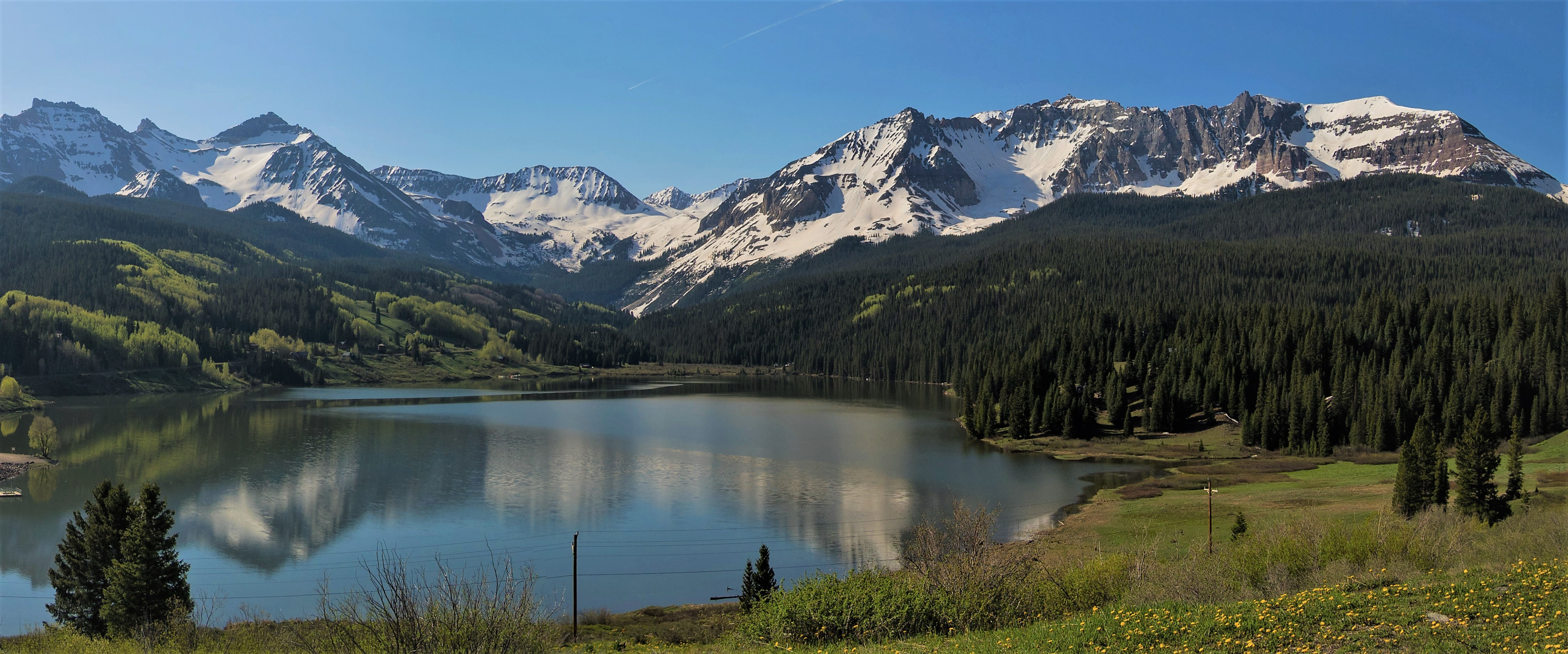
Trout Lake and Sheep Mountain

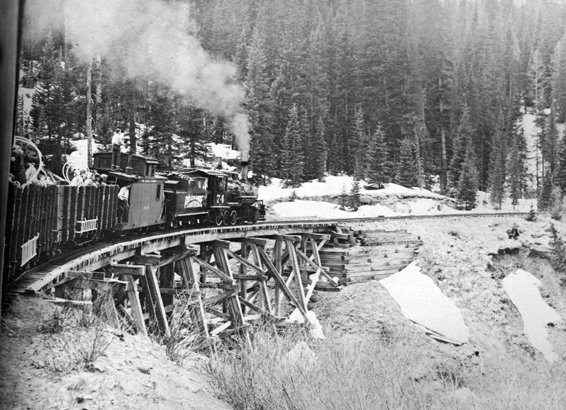
Historic photo of a Rio Grande Southern train passing over the Trout Lake Trestle during winter (date unknown)

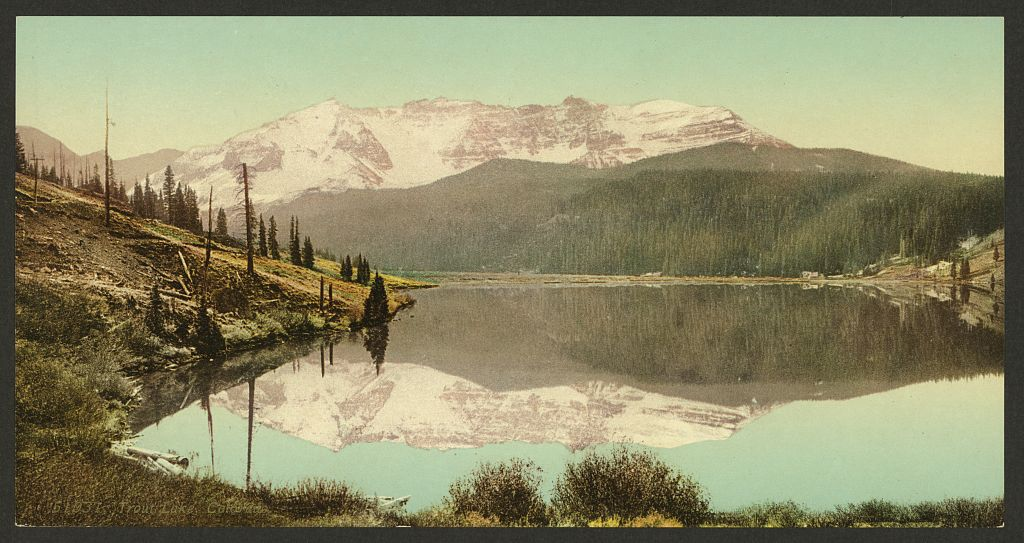
A historical photo of Trout Lake taken between 1898 and 1905

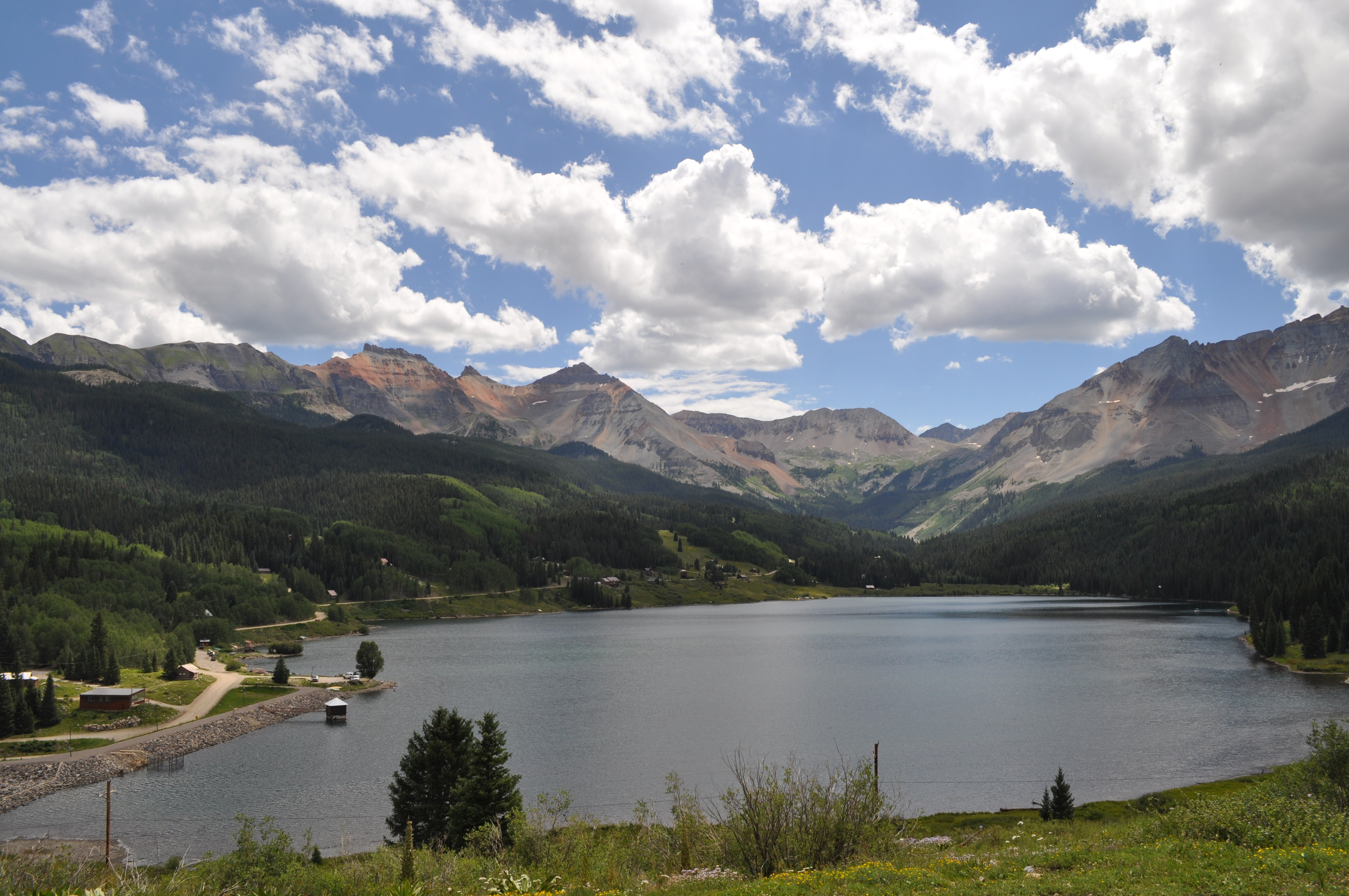
Looking east towards trout lake in August 2011

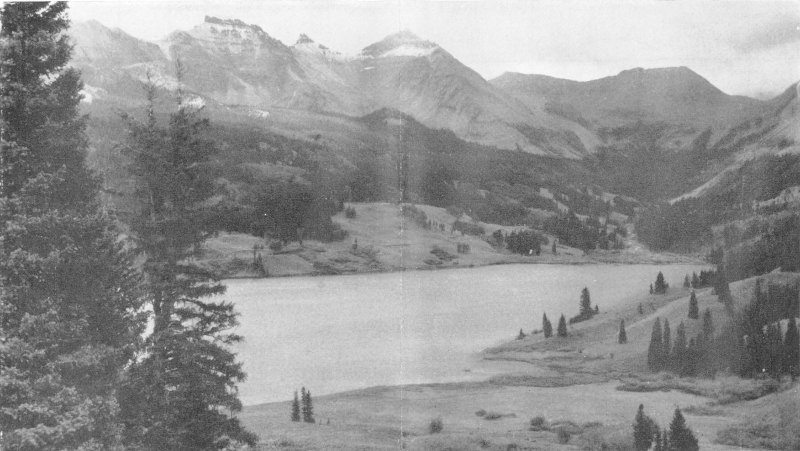
A photo of Trout Lake with the San Juan Mountains in the background, taken in 1939 or earlier

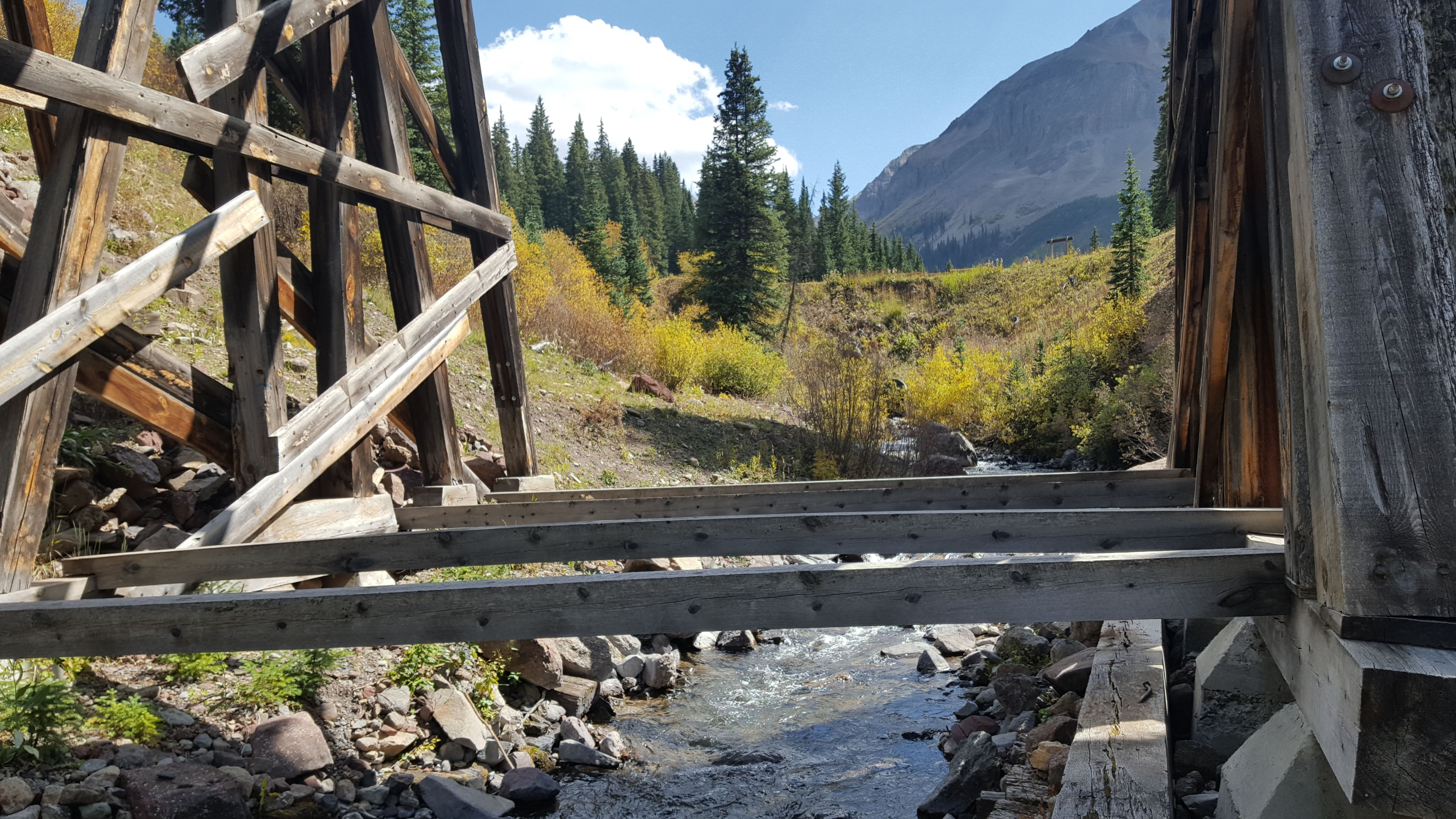
At the bottom of the Southern's trestle in September 2021

== See also ==
- List of lakes of Colorado
- List of lands protected by Theodore Roosevelt through executive action

== Notes ==
- ^aDespite the name, Lake Fork is a river, not a lake.
