= Golden Horn (Colorado) =

Mountain summit in southwest Colorado

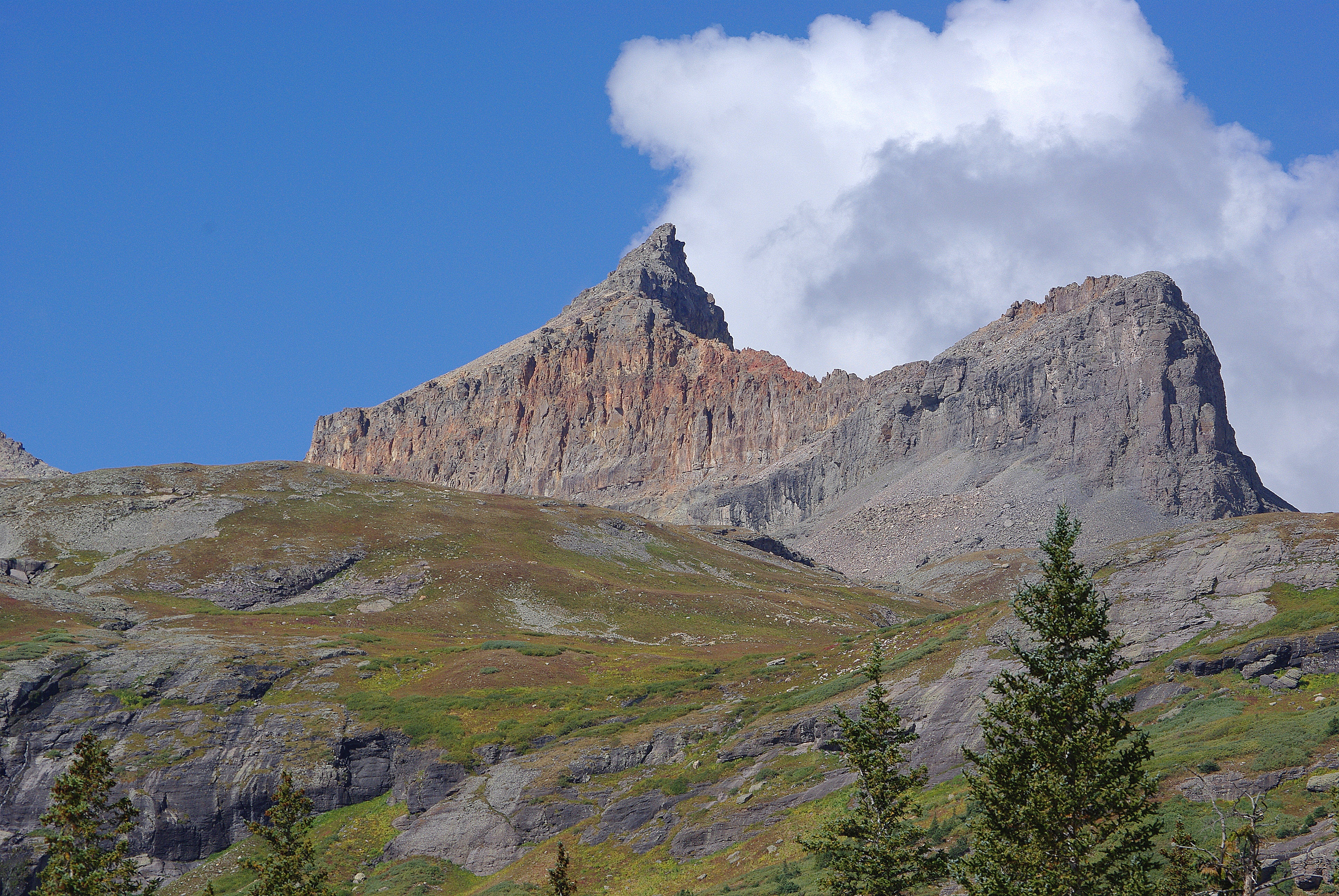
- East aspect

Highest point
- Elevation: 13,780 ft (4,200 m)
- Prominence: 360 ft (110 m)
- Parent peak: Vermilion Peak (13,894 ft)
- Isolation: 0.42 mi (0.68 km)
- Coordinates: 37°48′17″N 107°49′29″W

Naming
- Etymology: Golden Horn

Geography
- Location within Colorado Location within the United States
- Location: San Juan / San Miguel counties Colorado, US
- Parent range: Rocky Mountains; San Juan Mountains
- Topo map: USGS Ophir

Climbing
- Easiest route: class 2+ Southwest Ridge

Golden Horn is a 13,780-foot-elevation (4,200-meter) mountain summit located on the shared boundary of San Juan County with San Miguel County, in southwest Colorado, United States. It is situated nine miles west of the community of Silverton, on land managed by San Juan National Forest and Uncompahgre National Forest. Golden Horn is part of the San Juan Mountains which are a subset of the Rocky Mountains, and is west of the Continental Divide. It ranks as the 116th-highest peak in Colorado, and topographic relief is significant as the west aspect rises 3,800 feet (1,200 meters) in approximately 1.5 mile. The mountain's name, which has been officially adopted by the United States Board on Geographic Names, was in use in 1906 when Henry Gannett published it in A Gazetteer of Colorado.

== Climate ==
According to the Köppen climate classification system, Golden Horn is located in an alpine subarctic climate zone with long, cold, snowy winters, and cool to warm summers. Due to its altitude, it receives precipitation all year, as snow in winter, and as thunderstorms in summer, with a dry period in late spring. Precipitation runoff from the mountain drains west into tributaries of the Dolores River, and east to the Animas River via Mineral Creek.

== See also ==
- Mountains of San Juan County, Colorado
- Mountains of San Miguel County, Colorado

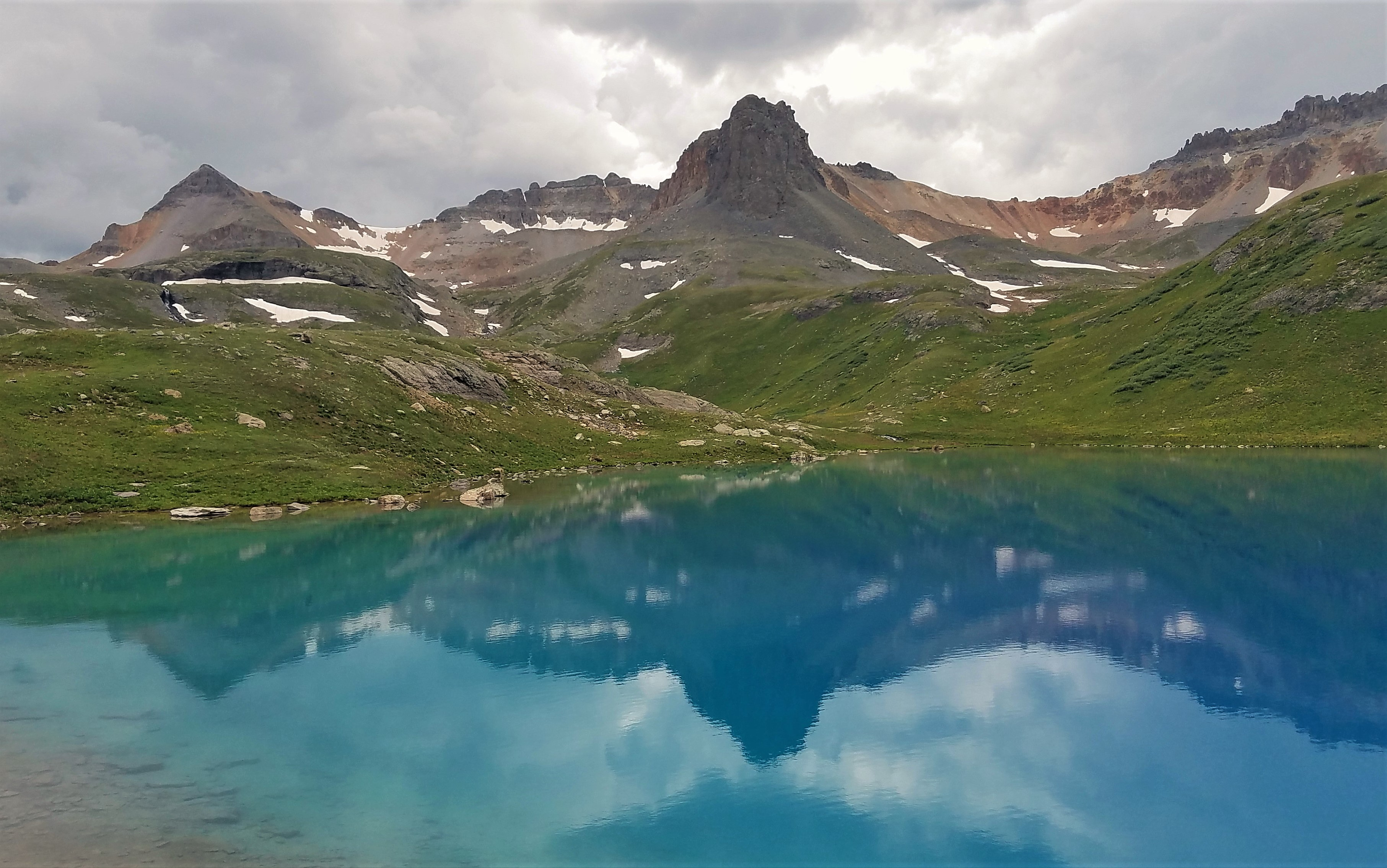
Ice Lake. Left to rightː Fuller Peak, Vermilion Peak, northeast spur of Golden Horn (centered), and part of Pilot Knob to right
