= Coxcomb Peak (Colorado) =

Mountain in Colorado, United States

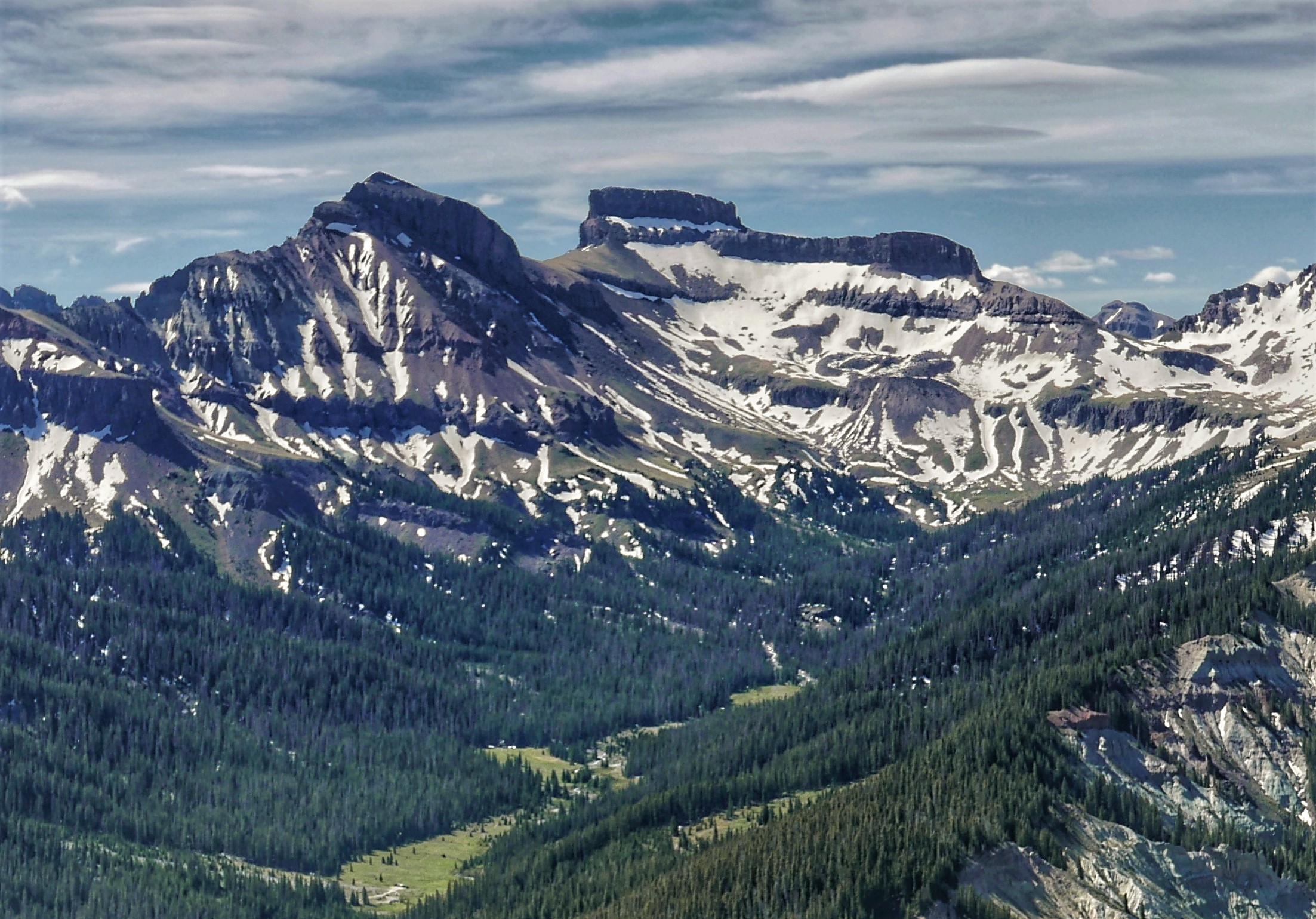
- North aspect centered (Redcliff to the left)

Highest point
- Elevation: 13,656 ft (4,162 m)
- Prominence: 776 ft (237 m)
- Parent peak: Wetterhorn Peak (14,021 ft)
- Isolation: 1.82 mi (2.93 km)
- Coordinates: 38°04′48″N 107°32′02″W

Naming
- Etymology: Cockscomb

Geography
- Location within Colorado Location within the United States
- Location: Hinsdale County / Ouray County; Colorado, US
- Parent range: Rocky Mountains; San Juan Mountains
- Topo map: USGS Wetterhorn Peak

Climbing
- First ascent: 1929, Henry Buchtel
- Easiest route: class 5.3 climbing SW Chimney

Coxcomb Peak is a 13,656-foot-elevation (4,162-meter) mountain summit located on the common boundary of Hinsdale County and Ouray County, in Colorado, United States. It is situated nine miles northeast of the community of Ouray, in the Uncompahgre Wilderness, on land managed by Uncompahgre National Forest. It is part of the San Juan Mountains which are a subset of the Rocky Mountains, and is situated west of the Continental Divide. Coxcomb ranks as the 171st-highest peak in Colorado, and topographic relief is significant as the south aspect rises 2,000 feet (610 meters) above Wetterhorn Basin in approximately one mile, and 4,400 feet (1,300 meters) above Cow Creek in three miles. Neighbors include Precipice Peak 2.7 miles to the north, Redcliff one-half mile north, Matterhorn Peak 2.3 miles to the east-southeast, and nearest higher neighbor Wetterhorn Peak 1.8 mile to the southeast. The mountain's descriptive name, which has been officially adopted by the United States Board on Geographic Names, was in use since at least 1906 when Henry Gannett published it in the Gazetteer of Colorado.

== Climbing ==
The first ascent of the summit was made August 16, 1929, by Henry Buchtel and party via the Southwest Chimney. There is also an established climbing route on the North Face that was first climbed in August 1965 by Dick Yeatts, Mike Stults, Dick Guadagno, and Martin Etter. The best approach is via the valley of West Fork Cimarron River.

== Climate ==
According to the Köppen climate classification system, Coxcomb Peak is located in an alpine subarctic climate zone with cold, snowy winters, and cool to warm summers. Due to its altitude, it receives precipitation all year, as snow in winter, and as thunderstorms in summer, with a dry period in late spring. Precipitation runoff from the mountain's north aspect drains into tributaries of the Cimarron River, and from the south slope into tributaries of the Uncompahgre River.

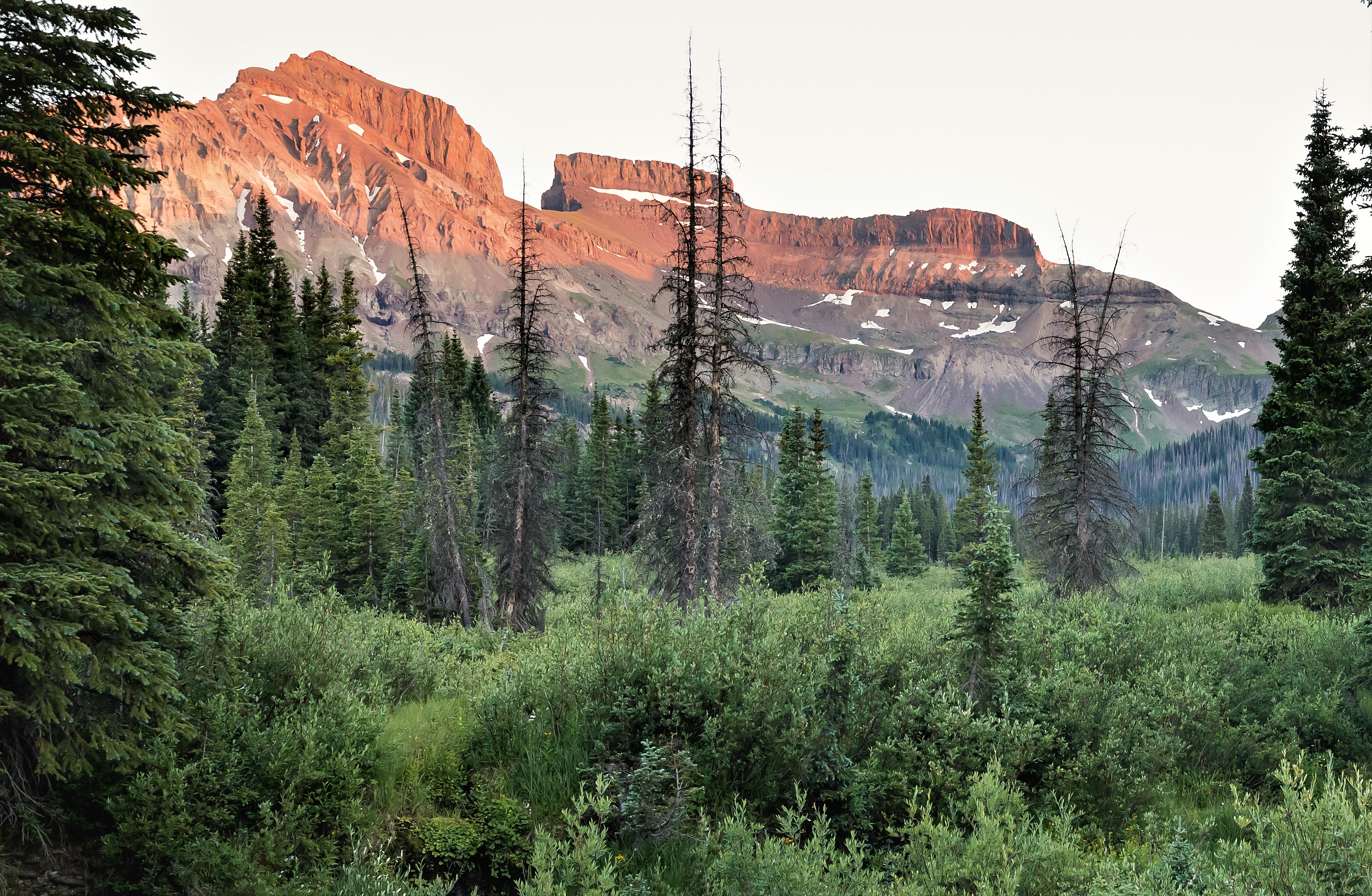
Redcliff (left) and Coxcomb Peak (centered)

== See also ==
- Mountains of Hinsdale County, Colorado
- Mountains of Ouray County, Colorado
