= Chimney Rock (Colorado) =

Mountain pillar in Colorado, United States

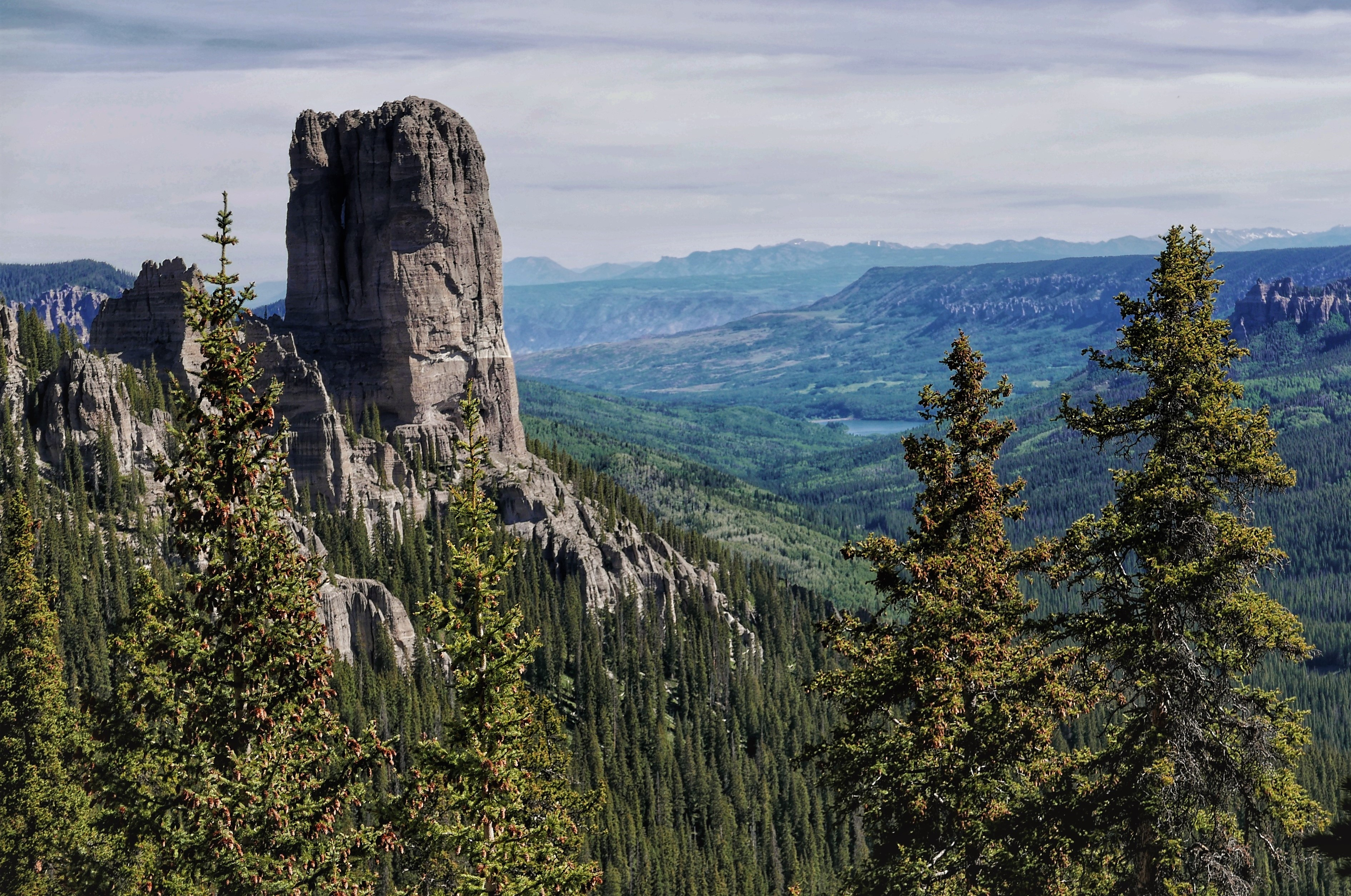
- South aspect

Highest point
- Elevation: 11,781 ft (3,591 m)
- Prominence: 381 ft (116 m)
- Parent peak: Courthouse Mountain (12,152 ft)
- Isolation: 0.82 mi (1.32 km)
- Coordinates: 38°08′48″N 107°34′14″W

Naming
- Etymology: Chimney

Geography
- Location within Colorado Location within the United States
- Location: Hinsdale County / Ouray County; Colorado, US
- Parent range: Rocky Mountains; San Juan Mountains
- Topo map: USGS Courthouse Mountain

Geology
- Rock type: Tuff

Climbing
- First ascent: 1934
- Easiest route: class 5.6 climbing South face

Chimney Rock is an 11,781-foot-elevation (3,591-meter) pillar located on the shared boundary of Hinsdale County with Ouray County, in southwest Colorado, United States. It is situated 10.5 miles east of the community of Ridgway, and immediately south of Owl Creek Pass, in the Uncompahgre Wilderness, on land managed by Uncompahgre National Forest. Owl Creek Pass separates Chimney Rock from Cimarron Ridge to the north. It is part of the San Juan Mountains which are a subset of the Rocky Mountains, and is situated west of the Continental Divide. Chimney Rock is the steepest point in Colorado with an average steepness of 61.4 degrees. Topographic relief is significant as the east aspect rises 1,600 feet (490 meters) above West Fork Cimarron River in one-half mile. Chimney Rock can be seen from Highway 550 near Ridgway. This feature's name was officially adopted by the United States Board on Geographic Names in 1966, prior to that it was known as Chimney Peak. The first ascent was made in 1934 by Melvin Griffiths and Robert Ormes via the 400-foot south face, which is the only established climbing route.

== Climate ==
According to the Köppen climate classification system, Chimney Rock is located in an alpine subarctic climate zone with cold, snowy winters, and cool to warm summers. Due to its altitude, it receives precipitation all year, as snow in winter, and as thunderstorms in summer, with a dry period in late spring. Precipitation runoff from the east side of the mountain drains into tributaries of the Cimarron River, and from the west side into Uncompahgre River via Cow Creek.

== Films ==
Chimney Rock appeared in Rooster Cogburn's climactic shootout of the 1969 western motion picture, True Grit, starring John Wayne. It is also seen in the 1962 epic, How the West Was Won, as Gregory Peck tries to tow a covered wagon stuck in the mud.

== Gallery ==
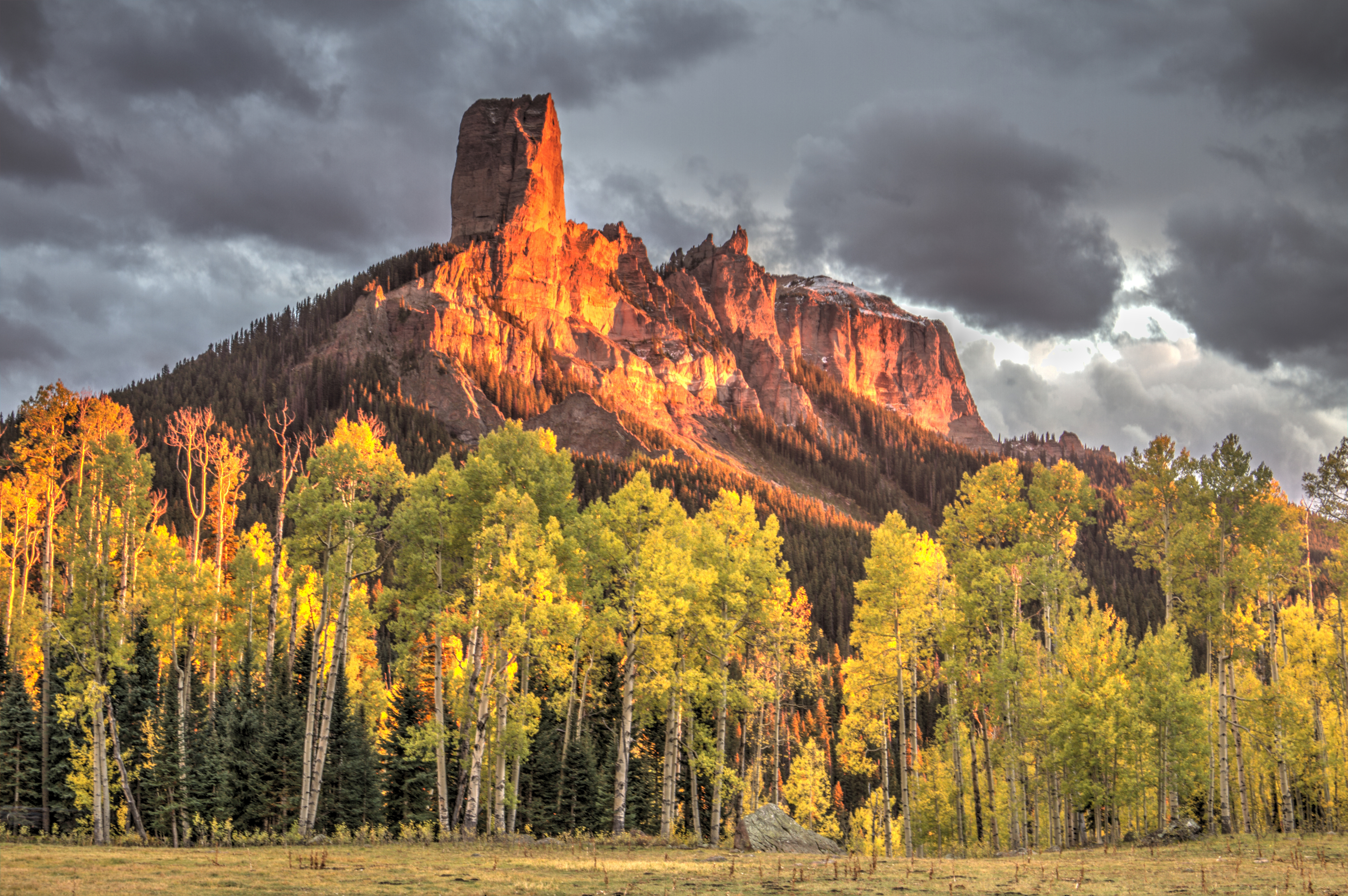
Chimney Rock from the north, with Courthouse Mountain behind

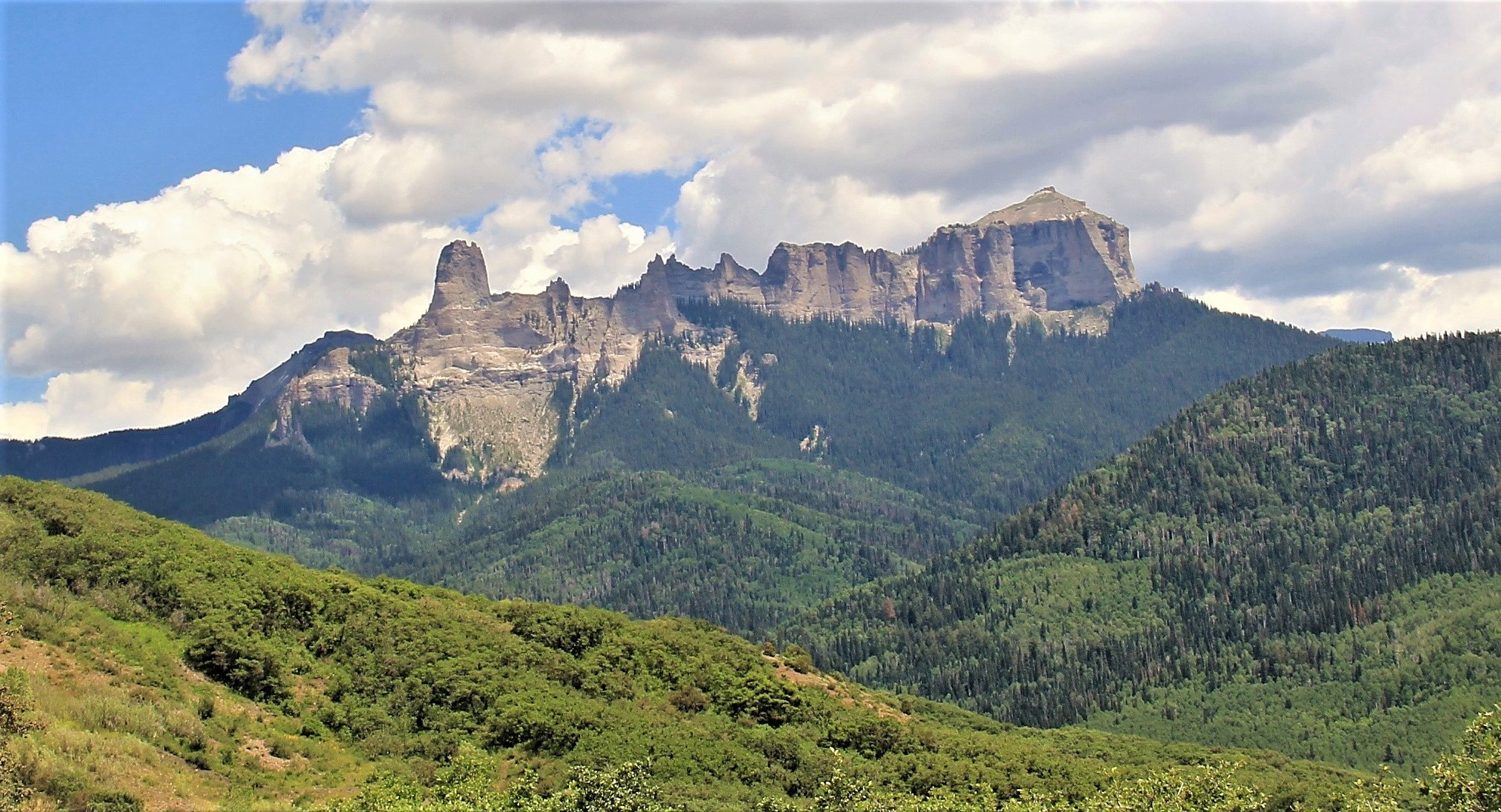
Chimney Rock (left), Courthouse Mountain (right). West aspect.

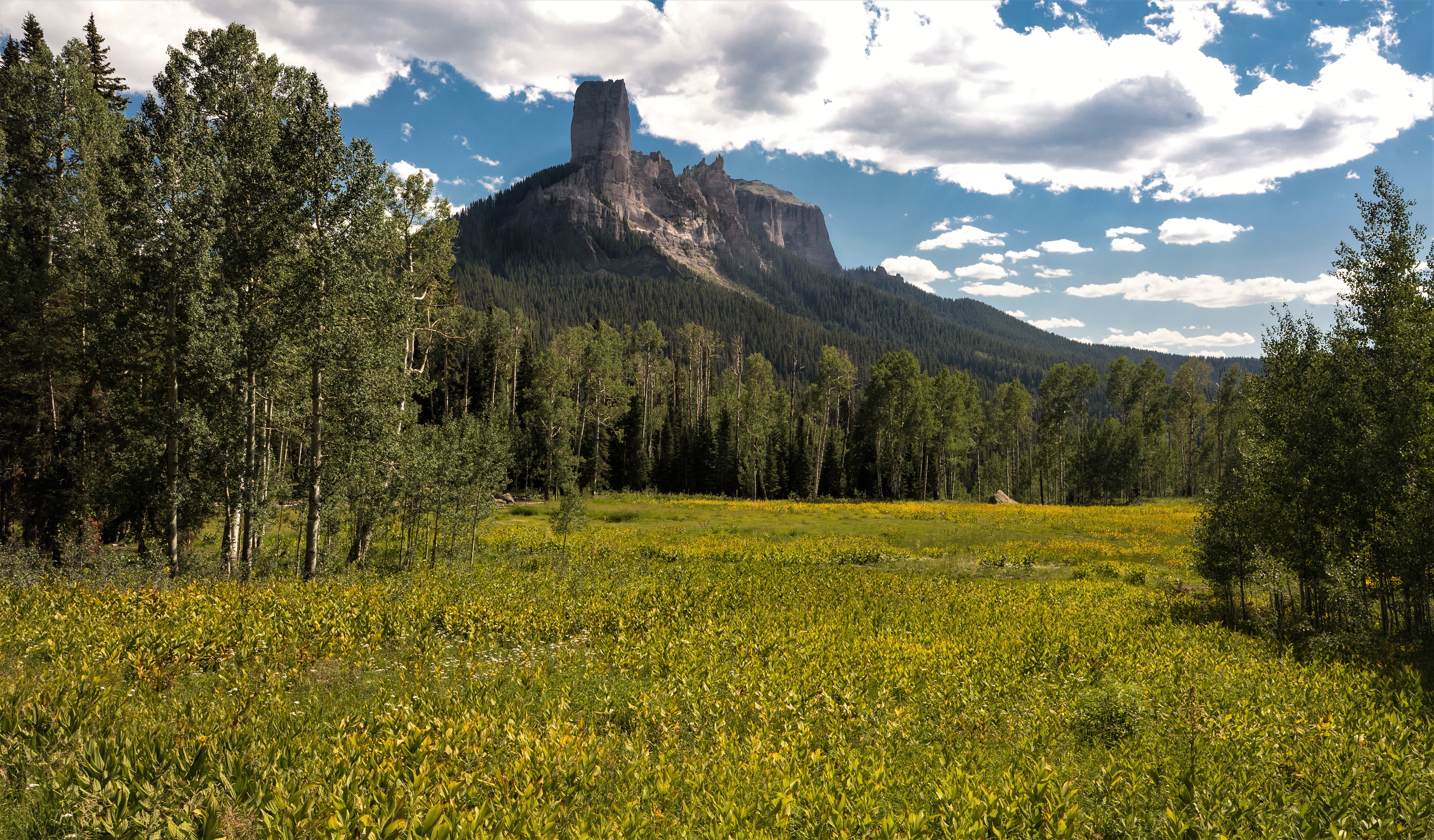

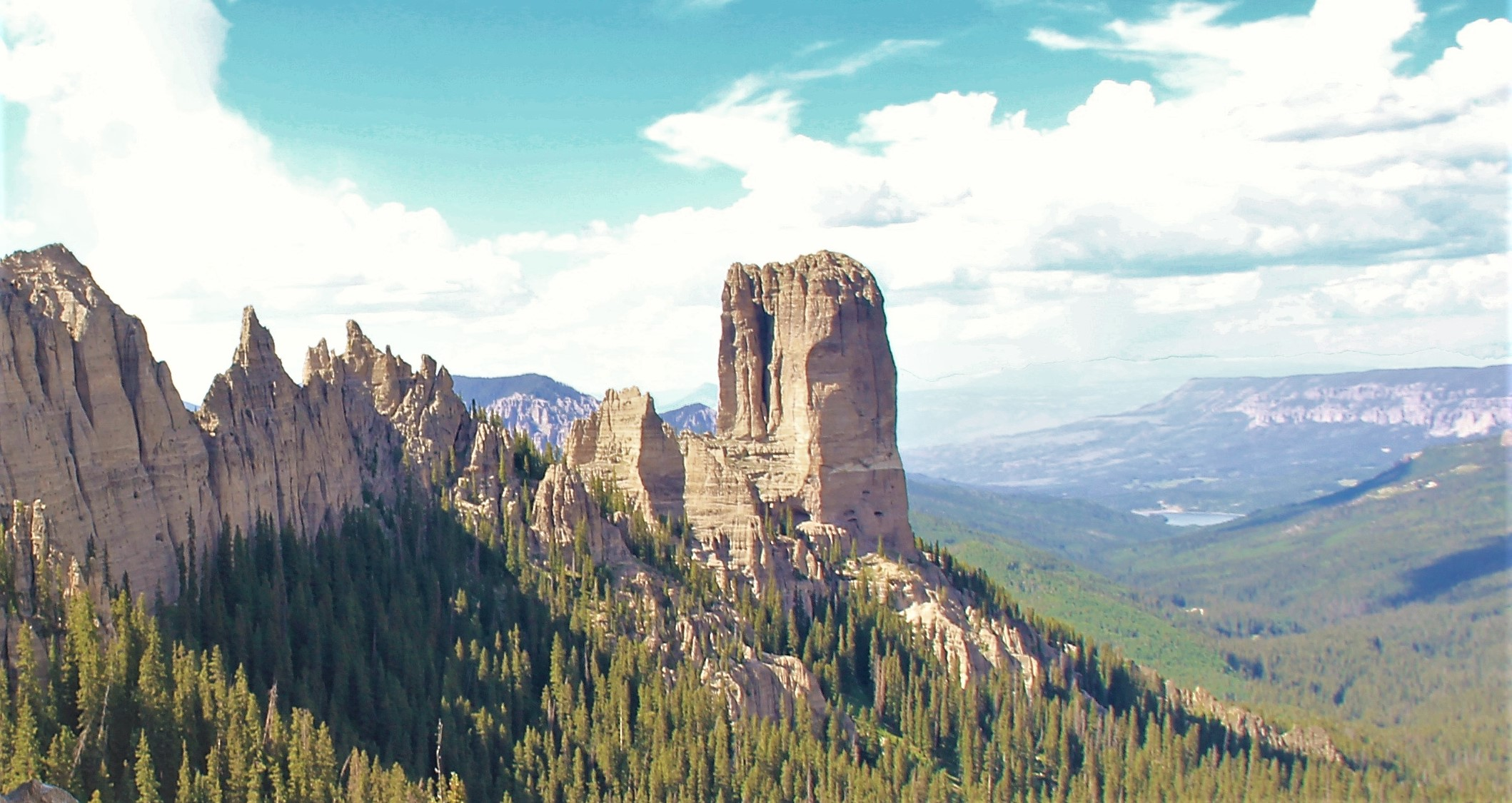
Chimney Rock seen from Courthouse Trail

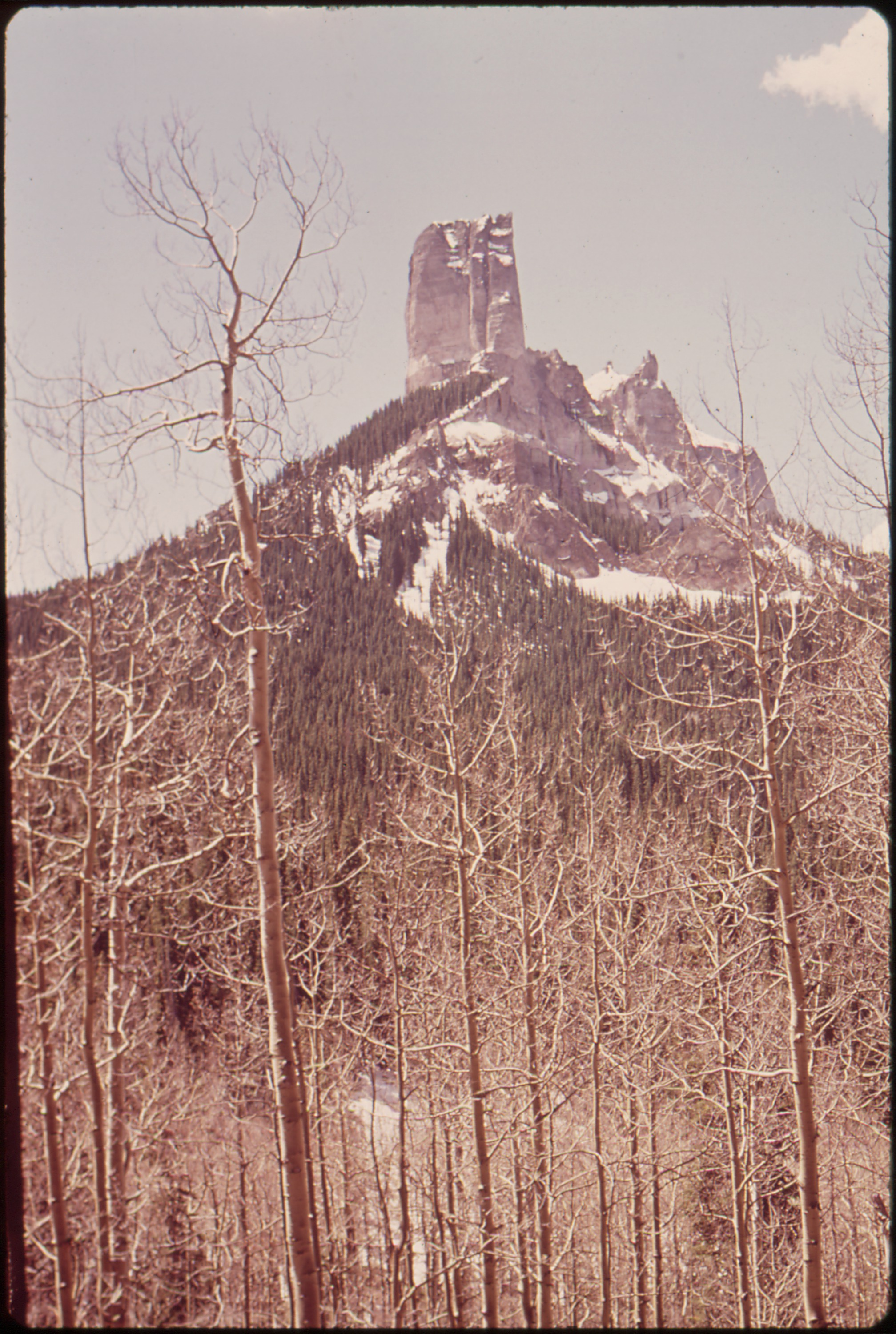

== See also ==
- Precipice Peak
- Dunsinane Mountain
- Geology of Colorado
