= Redcliff (Colorado) =

Mountain in the state of Colorado

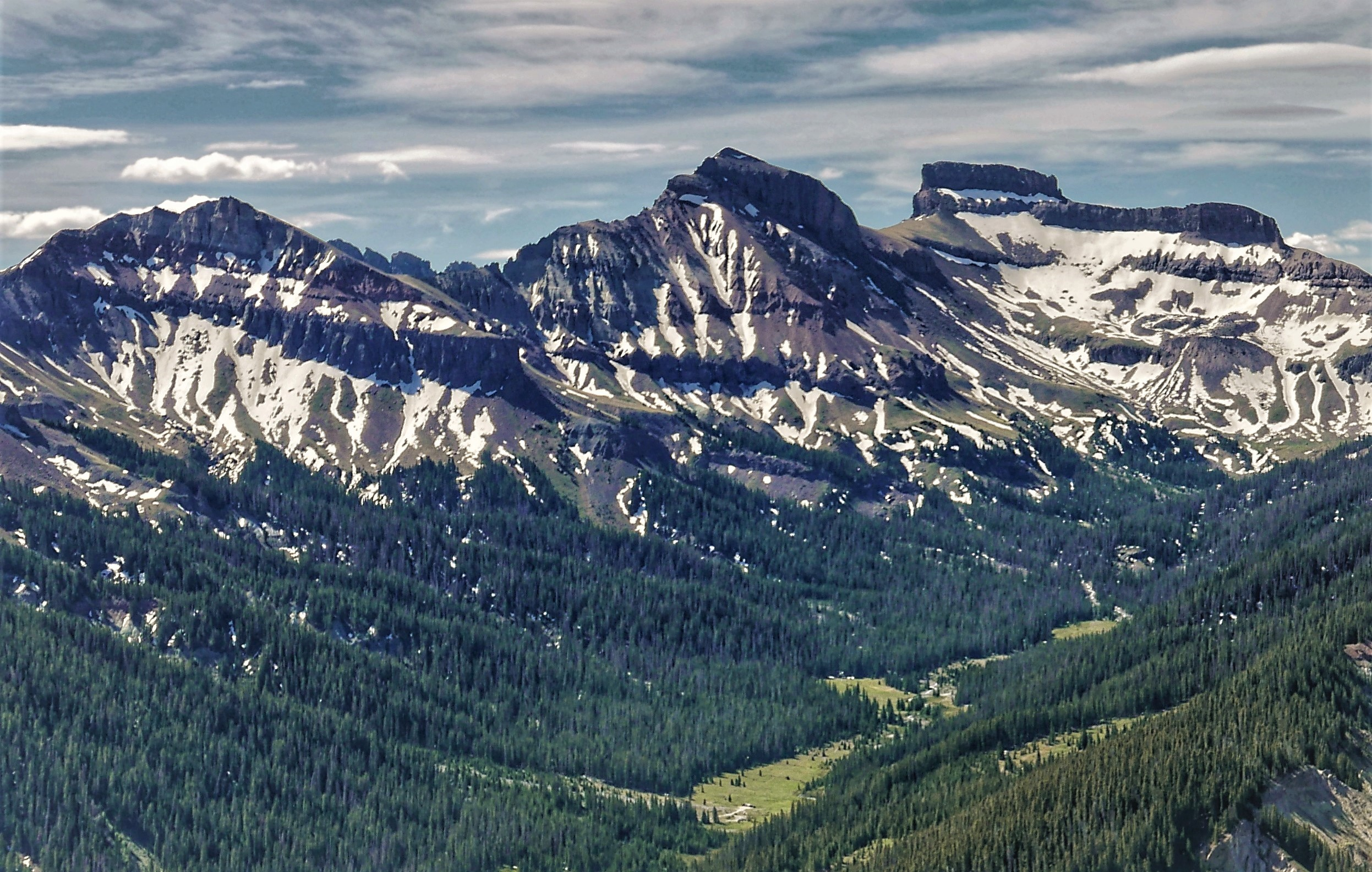
- Redcliff centered, view from Courthouse Mountain {Fortress Peak left, Coxcomb Peak right}

Highest point
- Elevation: 13,642 ft (4,158 m)
- Prominence: 482 ft (147 m)
- Parent peak: Coxcomb Peak (13,656 ft)
- Isolation: 0.49 mi (0.79 km)
- Coordinates: 38°05′14″N 107°31′59″W

Geography
- Location within Colorado Location within the United States
- Location: Hinsdale County; Colorado, US
- Parent range: Rocky Mountains; San Juan Mountains
- Topo map: USGS Wetterhorn Peak

Geology
- Rock type: tuff

Climbing
- Easiest route: class 2 South ridge

Redcliff is a 13,642-foot-elevation (4,158-meter) mountain summit located in Hinsdale County, in southwest Colorado, United States. It is situated nine miles northeast of the town of Ouray, in the Uncompahgre Wilderness, on land managed by Uncompahgre National Forest. It is part of the San Juan Mountains which are a subset of the Rocky Mountains, and is situated west of the Continental Divide. Redcliff ranks as the 175th-highest peak in Colorado, and topographic relief is significant as the west aspect rises 2,300 feet (700 meters) above the West Fork Cimarron River valley in approximately one mile. Neighbors include Precipice Peak and Dunsinane Mountain along the west-middle Cimarron divide three miles to the north, and nearest higher neighbor Coxcomb Peak one-half mile to the south. An ascent of Redcliff involves 3,300 feet of elevation gain and 10 miles of hiking, round-trip. The mountain's name was proposed by the Colorado Mountain Club, and was officially adopted in 1966 by the United States Board on Geographic Names. It is so named because of a large reddish-colored cliff on the mountain's east face.

== Climate ==
According to the Köppen climate classification system, Redcliff is located in an alpine subarctic climate zone with cold, snowy winters, and cool to warm summers. Due to its altitude, it receives precipitation all year, as snow in winter, and as thunderstorms in summer, with a dry period in late spring. Precipitation runoff from the mountain drains into headwaters of both the west and middle forks of the Cimarron River.

== See also ==
- Mountains of Hinsdale County, Colorado
