= Courthouse Mountain =

Mountain in the state of Colorado, US

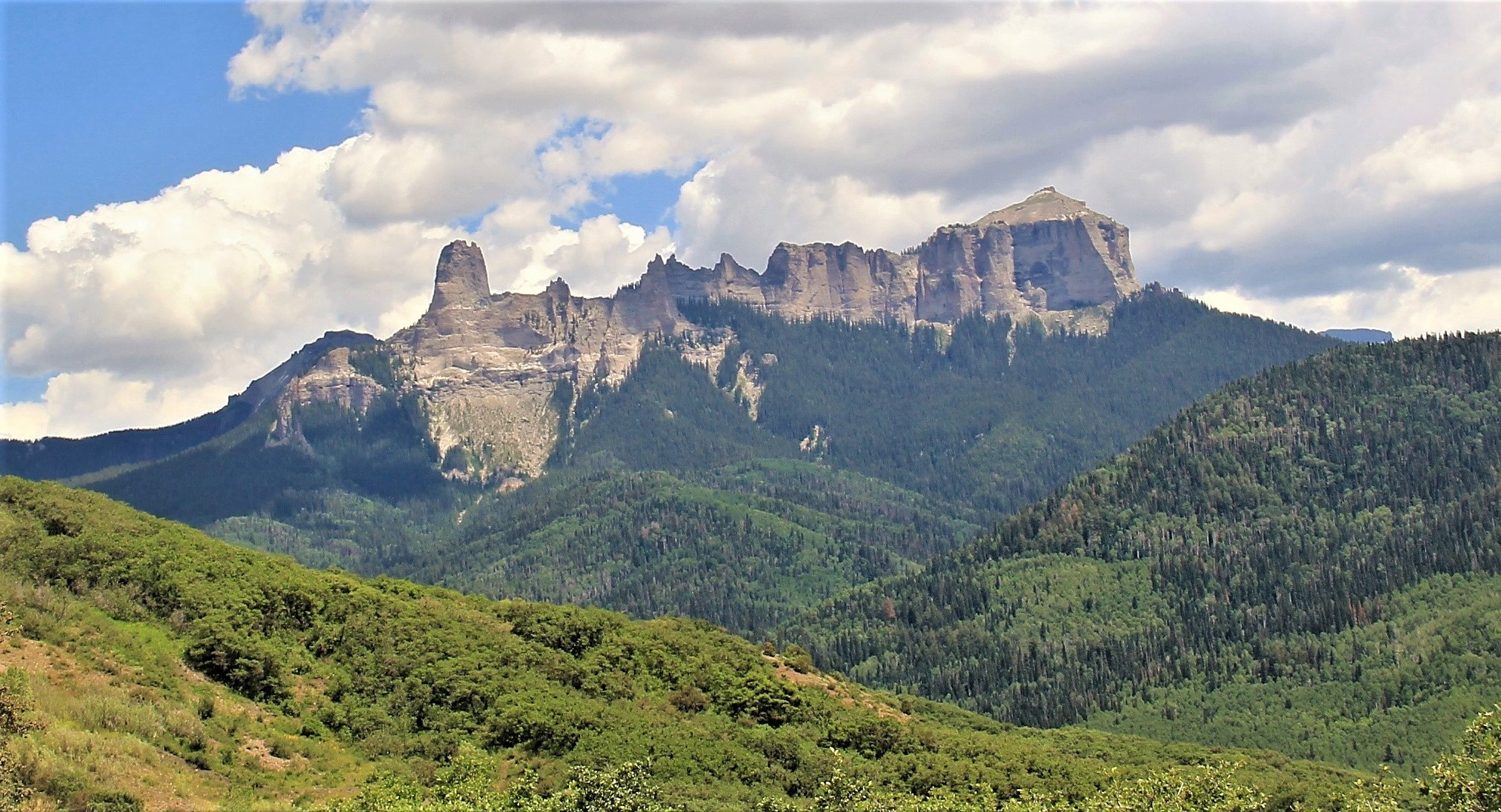
- West aspect, with Chimney Rock to left

Highest point
- Elevation: 12,152 ft (3,704 m)
- Prominence: 1,152 ft (351 m)
- Parent peak: Dunsinane Mountain (12,742 ft)
- Isolation: 1.93 mi (3.11 km)
- Coordinates: 38°08′07″N 107°34′26″W

Geography
- Location within Colorado Location within the United States
- Location: Ouray County / Hinsdale County; Colorado, US
- Parent range: Rocky Mountains; San Juan Mountains
- Topo map: USGS Courthouse Mountain

Geology
- Rock age: Tertiary
- Rock type: Tuff

Climbing
- Easiest route: class 2+

Courthouse Mountain is a 12,152-foot-elevation (3,704-meter) mountain summit located on the shared boundary of Hinsdale County with Ouray County, in southwest Colorado, United States. It is situated 10.5 miles east of the community of Ridgway, and south of Owl Creek Pass, in the Uncompahgre Wilderness, on land managed by Uncompahgre National Forest. It is part of the San Juan Mountains which are a subset of the Rocky Mountains, and is situated west of the Continental Divide. Topographic relief is significant as the east aspect rises nearly 2,000 feet (610 meters) above West Fork Cimarron River in approximately one-half mile, and with its prominence can be seen from Highway 550 near Ridgway. The mountain's name, which has been officially adopted by the United States Board on Geographic Names, was in use before 1906 when Henry Gannett published it in the Gazetteer of Colorado.

== Climate ==
According to the Köppen climate classification system, Courthouse Mountain is located in an alpine subarctic climate zone with cold, snowy winters, and cool to warm summers. Due to its altitude, it receives precipitation all year, as snow in winter, and as thunderstorms in summer, with a dry period in late spring. Precipitation runoff from the east side of the mountain drains into tributaries of the Cimarron River, and from the west side into the Uncompahgre River via Cow Creek.

== See also ==
- Chimney Rock
- Precipice Peak
- Geology of Colorado
