= Uncompahgre =

Uncompahgre can refer to several different geographic features, mainly within Colorado:

== Places ==
- Uncompahgre Peak
- Uncompahgre Plateau
- Uncompahgre National Forest
- Uncompahgre River
- Uncompahgre Gorge
- Uncompahgre Wilderness

== Other ==
- Uncompahgre Ute people
