= Matterhorn Peak (Colorado) =

Mountain in the American state of Colorado

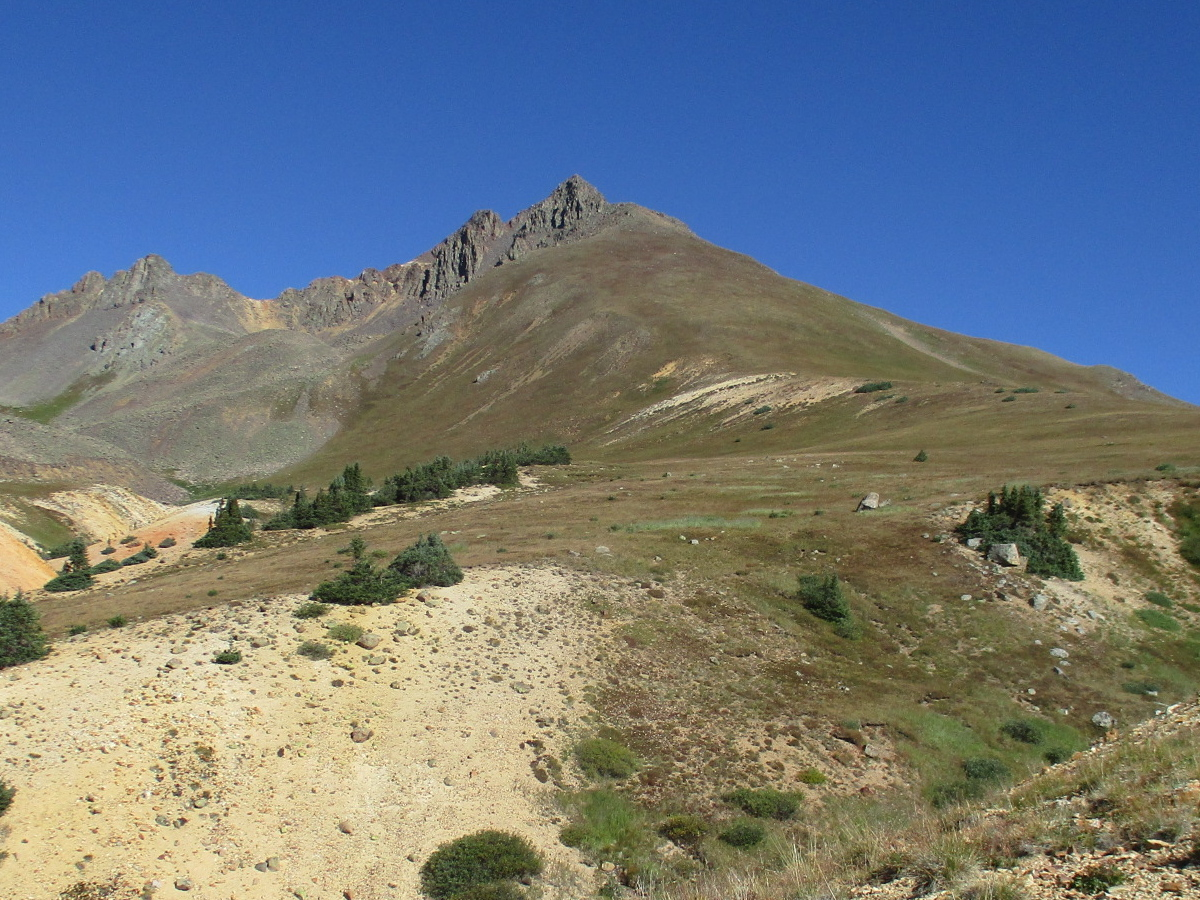
- Matterhorn Peak viewed from the south.

Highest point
- Elevation: 13,596 ft (4,144 m)
- Prominence: 570 ft (174 m)
- Parent peak: Wetterhorn Peak
- Isolation: 0.86 mi (1.38 km)
- Coordinates: 38°03′54″N 107°29′45″W

Geography
- Location within Colorado
- Location: Hinsdale County, Colorado, U.S.
- Parent range: San Juan Mountains
- Topo map(s): USGS 7.5' topographic map Matterhorn Peak, Colorado

Matterhorn Peak is a high mountain summit in the San Juan Mountains range of the Rocky Mountains of North America. The 13,596-foot (4,144 m) thirteener is located in the Uncompahgre Wilderness of Uncompahgre National Forest, 10.3 miles (16.6 km) west by north (bearing 283°) of the Town of Lake City in Hinsdale County, Colorado, United States.

== Mountain ==
Matterhorn Peak and neighboring Wetterhorn Peak are named after the Matterhorn and the Wetterhorn, two famous peaks in the Swiss Alps. Both Colorado peaks are pointed rock spires (hence slightly resembling their namesake peaks), whose shapes contrast with the broad bulk of the higher Uncompahgre Peak.

== See also ==
- List of Colorado mountain ranges
- List of Colorado mountain summits
  - List of Colorado fourteeners
  - List of Colorado 4000 meter prominent summits
  - List of the most prominent summits of Colorado
- List of Colorado county high points
