= Dunsinane Mountain =

Mountain in Colorado, United States

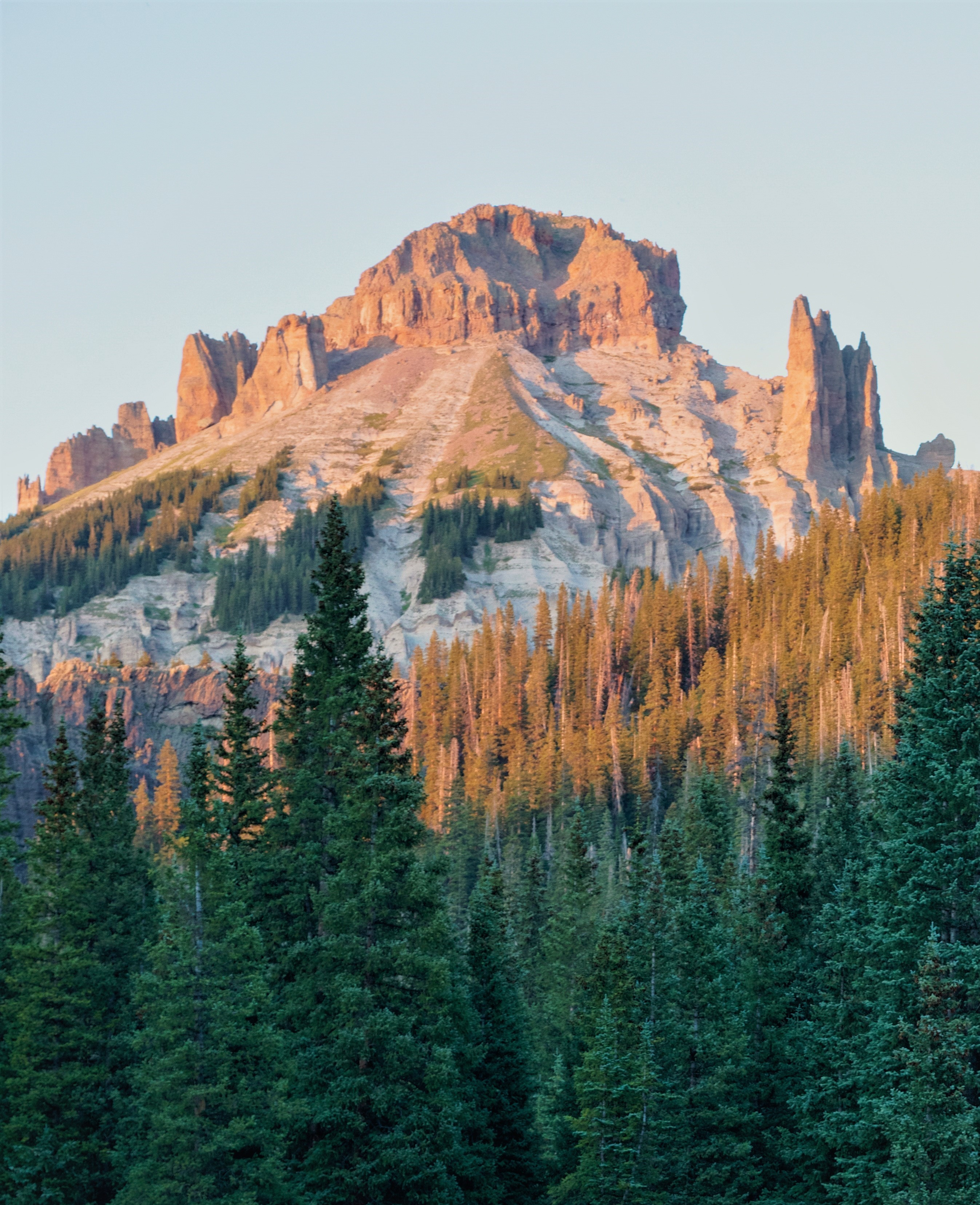
- Southwest aspect

Highest point
- Elevation: 12,742 ft (3,884 m)
- Prominence: 582 ft (177 m)
- Parent peak: Precipice Peak (13,144 ft)
- Isolation: 0.74 mi (1.19 km)
- Coordinates: 38°07′47″N 107°32′21″W

Naming
- Etymology: castle Dunsinane

Geography
- Location within Colorado Location within the United States
- Location: Hinsdale County; Colorado, US
- Parent range: Rocky Mountains; San Juan Mountains
- Topo map: USGS Courthouse Mountain

Climbing
- Easiest route: class 4 North ridge

Dunsinane Mountain, or officially Dunsinane, is a 12,742-foot-elevation (3,884-meter) mountain summit located in Hinsdale County, of Colorado, United States. It is situated 11 miles east of the community of Ridgway, in the Uncompahgre Wilderness, on land managed by Uncompahgre National Forest. It is part of the San Juan Mountains which are a subset of the Rocky Mountains, and is situated west of the Continental Divide. Topographic relief is significant as the east aspect rises 2,500 feet (760 meters) above the Middle Fork Cimarron River valley in approximately one mile. The mountain's name was officially adopted as Dunsinane by the United States Board on Geographic Names in 1966, and is so named because it resembles the castle Dunsinane of Shakespeare's Macbeth.

== Climate ==
According to the Köppen climate classification system, Dunsinane is located in an alpine subarctic climate zone with cold, snowy winters, and cool to warm summers. Due to its altitude, it receives precipitation all year, as snow in winter, and as thunderstorms in summer, with a dry period in late spring. Precipitation runoff from the mountain drains into tributaries of the Cimarron River.

== Gallery ==
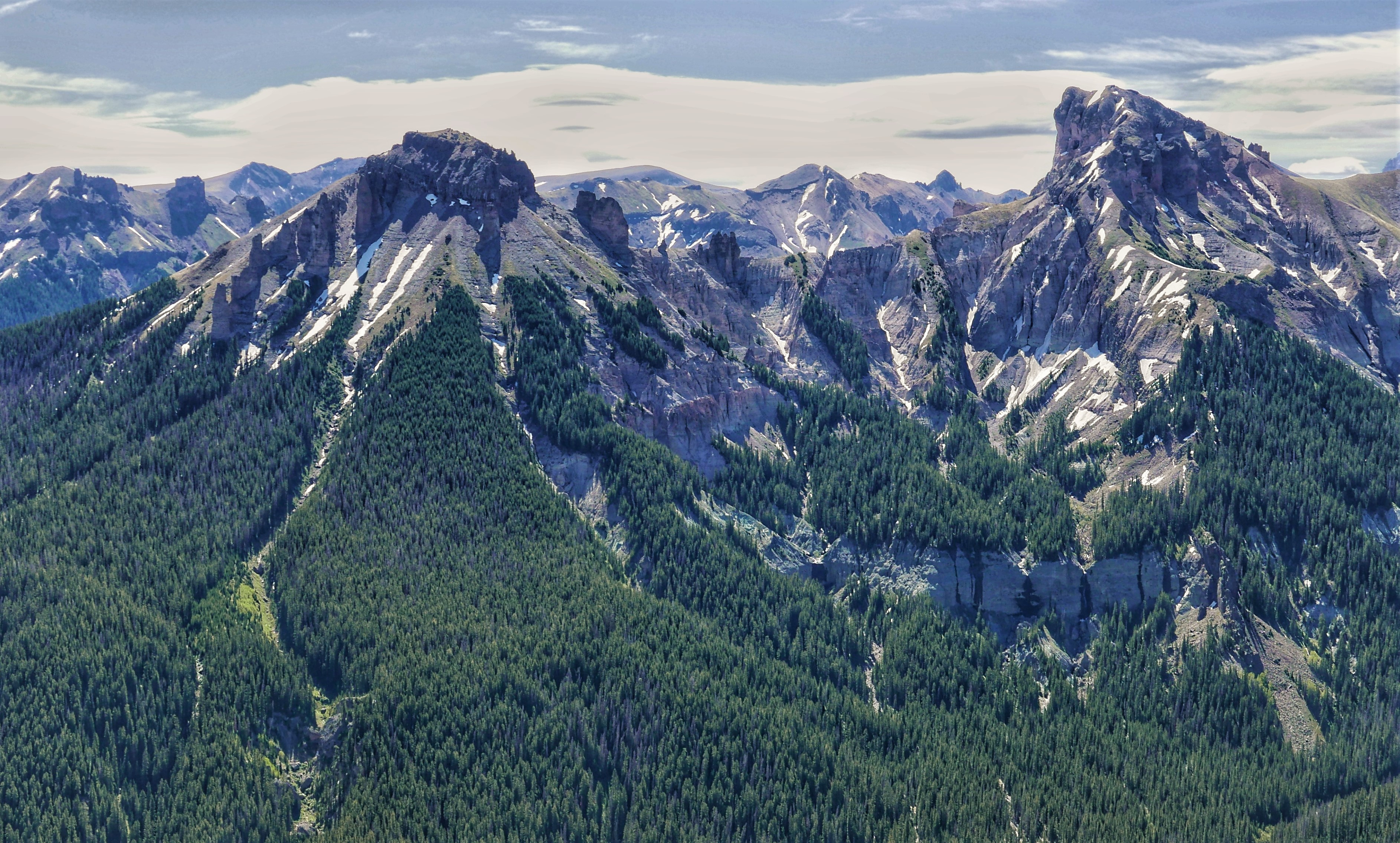
Dunsinane on the left, with Precipice Peak on the right. West aspect.

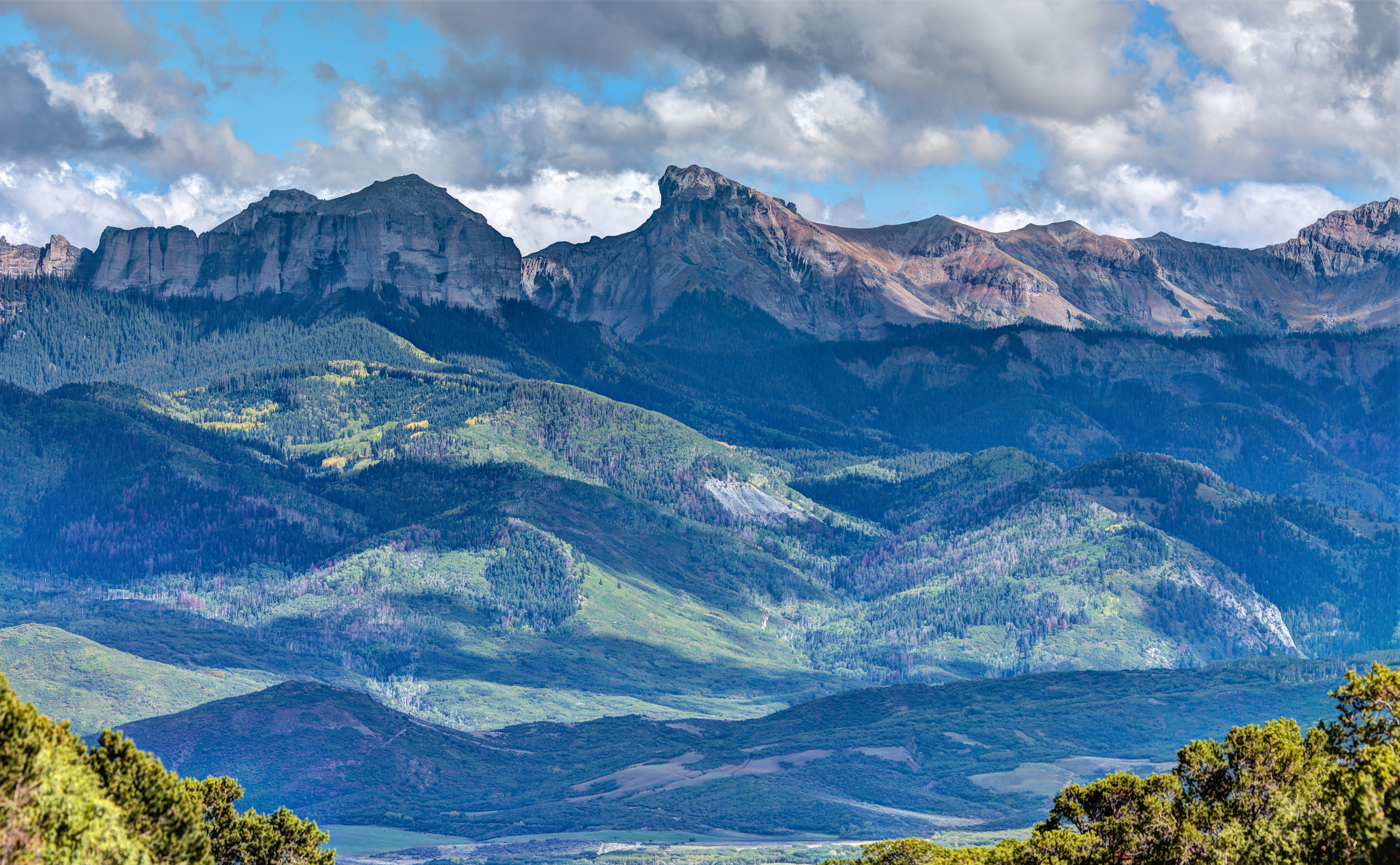
Precipice Peak centered, with Dunsinane Mountain on left. Camera pointed east.

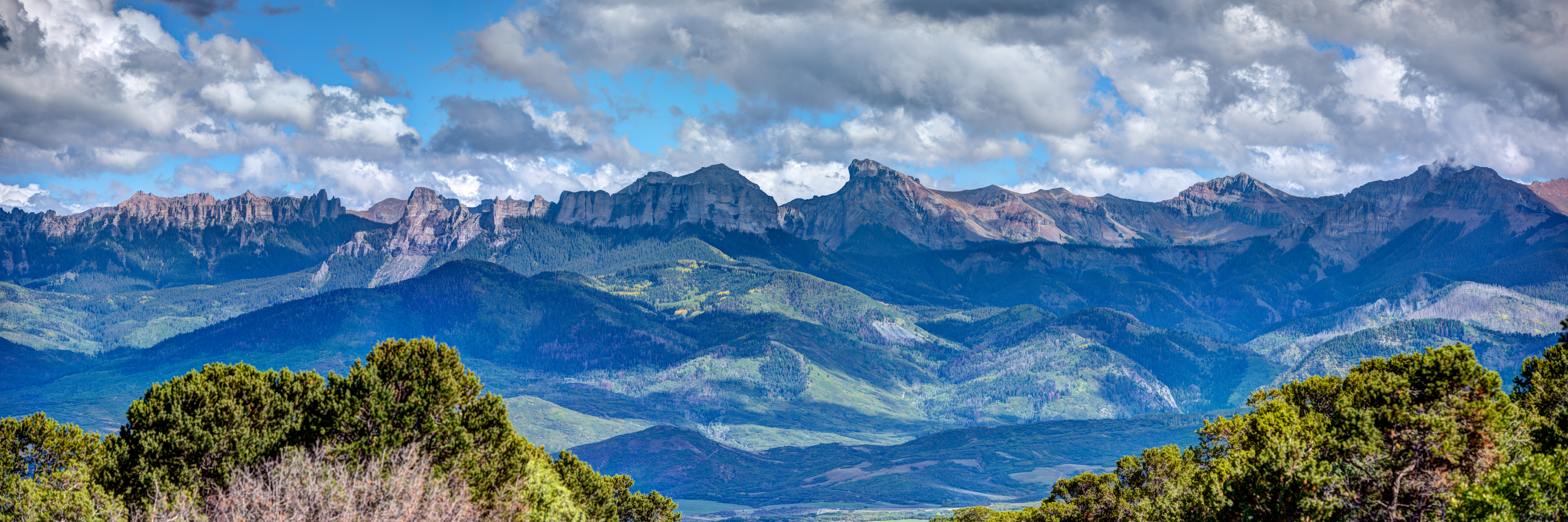

== See also ==
- Chimney Rock
- Mountains of Hinsdale County, Colorado
