= Precipice Peak =

Mountain in the state of Colorado

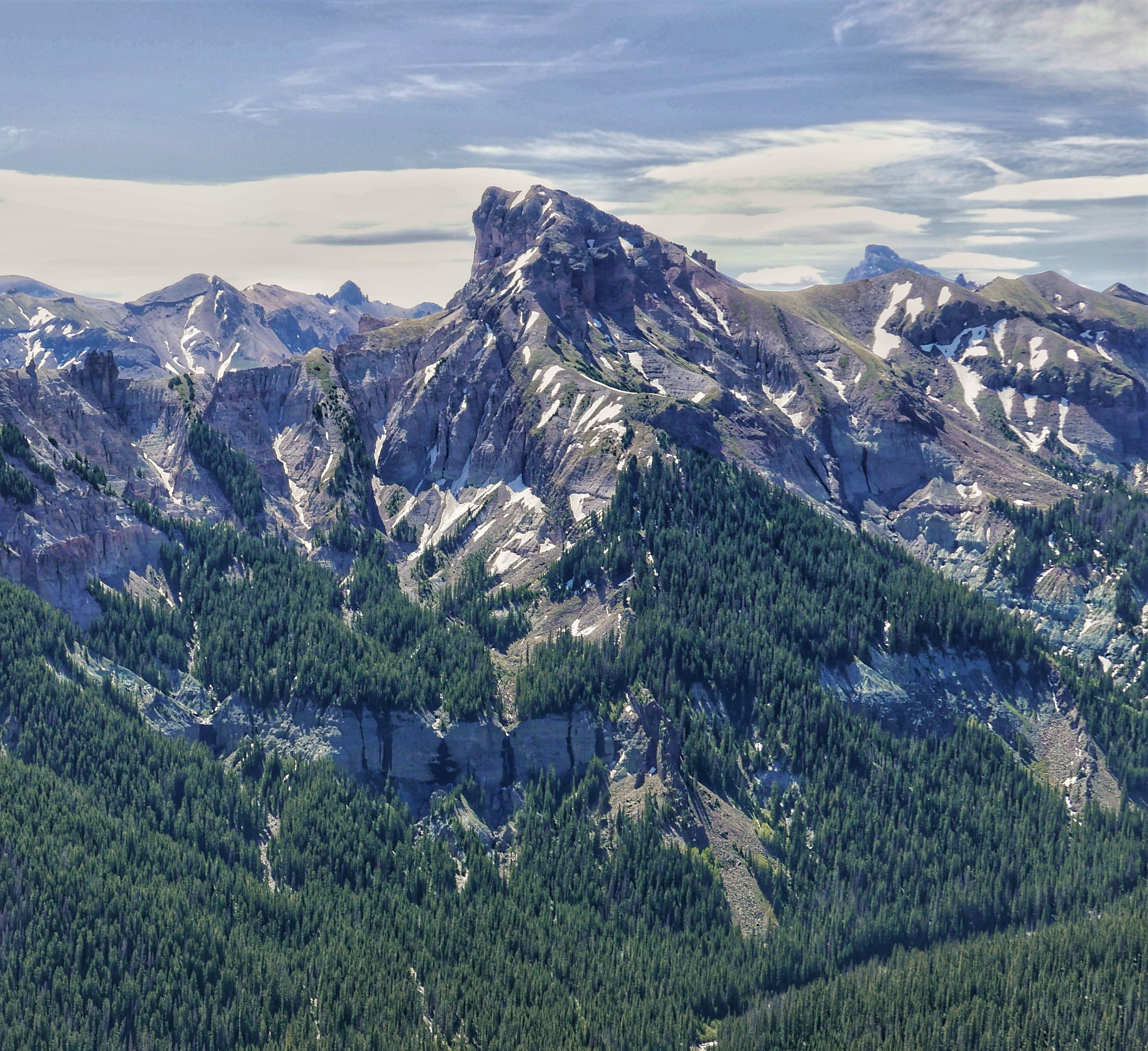
- Northwest aspect

Highest point
- Elevation: 13,144 ft (4,006 m)
- Prominence: 464 ft (141 m)
- Parent peak: Fortress Peak (13,241 ft)
- Isolation: 1.52 mi (2.45 km)
- Coordinates: 38°07′09″N 107°32′08″W

Naming
- Etymology: Precipice

Geography
- Location within Colorado Location within the United States
- Location: Hinsdale County; Colorado, US
- Parent range: Rocky Mountains; San Juan Mountains
- Topo map: USGS Wetterhorn Peak

Climbing
- Easiest route: class 2+ W slope, south ridge

Precipice Peak is a 13,144-foot-elevation (4,006-meter) mountain summit located in Hinsdale County, of Colorado, United States. It is situated 10.5 miles northeast of the community of Ouray, in the Uncompahgre Wilderness, on land managed by Uncompahgre National Forest. It is part of the San Juan Mountains which is a subset of the Rocky Mountains, and is situated west of the Continental Divide. Topographic relief is significant as the west aspect rises 2,500 feet (760 meters) above the West Fork Cimarron River valley in approximately one mile. Neighbors include Dunsinane Mountain three-quarters of a mile north, Courthouse Mountain 2.4 miles northwest, and Redcliff 2.2 miles south. The mountain's name was officially adopted by the United States Board on Geographic Names in 1966. It is so named because of a very prominent precipice on the mountain's east face.

== Climate ==
According to the Köppen climate classification system, Precipice Peak is located in an alpine subarctic climate zone with cold, snowy winters, and cool to warm summers. Due to its altitude, it receives precipitation all year, as snow in winter, and as thunderstorms in summer, with a dry period in late spring. Precipitation runoff from the mountain drains into tributaries of the Cimarron River.

== Gallery ==
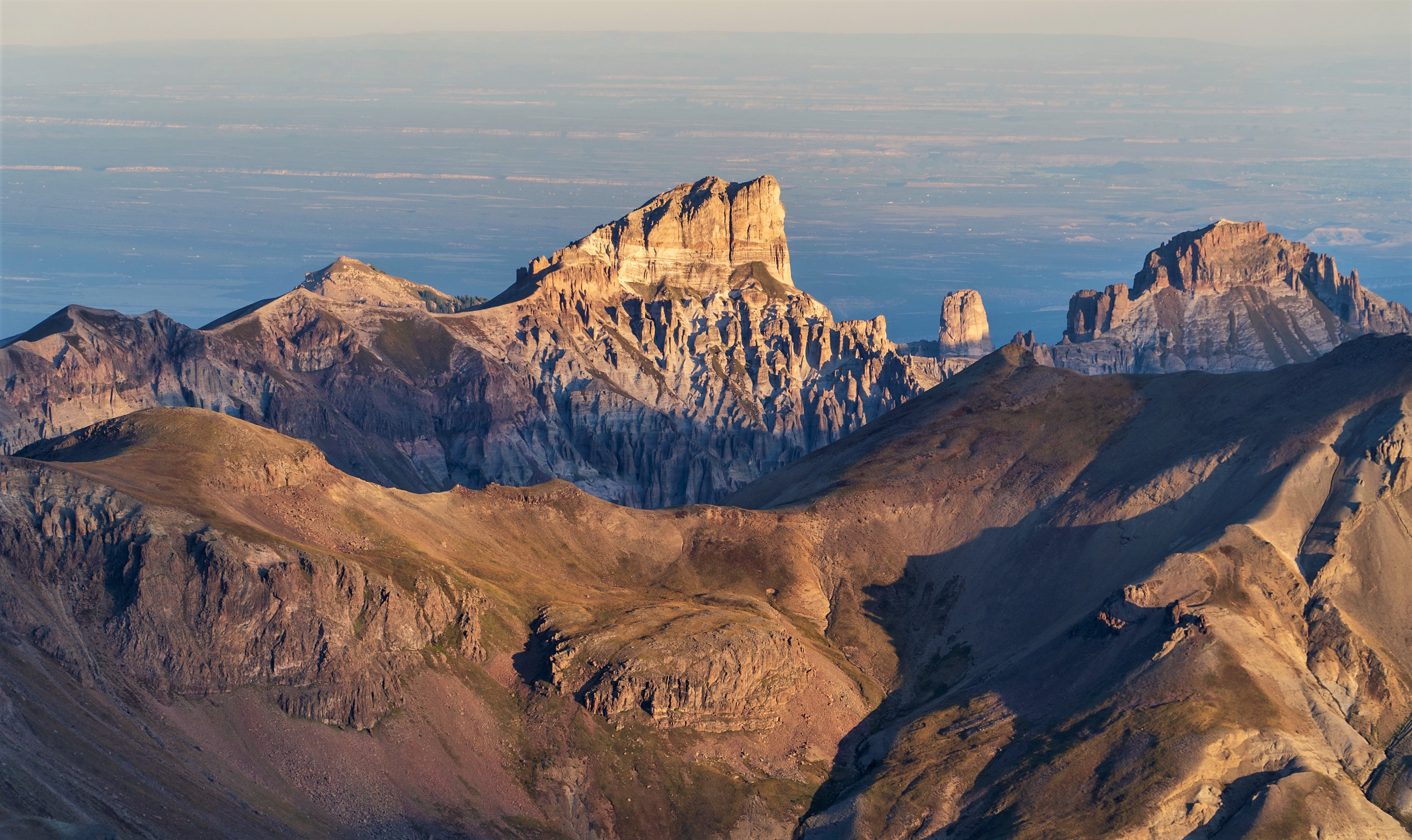
East aspect

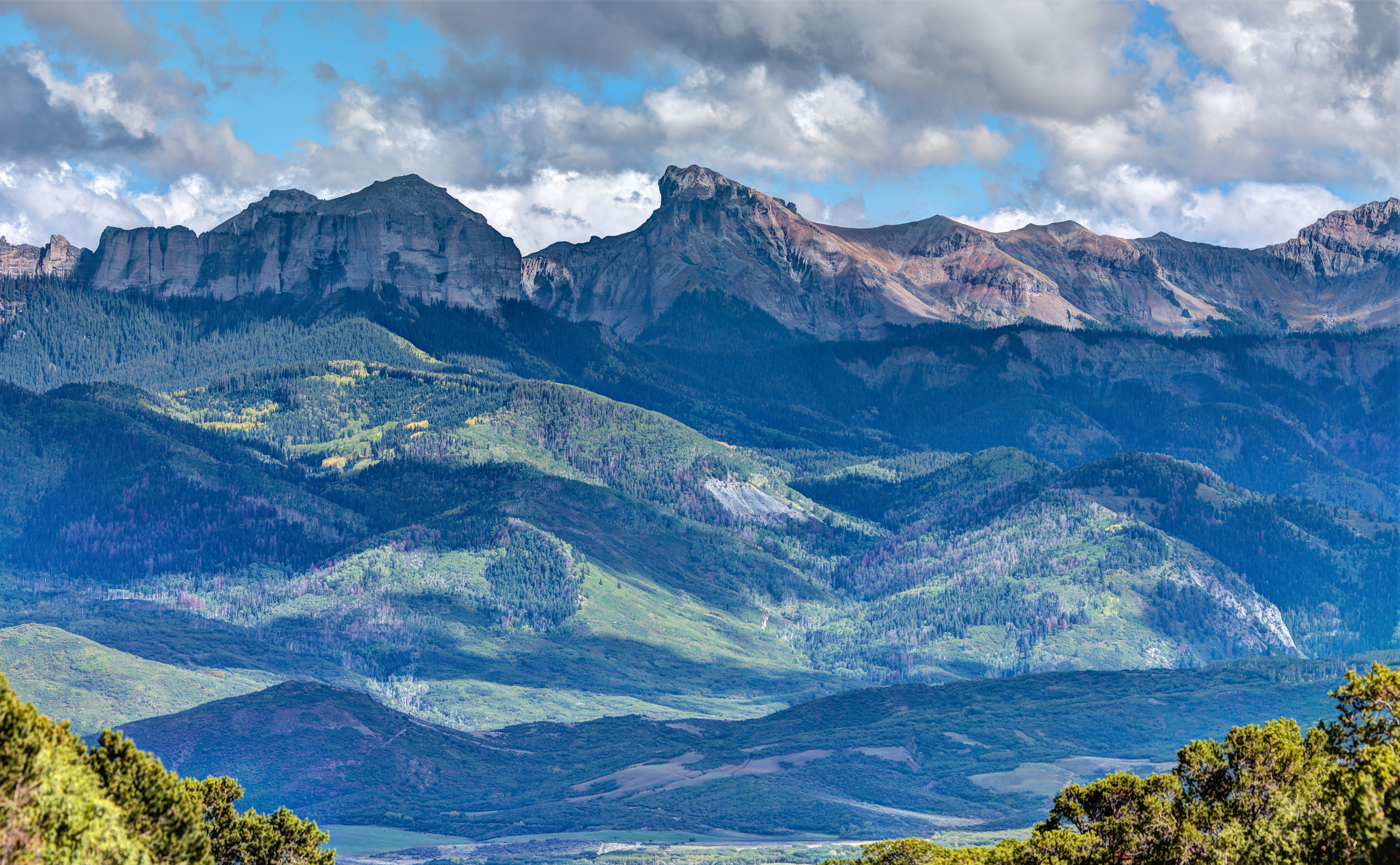
Precipice Peak centered, with Courthouse Mountain on left. Camera pointed east.

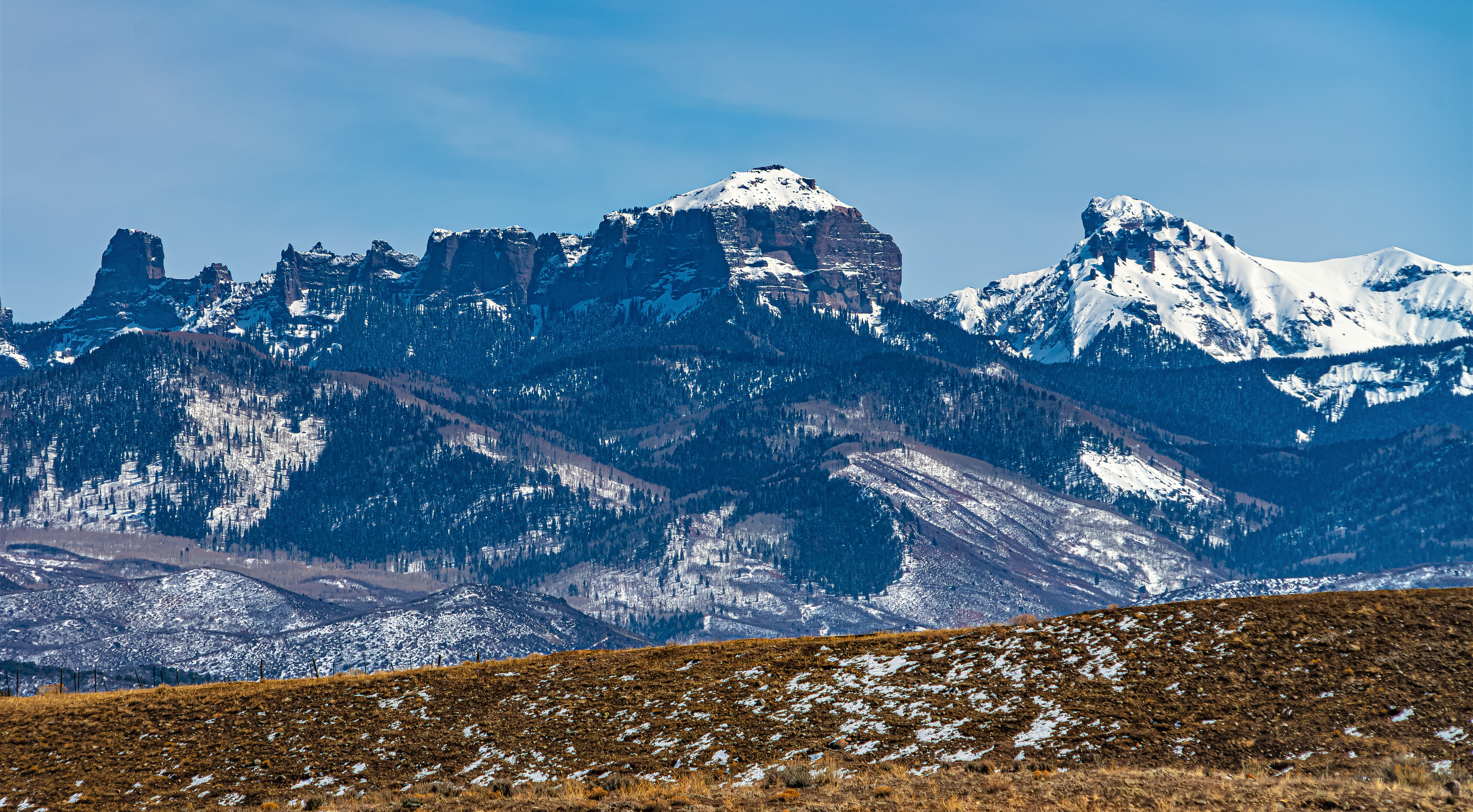
Chimney Rock (left), Courthouse Mountain (center), Precipice Peak (right)

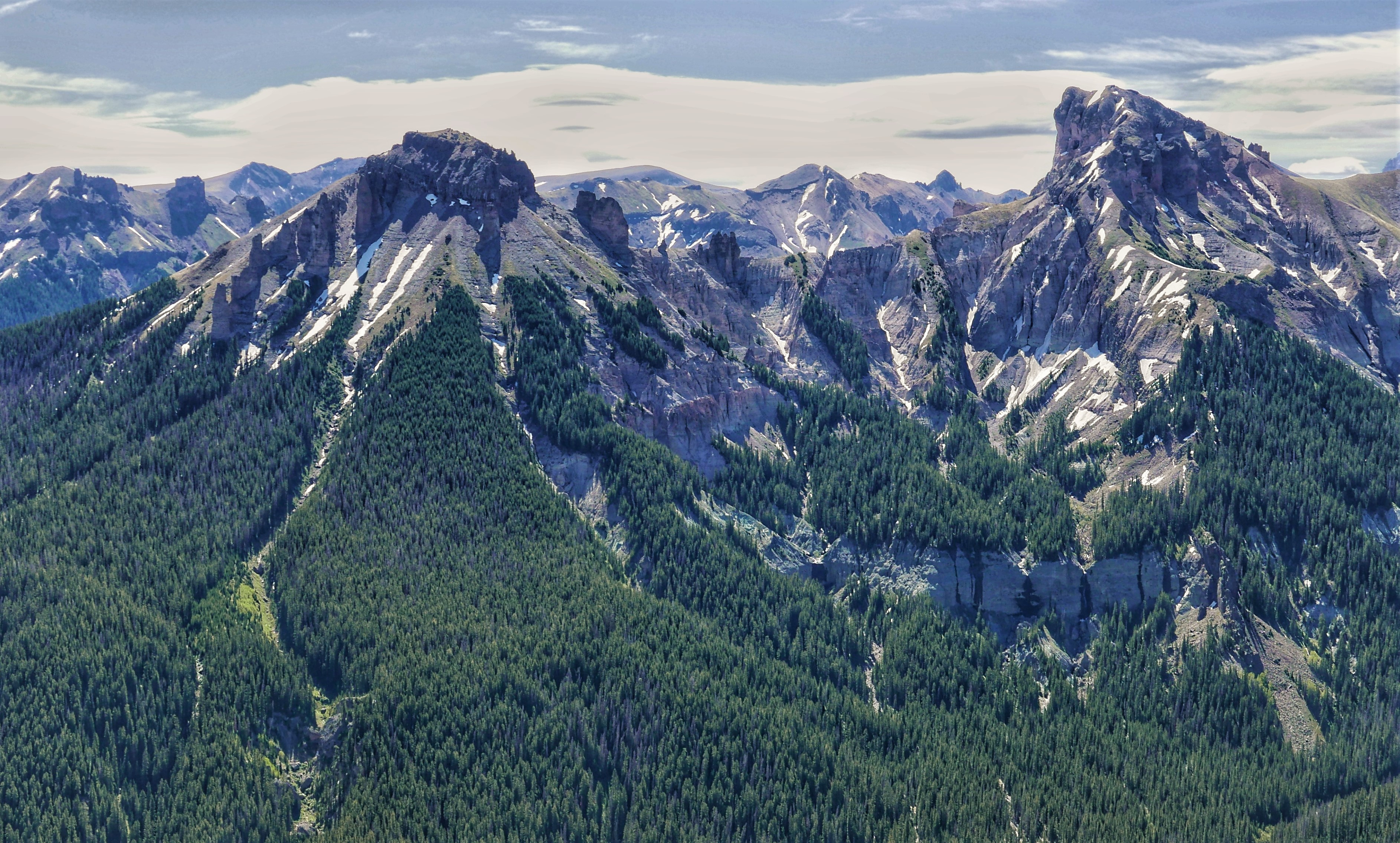
Dunsinane Mountain on the left, with Precipice Peak on the right. West aspect.

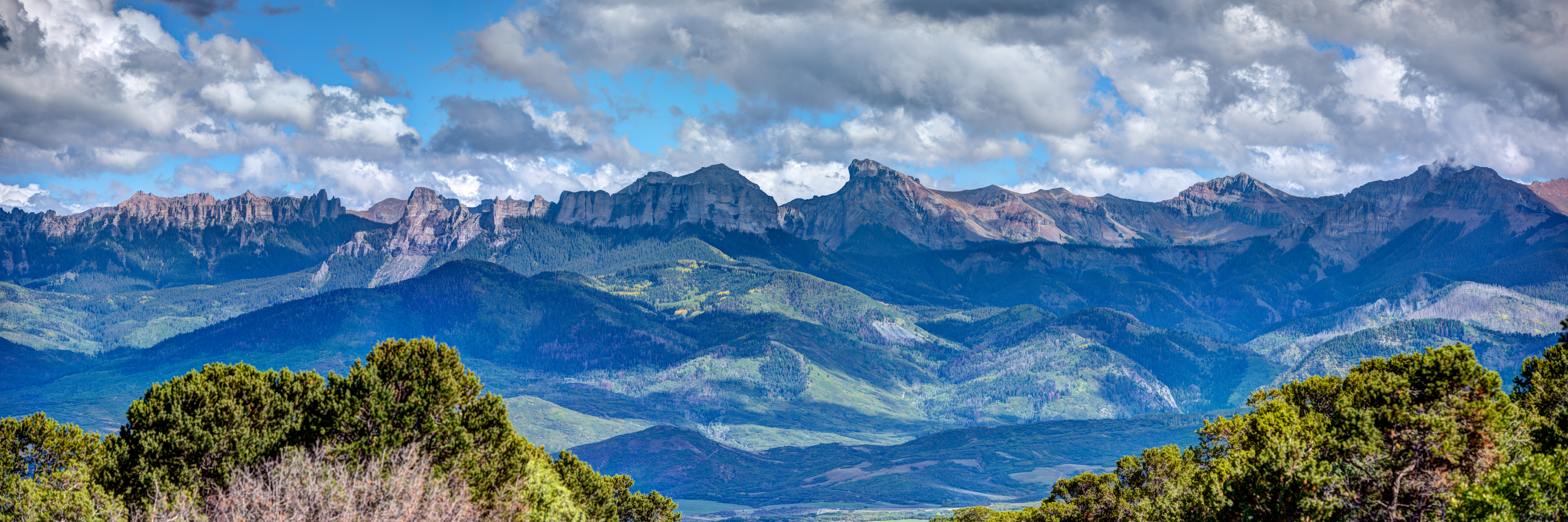
Courthouse and Precipice centered, Redcliff to far right

== See also ==
- Mountains of Hinsdale County, Colorado
