= Uncompahgre Peak =

Mountain in Colorado, United States

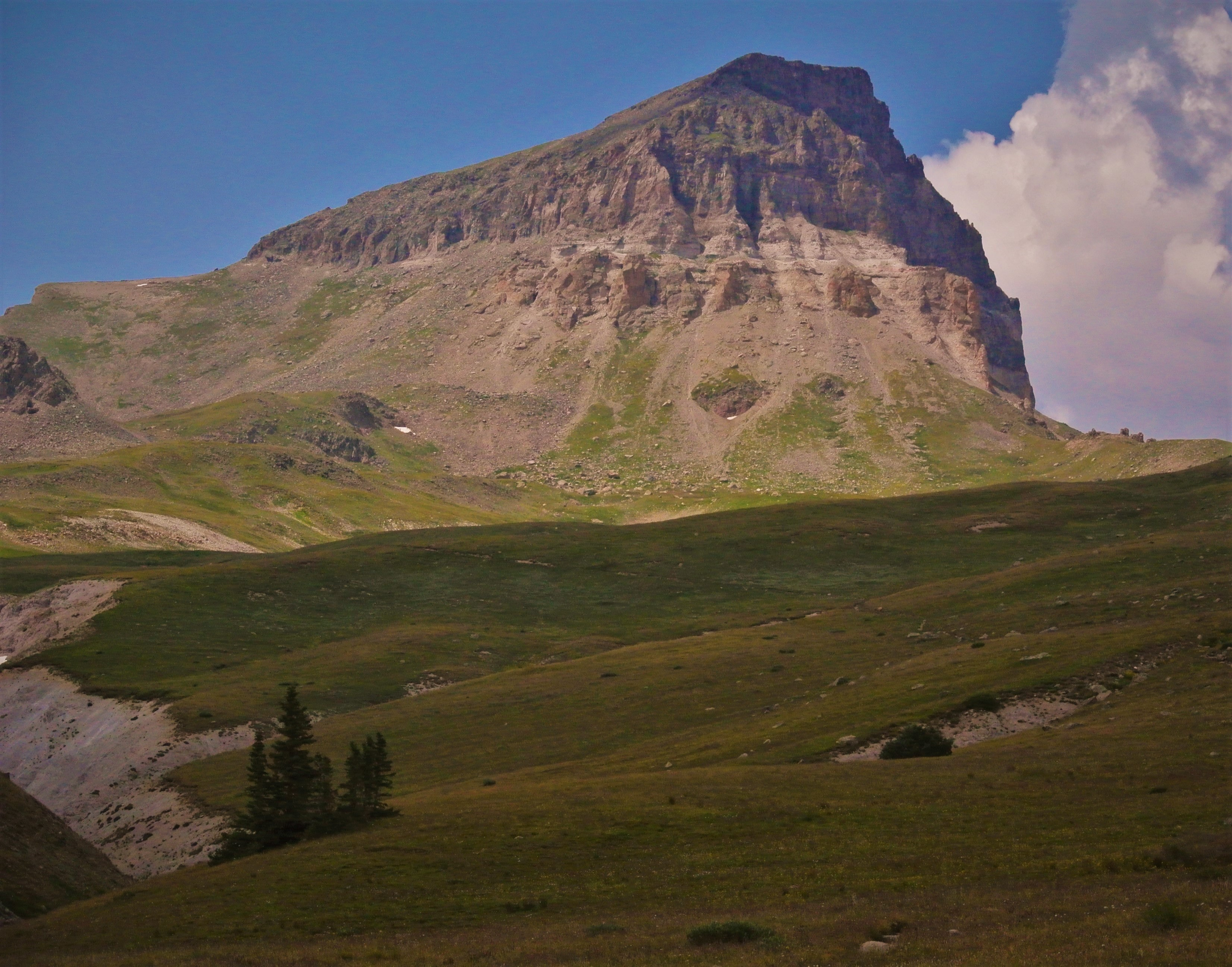
- Uncompahgre Peak from the east

Highest point
- Elevation: 14,315.8 ft (4,363.5 m); NAPGD2022
- Prominence: 4277 ft (1304 m)
- Isolation: 85.0 mi (136.8 km)
- Listing: North America highest peaks 35th; North America isolated peaks 68th; US highest major peaks 21st; Colorado highest major peaks 6th; Colorado fourteeners 6th; Colorado county high points 6th
- Coordinates: 38°04′18″N 107°27′44″W

Geography
- Location within Colorado
- Location: High point of Hinsdale County, Colorado, United States
- Parent range: Highest summit of the San Juan Mountains
- Topo map(s): USGS 7.5' topographic map Uncompahgre Peak, Colorado

Climbing
- Easiest route: South Ridge: Hike, class 2

Uncompahgre Peak (/ənkəmˈpɑːɡreɪ/) is the sixth highest summit of the Rocky Mountains of North America and the U.S. state of Colorado. The prominent 14,316-foot (4363.46 m) fourteener is the highest summit of the San Juan Mountains and the highest point in the drainage basin of the Colorado River and the Gulf of California. It is located in the Uncompahgre Wilderness in the northern San Juans, in northern Hinsdale County approximately 7 miles (11 km) west of the town of Lake City.

Uncompahgre Peak has a broad summit plateau, rising about 1,500 ft (500 m) above the broad surrounding alpine basins. The south, east and west sides are not particularly steep, but the north face has a 700 ft (210 m) cliff. Like all peaks in the San Juan Mountains, Uncompahgre is of volcanic origin, but is not a volcano. The rock is of poor quality for climbing, precluding an ascent of the north face.

The most popular route for climbing Uncompahgre Peak is Uncompahgre National Forest Service Trail Number 239, which starts from the end of the Nellie Creek Road, east-southeast of the peak. The Nellie Creek Road is a four wheel drive road accessed from the Henson Creek Road, about 4 miles (6.4 km) west of Lake City. The trail to the summit is a strenuous hike rising 2,919 ft (890 m) in elevation in about 3.5 mi (6 km). It accesses the summit in a winding ascent, starting from the east, passing over a south-trending ridge, and finishing on the west slopes of the summit plateau.

There is also a route up Uncompahgre starting at the Matterhorn Creek trailhead. It is popular among hikers preferring to avoid the 4wd Nellie Creek road.

The peak's name comes from the Ute word Uncompaghre, which loosely translates to "dirty water" or "red water spring" and is likely a reference to the many hot springs in the vicinity of Ouray, Colorado. (Note: In the journal of Francisco Silvestre Vélez de Escalante's 1776 expedition the author states that the Native American name for the Uncompahgre River was Ancapagari, which translated to Spanish as Laguna Colorado and referred to a hot, bad tasting, red lake from which its waters came. The Spanish name for the river at that time was Rio de San Francisco, apparently so named by explorer Juan Maria de Rivera on one of his two earlier expeditions (1761 and 1765).)

Over several days beginning on September 10, 1894, a detachment of the U.S. Army Signal Corps established the world heliograph record from stations atop Mount Ellen, Utah and Mount Uncompahgre, Colorado. The record for visual signaling was established utilizing mirrors 8 inches across and telescopes. The flashing signals communicated over a distance of 183 miles.

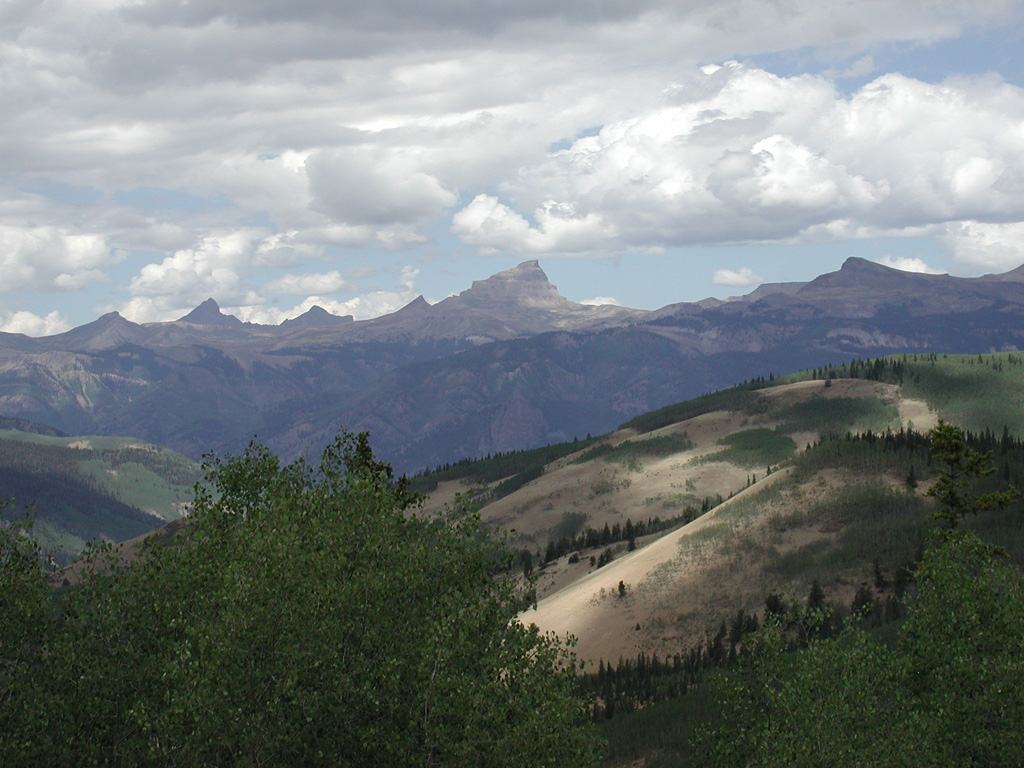
Uncompahgre Peak (center) and the San Juans from Slumgullion Pass, July 2002

== Climate ==
Climate data for Uncompahgre Peak 38.0651 N, 107.4588 W, Elevation: 13,369 ft (4,075 m) (1991–2020 normals)
Month	Jan	Feb	Mar	Apr	May	Jun	Jul	Aug	Sep	Oct	Nov	Dec	Year
Mean daily maximum °F (°C)	24.4 (−4.2)	24.2 (−4.3)	29.3 (−1.5)	34.7 (1.5)	43.0 (6.1)	54.4 (12.4)	59.1 (15.1)	56.8 (13.8)	51.2 (10.7)	41.7 (5.4)	31.1 (−0.5)	24.5 (−4.2)	39.5 (4.2)
Daily mean °F (°C)	12.8 (−10.7)	12.2 (−11.0)	16.8 (−8.4)	21.8 (−5.7)	30.3 (−0.9)	40.8 (4.9)	45.8 (7.7)	44.2 (6.8)	38.6 (3.7)	29.3 (−1.5)	19.8 (−6.8)	13.2 (−10.4)	27.1 (−2.7)
Mean daily minimum °F (°C)	1.1 (−17.2)	0.3 (−17.6)	4.2 (−15.4)	8.9 (−12.8)	17.6 (−8.0)	27.2 (−2.7)	32.5 (0.3)	31.5 (−0.3)	26.0 (−3.3)	16.9 (−8.4)	8.5 (−13.1)	1.9 (−16.7)	14.7 (−9.6)
Average precipitation inches (mm)	4.15 (105)	4.36 (111)	4.34 (110)	4.36 (111)	2.74 (70)	1.20 (30)	2.91 (74)	3.18 (81)	3.80 (97)	3.94 (100)	4.14 (105)	4.18 (106)	43.3 (1,100)
Source: PRISM Climate Group

== Historical names ==
- Mount Chauvenet - 1873
- Unca-pah-gre Mountain
- Uncompahgre Mountain
- Uncompahgre Peak – 1907

== See also ==
- List of mountain peaks in North America
  - List of mountain peaks of the United States
    - List of mountain peaks of Colorado
      - List of Colorado county high points
      - List of Colorado fourteeners
