= Wetterhorn Peak =

Mountain in Colorado, United States

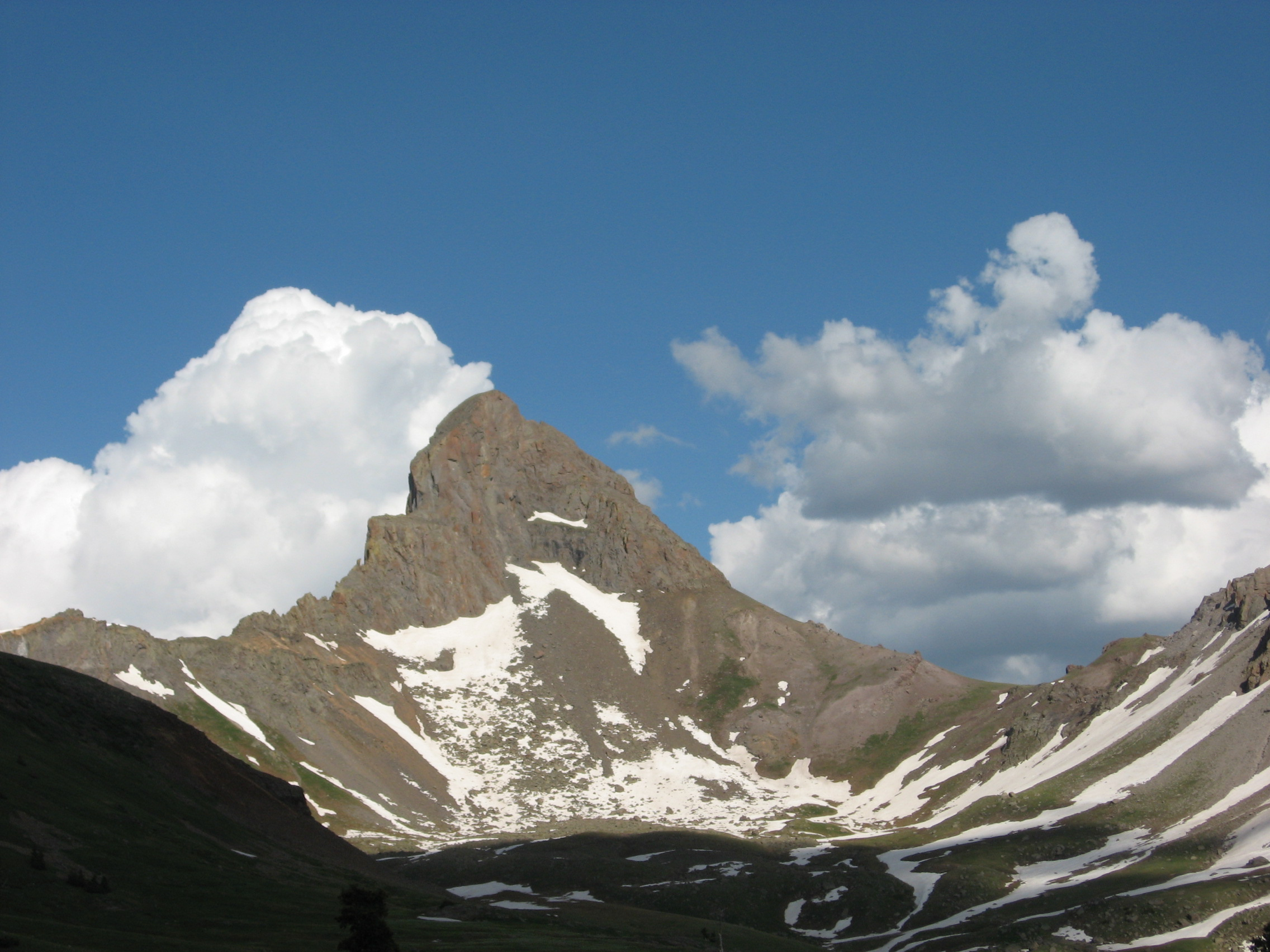

Highest point
- Elevation: 14,018.9 ft (4,273.0 m); NAPGD2022
- Prominence: 1,635 ft (498 m)
- Parent peak: Uncompahgre Peak
- Isolation: 2.77 mi (4.46 km)
- Listing: Colorado Fourteener 50th
- Coordinates: 38°03′38″N 107°30′39″W

Naming
- English translation: Weather Peak
- Language of name: German

Geography
- Location within Colorado
- Location: Hinsdale and Ouray counties, Colorado, United States
- Parent range: San Juan Mountains
- Topo map(s): USGS 7.5' topographic map Wetterhorn Peak, Colorado

Climbing
- First ascent: 1906 by George Barnard, C. Smedley, W. P. Smedley, D. Utter (first recorded ascent)
- Easiest route: Southeast Ridge: Scramble, class 3

Wetterhorn Peak (German: Wetterhorn, literally "weather horn") is a fourteen thousand-foot mountain peak in the U.S. state of Colorado. It is located in the Uncompahgre Wilderness of the northern San Juan Mountains, in northwestern Hinsdale County and southeastern Ouray County, approximately 9 miles (14 km) east of the town of Ouray and 2.75 mi (4.4 km) west of Uncompahgre Peak.

Wetterhorn Peak and neighboring Matterhorn Peak (13,590 ft (4,142 m)) are named after the Wetterhorn and the Matterhorn, two famous peaks in the Swiss Alps. Both Colorado peaks are pointed rock spires (hence resembling their namesake peaks), whose shapes contrast with the broad bulk of the higher Uncompahgre Peak.

The first recorded ascent of Colorado's Wetterhorn was made in 1906 by George Barnard, C. Smedley, W. P. Smedley, and D. Utter, but a previous ascent by miners working in the area in the 19th century is likely.

The standard route to the summit of Wetterhorn Peak ascends the southeast ridge, which is accessed via the Matterhorn Creek drainage on the south side of the mountain. The trailhead is on the Henson Creek Road, accessible from Lake City. The route involves 3,535 ft (1,077 m) of ascent from the trailhead and some exposed scrambling (Class 3/4) on the ridge itself. The nearby east face is considered a high-quality advanced snow climb or extreme ski descent.

== See also ==
- List of mountain peaks of Colorado
  - List of Colorado fourteeners
