= Geology of Colorado =

Coordinates: 38.9972°N 105.5478°W

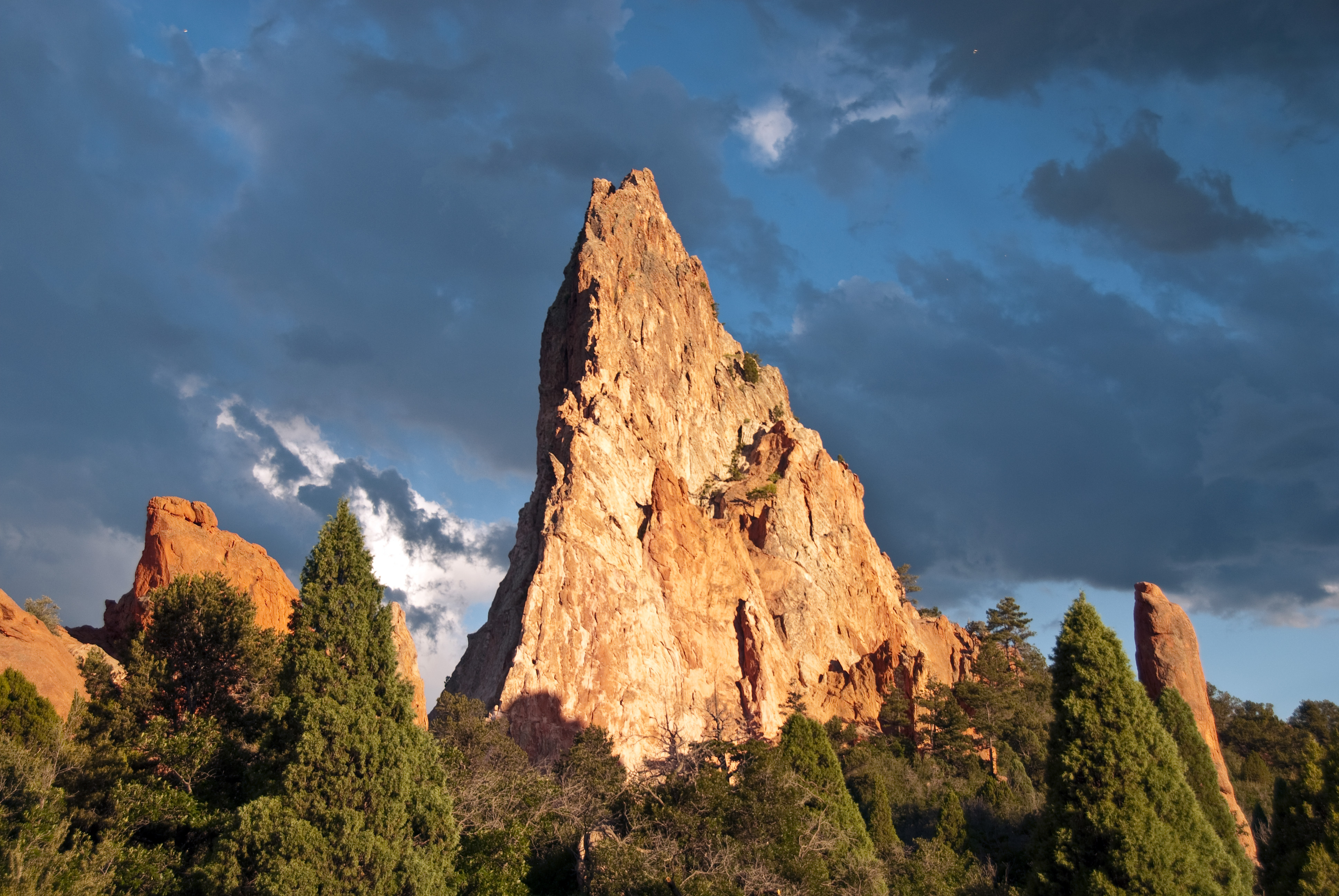
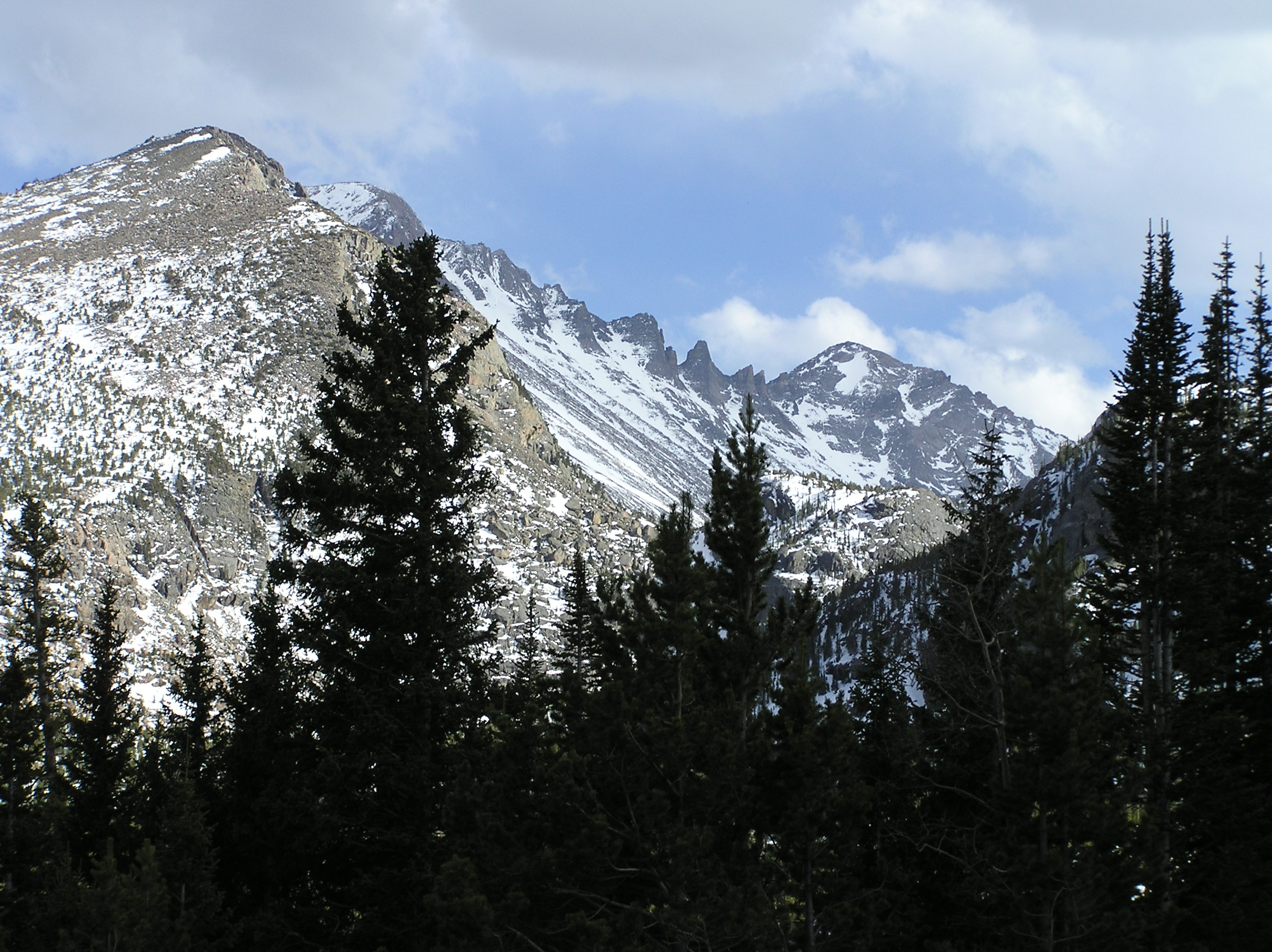
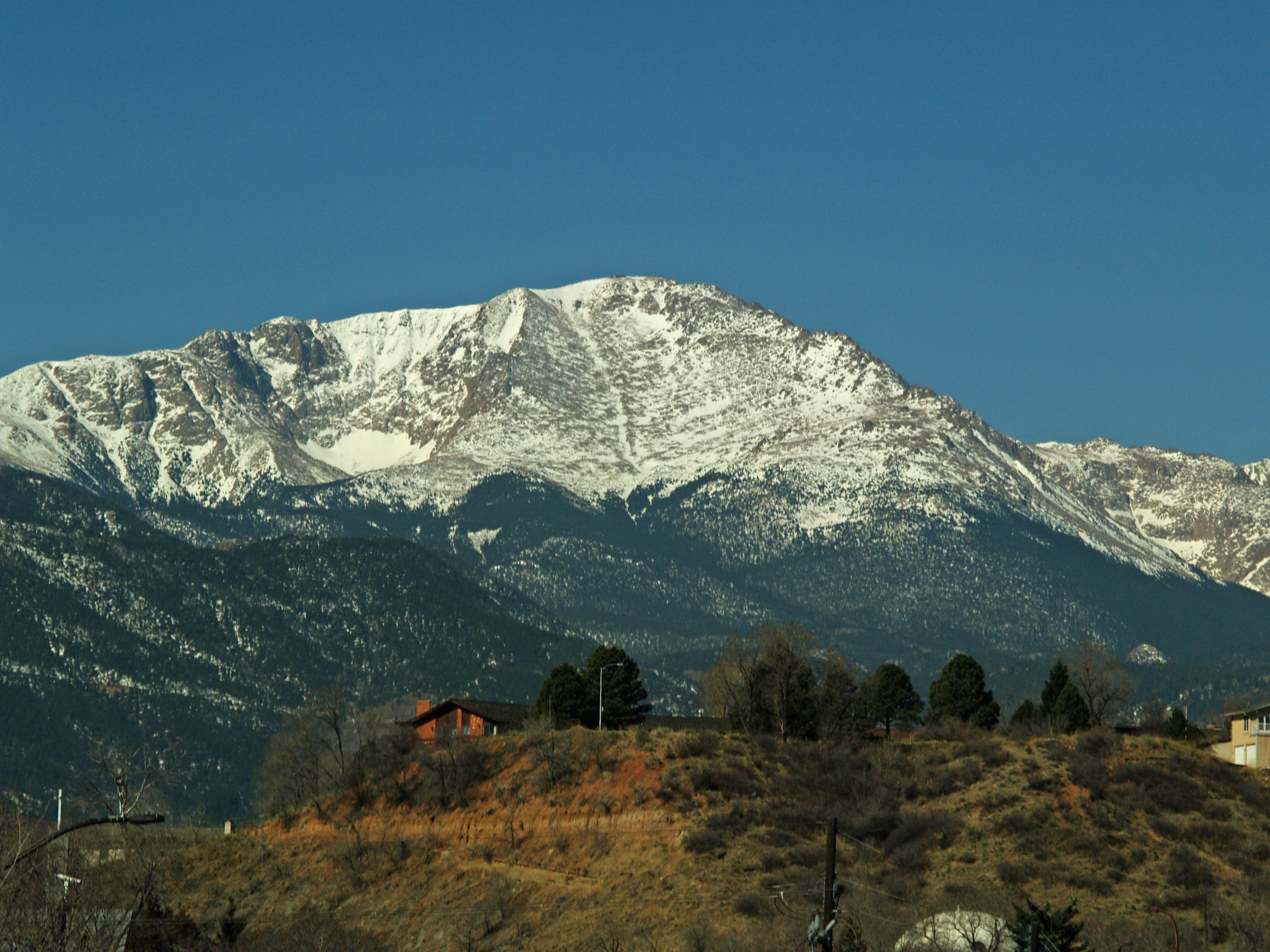
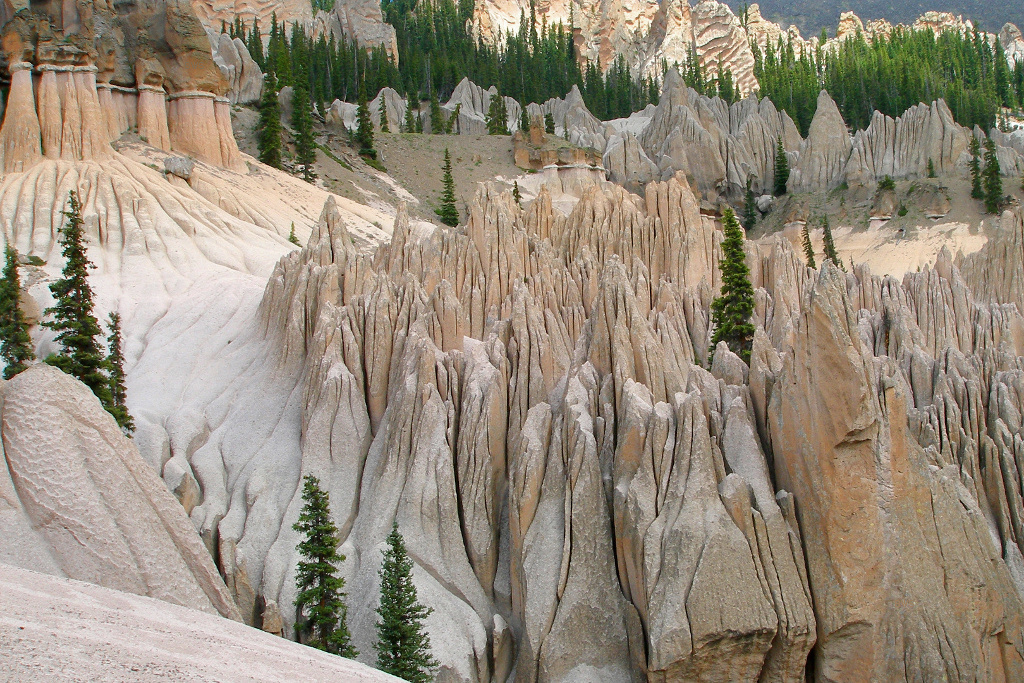
Clockwise from upper left: Garden of the Gods, Rocky Mountain National Park, Pikes Peak, Wheeler Geologic Area

The bedrock under the U.S. State of Colorado was assembled from island arcs accreted onto the edge of the ancient Wyoming Craton. The Sonoma orogeny uplifted the ancestral Rocky Mountains in parallel with the diversification of multicellular life. Shallow seas covered the regions, followed by the uplift current Rocky Mountains and intense volcanic activity. Colorado has thick sedimentary sequences with oil, gas and coal deposits, as well as base metals and other minerals.

== Stratigraphy, tectonics and geologic history ==
In the early Proterozoic, between 1.78 and 1.65 billion years ago, the continental crust of Colorado was assembled from several older island arcs, along the coast of the Archean Wyoming Craton. The Colorado Province took shape as a mobile belt—an area of thinner, orogeny related continental crust lacking the deep "keel" of rock, which stabilized the neighboring Wyoming Craton and other cratons like it. Throughout Colorado's geologic history, rocks have often been deformed, metamorphosed and overprinted, obscuring the ancient record. Beginning 1.7 billion years ago granite and pegmatite intruded. The Routt Plutonic Suite is dated to 1.66 to 1.79 billion years old and is an important rock formation in Rocky Mountain National Park and Buffalo Mountain.

The Berthoud orogeny from 1.45 to 1.35 billion years ago created granite intrusions, uplifts, rifts and ductile shear zones, grouped as the Berthoud Plutonic Suite. The Grenville orogeny intruded large granites throughout much of Laurentia, the Proto-North American continent, although Pike's Peak was the only location significantly affected by Grenville granite intrusions in Colorado. The region's crystalline basement rock finished forming with a massive batholith 1.1 billion years ago. The breakup of Rodinia one of the oldest supercontinents, produced rifts between 900 million and 600 million years ago in the Neoproterozoic. These deep extensional basement faults filled with sediments, such as the Uinta rift basin and were often reactivated more recently in Earth history by orogenies. The Uinta Formation and Uncompahgre Formation are both examples of remnant Precambrian rift basin sediments. The end of the Neoproterozoic is not known from the rock record, indicating a period of long-running terrestrial erosion which produced by the Great Unconformity, from 1.1 billion to 510 million years ago. Ten kilometers of basement rock and almost all Precambrian sediments eroded away.

=== Paleozoic (539-251 million years ago) ===
In the Paleozoic, as multicellular life became common, Colorado was covered in a shallow tropical sea. Thick sequences of sandstone, shale and limestone were laid down on the Precambrian bedrock. The Sonoma orogeny uplifted the ancestral Rocky Mountains around 300 million years ago, which reached heights of around 10,000 feet. The Laurentian continent was colliding with the supercontinent Gondwana to the south, to form the larger supercontinent Pangaea. This continental collision generated two large island mountain ranges, the Frontrangia and Uncompahgria. Erosion quickly wore away at the mountains, shedding sediments across the landscape.

=== Mesozoic (251-66 million years ago) ===
Dark red Triassic shale and wind-blown sands transformed into sandstone overlie Permian rocks, marking the beginning of the Mesozoic. The sea reached western Colorado and the area was blanketed in ash fall from eruptions to the west. Early Jurassic dune sands were covered over by the sandstone and shale of the Morrison Formation, until a large scale marine transgression flooded the region in the Cretaceous. As sea levels fell, the Dakota Formation sands and pebbles took shape, followed by another marine transgression that deposited several thousand feet of shale as the Mancos Formation and Pierre Formation. Intermediate water depths filled with the Niobrara limestone. Sand layers point to periodic regression and shale layers contain extensive marine fossils.

With the beginning of the Laramide orogeny that uplifted the Rocky Mountains, coastal wetlands formed large coal deposits. Thick coal and sandstone layers that grow thicker to the west are known as the Mesaverde Group.

=== Cenozoic (66 million years ago-present) ===
The Laramide orogeny continued in the Cenozoic up until the Eocene with tectonic forces shifting from north–south mountain ranges to east–west. The Uinta Range is unique, trending east–west due to older tectonic constraints. In the Denver Basin, the Denver Formation and Dawson Formation formed in the Paleocene from sand and gravel eroded out of the Rockies. To the west, rivers filled the lowlands with the Wastach Formation. Erosion and uplift occurred in sync, creating mountains that tended to have gradual slopes.

After the end of uplift 20 million years ago, erosion cut down to bedrock in the mountains. In the northwest, the Green River Formation siltstones formed as a lake deposit in a basin formed along Proterozoic faults and was covered over with siltstone and sandstone of the Uinta Formation.

Together with Utah and Nevada, Farallon Plate related volcanism in the Oligocene produced enormous eruptions that built up the San Juan Mountains in the southwest. One third of the region was covered in ash flow. Throughout the Miocene, large scale regional uplift elevated Colorado, New Mexico, Utah and Arizona 5000 feet above sea level.

Erosion in the Pliocene downcut sedimentary rocks, reaching the Precambrian basement and forming the channels of Colorado River tributaries such as the Gunnison, Green, Dolores and Yampa rivers. During the Pleistocene, glaciers formed in the mountains, carving out valleys and straightening streams.

== See also ==
- Bibliography of Colorado
- Geography of Colorado
- Geology of the Rocky Mountains
- History of Colorado
- Index of Colorado-related articles
- List of Colorado-related lists
- Outline of Colorado
