= Uncompahgre National Forest =

National Forest in western Colorado, United States

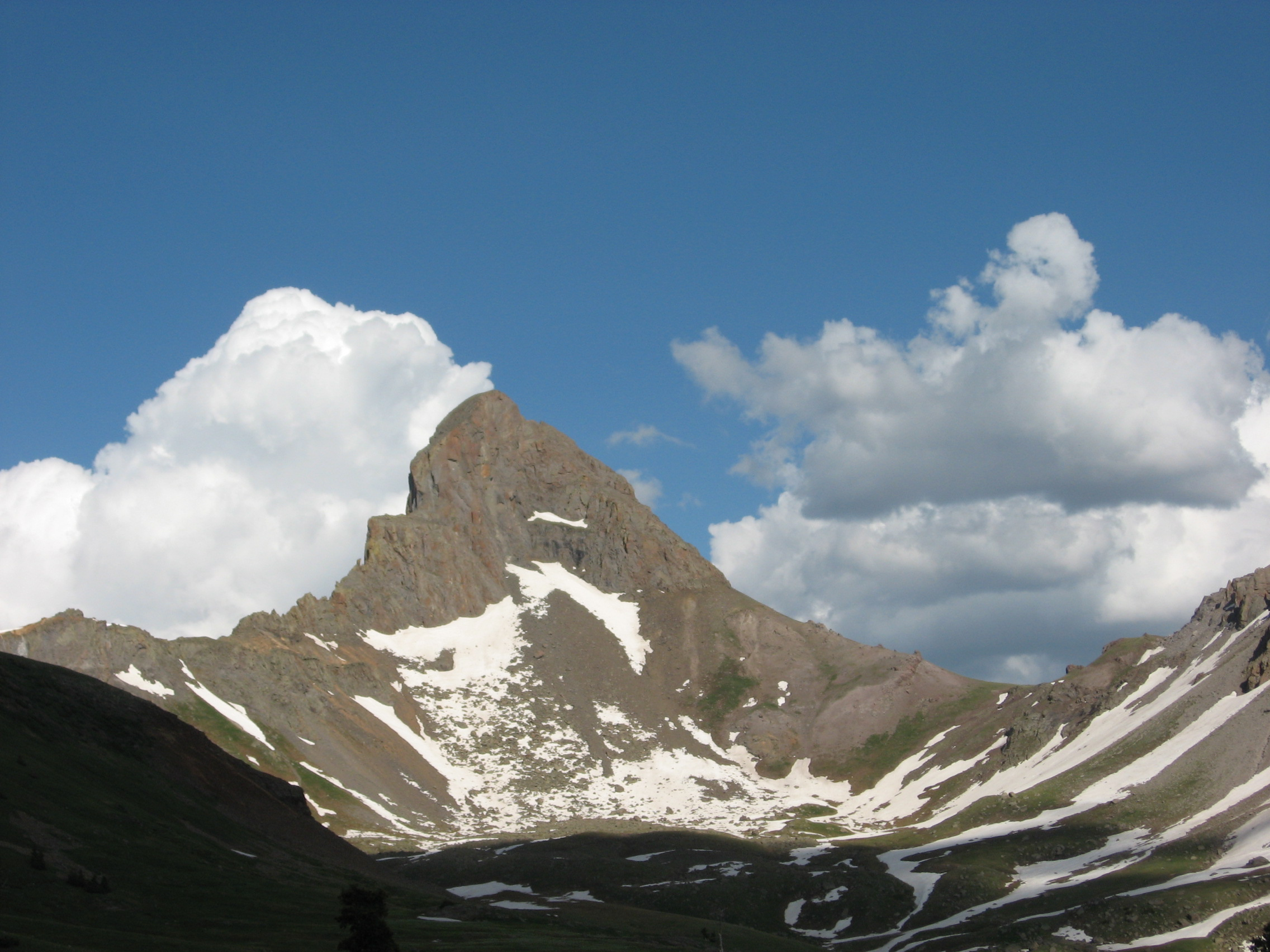
- Wetterhorn Peak in Uncompahgre National Forest

- Location within the United States
- Location: Colorado, United States
- Nearest city: Montrose, CO
- Coordinates: 37.983°N 107.782°W
- Area: 955,229 acres (3,865.67 km^{2})
- Established: June 14, 1905
- Governing body: U.S. Forest Service
- Website: Grand Mesa Uncompahgre and Gunnison National Forests

Uncompahgre National Forest is a U.S. National Forest covering 955,229 acres (1,492.55 sq mi, or 3,865.68 km^{2}) in (in descending order of land area) parts of Montrose, Mesa, San Miguel, Ouray, Gunnison, Hinsdale, San Juan, and Delta Counties in western Colorado. Its headquarters are in Delta County, in the city of Delta. It borders the San Juan National Forest to the south.

Within the national forest boundaries can be found the arid Uncompahgre Plateau and the northern portion of the San Juan Mountains. The forest contains three alpine wilderness areas: Uncompahgre (formerly the Big Blue Wilderness), Mount Sneffels, and Lizard Head.

Uncompahgre National Forest was established on June 14, 1905. The Uncompahgre, Grand Mesa, and Gunnison National Forests were all administered separately until 1954, when Grand Mesa and Uncompahgre started to be administered as a single unit, with Gunnison added in 1973. Today, Uncompahgre National Forest is administered jointly with the Grand Mesa and Gunnison National Forests from the Forest Supervisor's Office in Delta, Colorado. There are local ranger district offices located in Montrose, Gunnison, and Norwood.

== Recreation ==
The varied climate, sparse population, and abundance of sun make the Uncompahgre National Forest popular with jeepers, ATV'ers, sightseers, and hikers. A common recreational activity within the Forest boundaries is scenic driving, thanks in part to the Million Dollar Highway. Some other local attractions include Trout Lake and Bridal Veil Falls, near Telluride.

There are several dirt roads within the Uncompahgre; some are mining roads left from the 1800s mineral rush, others are occasionally used by the Forest Service. Paved roads include the San Juan Skyway, Alpine Loop, the Unaweep-Tabeguache Scenic and Historic Byway, and Owl Creek Pass, which is gravel.

In 2024, the Grand Mesa, Uncompahgre and Gunnison National Forests purchased the West Gold Hill Dinosaur Tracksite near Ouray, Colorado. The trackway includes 134 fossilized footsteps of a sauropod from the Late Jurassic. It is the world's only existing example of a 270-degree looped turn and has the most continuous steps.

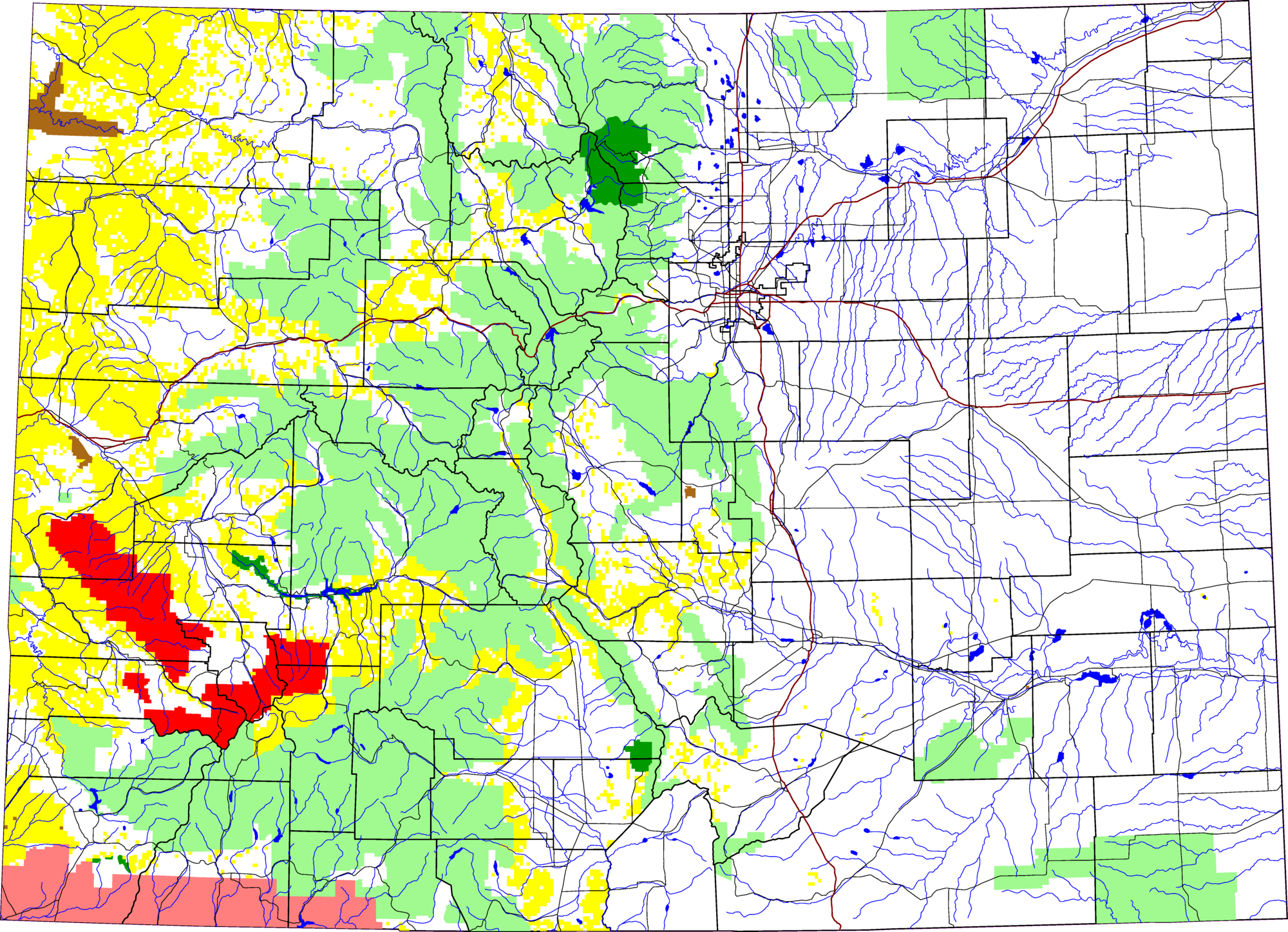
Colorado with Uncompahgre National Forest in red

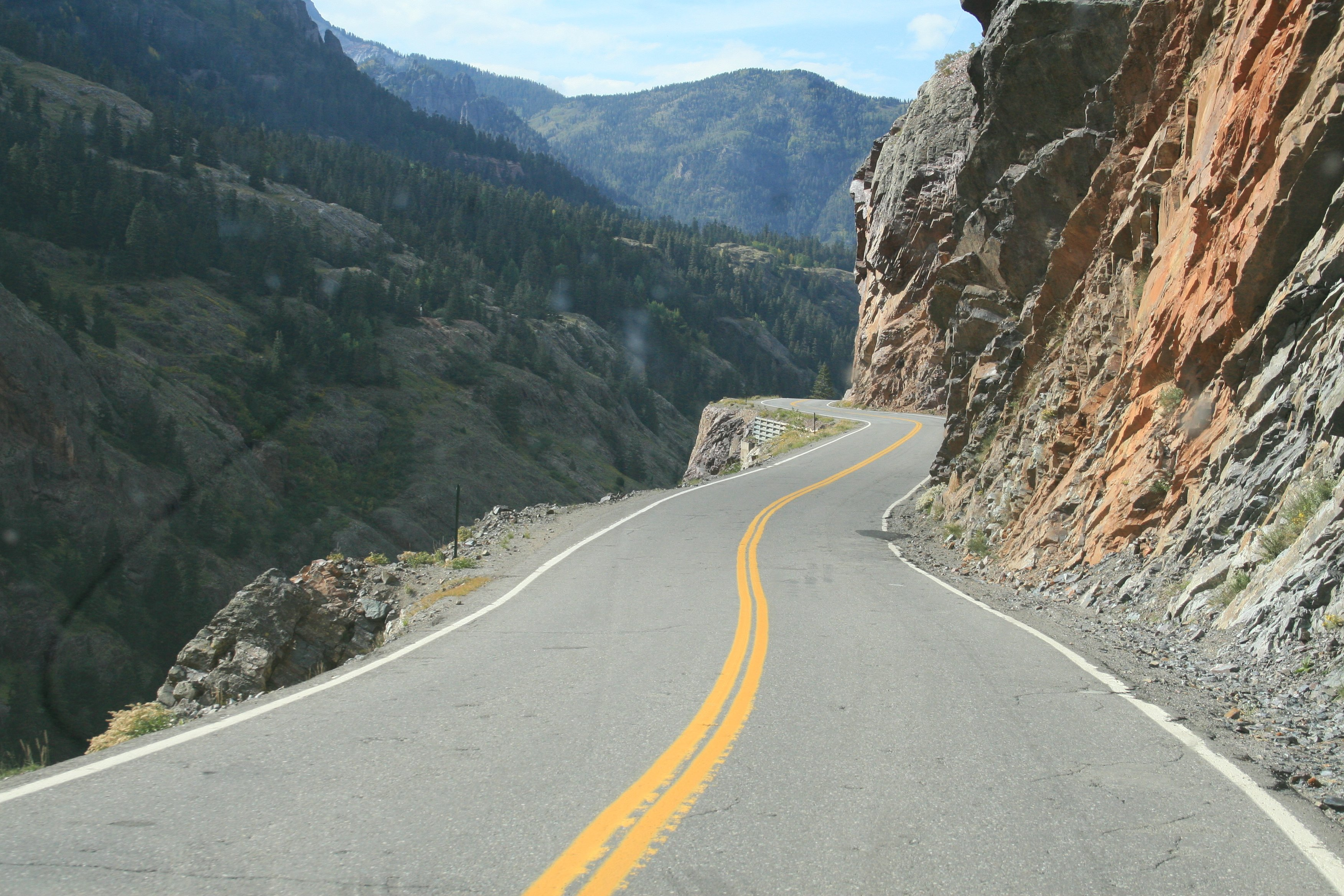
The Million Dollar Highway along the Uncompahgre Gorge, just south of Ouray, Colorado

== Wilderness areas ==
There are three officially designated wilderness areas lying within Uncompahgre National Forest that are part of the National Wilderness Preservation System. One of them lies mostly in a neighboring National Forest, while another one extends onto land that is managed by the Bureau of Land Management (as indicated).

- Lizard Head Wilderness (mostly in San Juan NF)
- Mount Sneffels Wilderness
- Uncompahgre Wilderness (partly on BLM land)

== See also ==
- List of national forests of the United States
- Grand Mesa Scenic and Historic Byway
