= Uncompahgre Wilderness =

Protected area in southwestern Colorado, US

- IUCN category Ib (wilderness area)
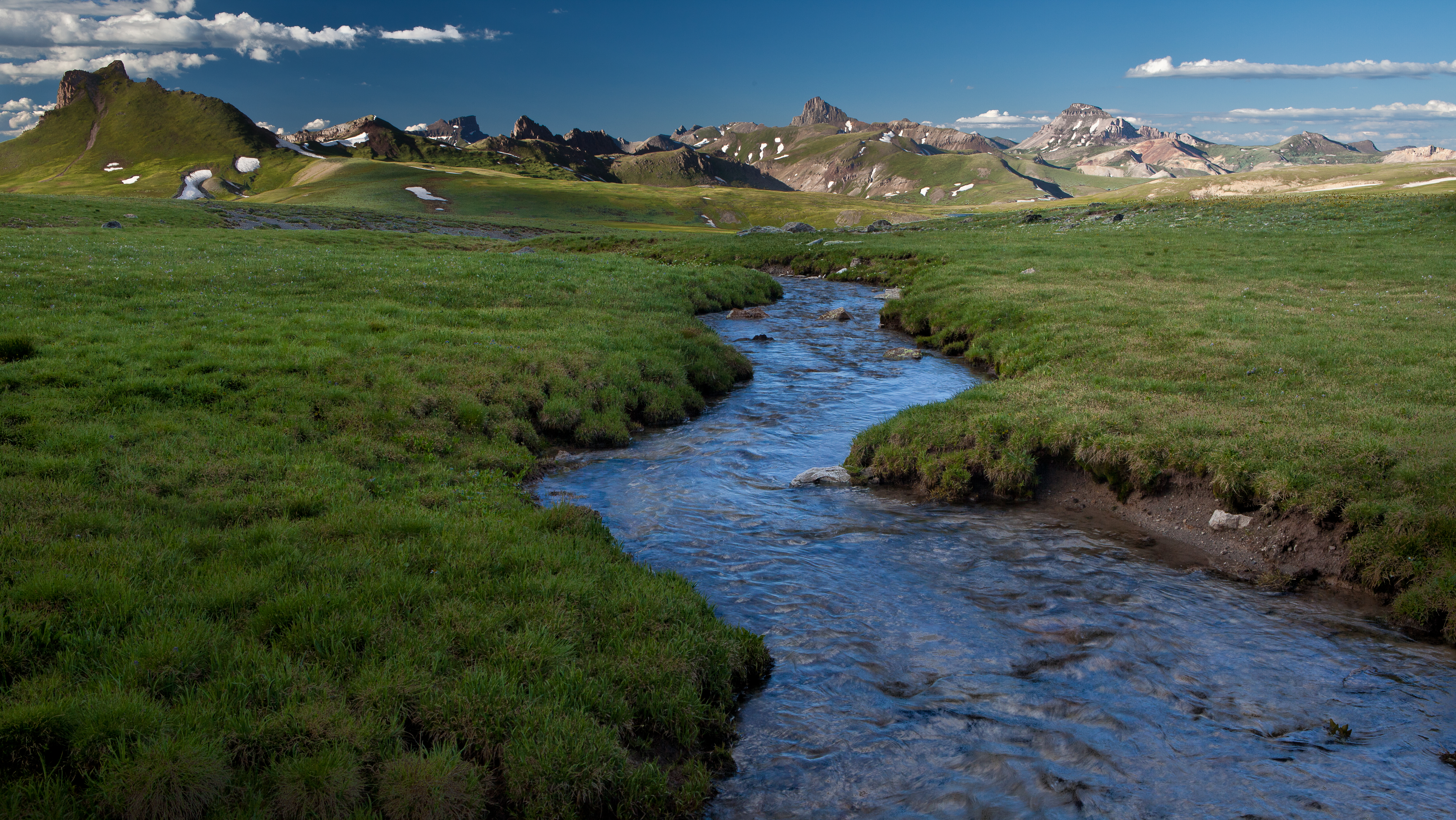

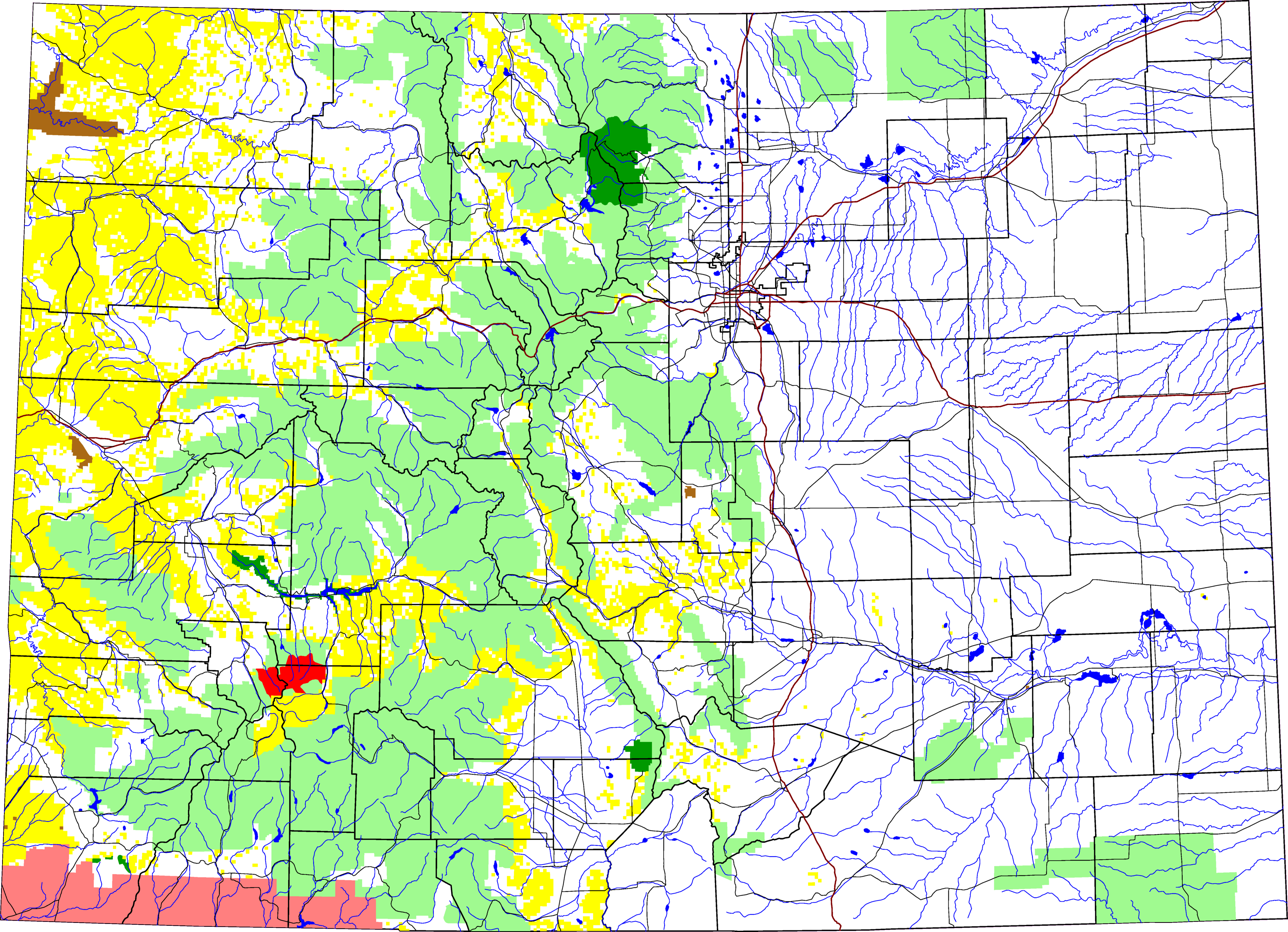
- Location within Colorado (red)
- Location: Hinsdale / Ouray / Gunnison counties, Colorado, USA
- Nearest city: Grand Junction, CO
- Coordinates: 38°6′16″N 107°28′42″W
- Area: 102,721 acres (415.70 km^{2})
- Established: January 1, 1980
- Governing body: U.S. Forest Service; U.S. Bureau of Land Management

The Uncompahgre Wilderness (Note: Pronounced /ʌnkʌmˈpɑːɡreɪ/.) (formerly called the Big Blue Wilderness) is a U.S. Wilderness Area in southwest Colorado comprising 102,721 acres (415.70 km^{2}). Elevation in the Wilderness ranges from 8,400 feet (2,600 m) to 14,309 feet (4,361 m), at the summit of Uncompahgre Peak.

Managed by the Uncompahgre National Forest, it is located approximately 5 miles (8.0 km) northwest of the town of Lake City and some 10 miles (16 km) east of the town of Ouray.

The area is named for Uncompahgre Peak, which at 14,309 feet (4,361 m) is the highest peak in the San Juan Mountains. The Wilderness includes one other prominent fourteener, Wetterhorn Peak at 14,015 feet (4,272 m).

== Mining claim ==
Located within the Uncompahgre Wilderness is the Robin Redbreast Gold Mine, owned by Robert and Marjorie Miller of Montrose, Colorado. Marjorie Miller's father staked the claims in 1938, more than 50 years before the land was designated Wilderness, and was preserved by the General Mining Act of 1872. The Forest Service has established requirements that would lessen mining impacts, such as reducing motorized vehicle use and night lighting. The Millers say workers will use picks and shovels to extract ore, haul it out with mule teams over existing trails, and use helicopters to deliver larger equipment to avoid the impacts of truck use. Environmental groups have expressed concern that Acid Rock Drainage and the human footprint created by mining activities will degrade the Wilderness.
