= Cimarron River (Gunnison River tributary) =

River in Colorado, United States

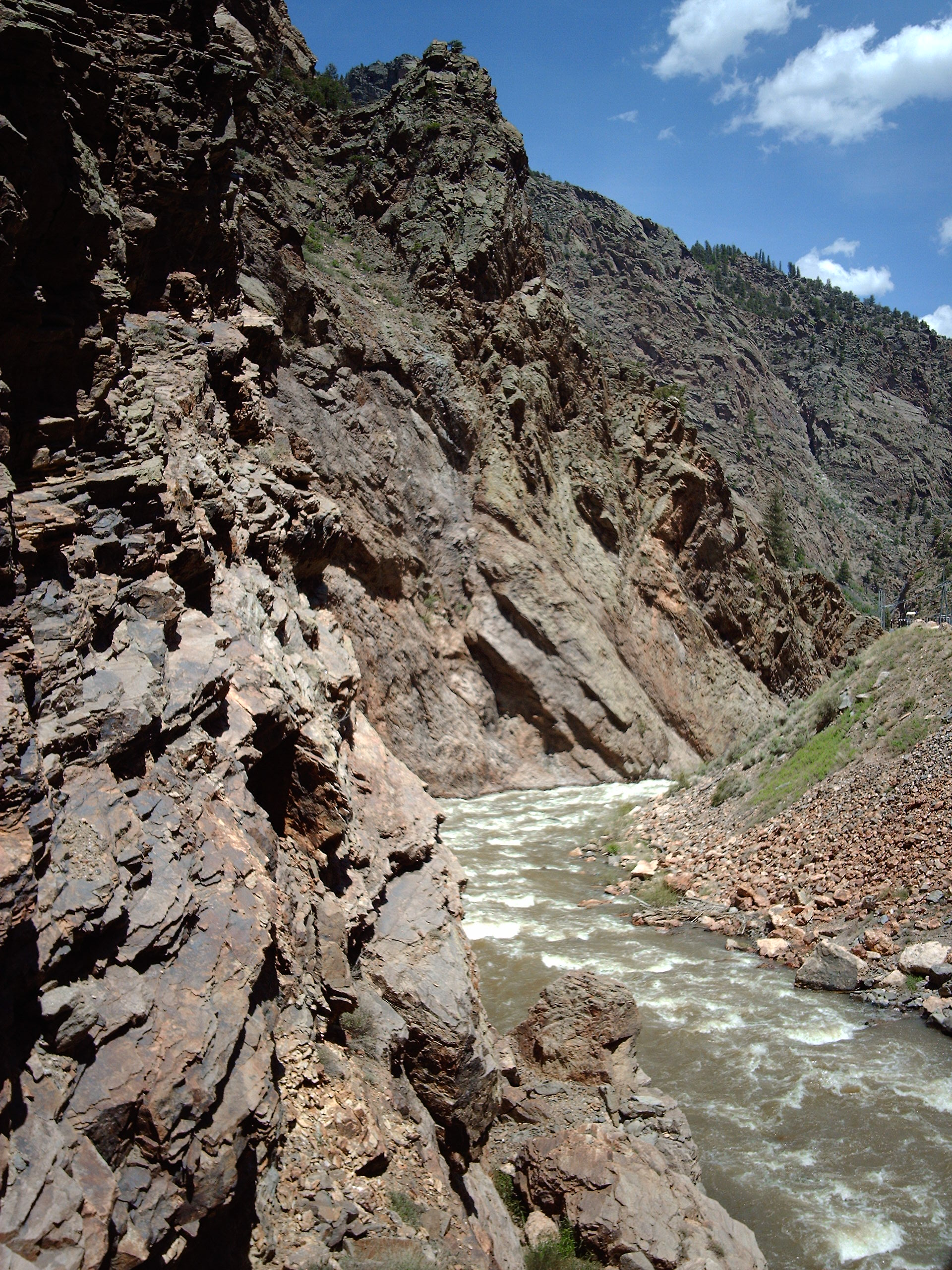
- Cimarron River Gorge

Physical characteristics
- Source
  - location: Confluence of East Fork and Middle Fork
  - coordinates: 38°12′15″N 107°31′11″W
  - elevation: 9,022 ft (2,750 m)
- Mouth
  - location: Confluence with Gunnison River
  - coordinates: 38°27′11″N 107°32′38″W
  - elevation: 6,755 ft (2,059 m)

Basin features
- Progression: Gunnison—Colorado

The Cimarron River is a 22.0-mile-long (35.4 km) tributary that joins the Gunnison River in Curecanti National Recreation Area near Cimarron, Colorado. The river's source is the confluence of two forks near Silver Jack Reservoir in the Uncompahgre National Forest.

The Cimarron is fed by the West, Middle, and East forks of the river, respectively.

A Denver & Rio Grande Western narrow gauge trestle is located near the confluence of the Cimarron and the Gunnison.

== See also ==
- List of rivers of Colorado
- List of tributaries of the Colorado River
