= 2026 Colorado wildfires =

Series of wildfires

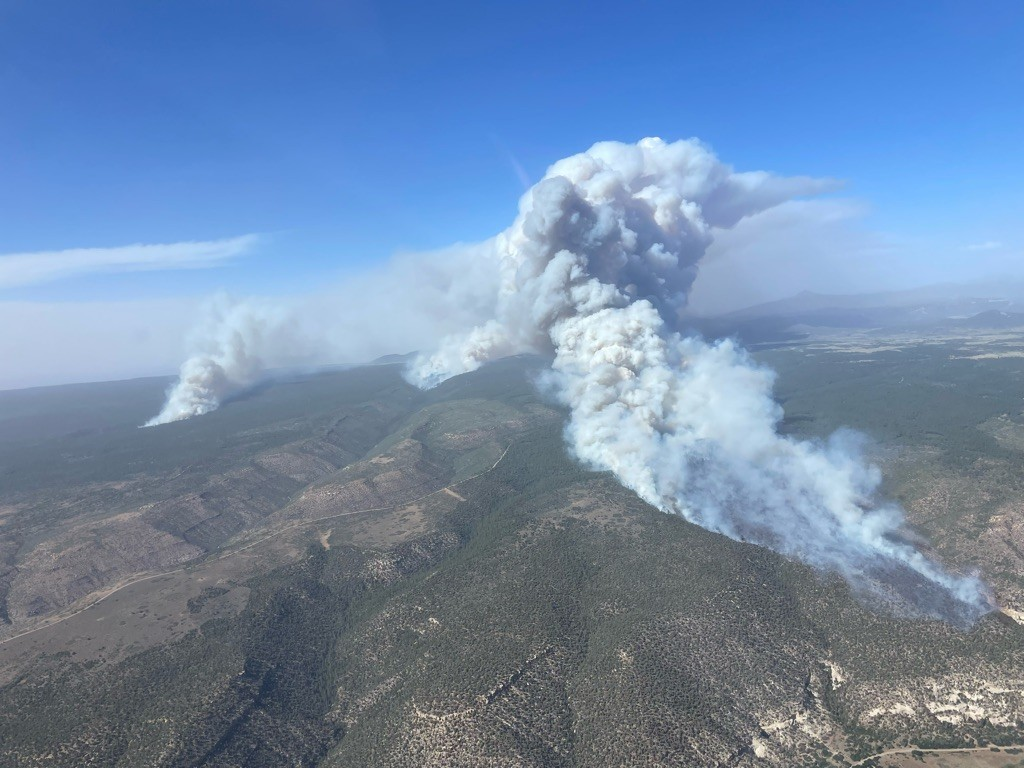
- Aerial view of the Ferris Fire on June 28

Statistics
- Burned area: ~235,000 acres

Impacts
- Deaths: 3
- Injuries: 2
- Structures destroyed: 850

The 2026 Colorado wildfire season has included a significant number of wildfires in Colorado.

== Background ==
While "fire season" varies every year in Colorado, most wildfires occur in between May and September. However, there is an increasing fire danger in winter months. Fire conditions can be exacerbated by drought, strong winds, and vegetation growth. Climate change is leading to increased temperatures, lower humidity levels, and drought conditions are happening more often. Additionally, warmer temperatures and less precipitation can result in less snowmelt, further contributing to bad wildfire conditions.

Colorado had one of its lowest snowpacks on record during the 2025-26 North American winter due to warm and dry conditions, particularly in the western part of the state. These conditions left Colorado more vulnerable to wildfires then usual.

During June 2026, multiple major wildfires sparked across the southern half of the state a few days after wildfires in Utah exploded in size and intensity, with the Aspen Acres Fire growing to be the largest in the state, and more favorable weather conditions have damage assessments ongoing across the area.

== List of wildfires ==
The following is a list of fires that burned more than 1,000 acres (400 ha), produced significant structural damage, or resulted in casualties.

| Name | County | Acres | Start date | Containment date | Notes | Ref. |
|---|---|---|---|---|---|---|
| County Road 89 | Morgan, Weld | 1,092 | February 17 | February 17 | | |
| County Road 169 Highway 24 | Elbert, Lincoln | 5,599 | February 17 | February 18 | | |
| Dahlberg | Douglas | 1,081 | February 24 | February 24 | | |
| 113 | Logan | 5,126 | February 25 | February 25 | | |
| Range 121 | El Paso | 1,100 | March 15 | March 16 | | |
| Nineteen | El Paso | 1,600 | March 18 | March 19 | | |
| 24 | Pueblo, Fremont, El Paso | 7,405 | March 18 | April 2 | Closed and prompted several evacuations near State Highway 115 for multiple days. | |
| Schwachheim | Las Animas | 1,582 | April 12 | April 24 | Burned southeast of Trinidad. | |
| Highway 36 | Yuma | 1,000 | April 13 | April 13 | Closed Highway 36. | |
| Hammer | El Paso | 4,958 | April 22 | April 24 | Prompted evacuations for Hanover and closed schools in Hanover School District 28. | |
| Poitrey Canyon | Las Animas | 2,113 | April 24 | May 3 | Human-caused. Burned 45 miles (72 km) south of La Junta. | |
| Ferris | Montezuma, Dolores | 64,881 | June 27 | August 6 | Merged with Far Draw and Doe Canyon fires on June 28. Prompting evacuations for campgrounds northeast of Pleasant View over a time frame of several days. | |
| Snyder | Mesa, Grand (UT) | 28,264 | June 27 | July 17 | Knowles Fire kills four helitack firefighters. The Knowles Fire soon merged with the Jones, Snyder Mesa, and Gore fires in Utah to form the combined Snyder Fire | |
| Gold Mountain | Ouray | 39,718 | June 27 | 87% | Burning 1.3 miles north of Ouray along U.S. Route 550, forced numerous evacuations as it grew to the north. Pilot Nicholas Dale dies on July 12 as his Kaman K-1200 helicopter crashes into Silver Jack Reservoir while fighting wildfire. | |
| Willow | Lake | 7,533 | June 28 | 80% | Burning below Mount Massive, forced evacuations west of Leadville. | |
| Aspen Acres | Custer, Pueblo, Huerfano | 102,004 | June 29 | 82% | Burned across State Highway 78, threatening Colorado City, Beulah, and structures in several other evacuation zones, including in Fremont County. Destroyed over 850 structures including 319 homes. | |
| Sheep Head | Huerfano | 1,322 | June 29 | July 5 | Burned west of Sheep Mountain. Prompting pre-evacuations near State Highway 69 and Farisita. | |
| Elk | Gunnison | 7,257 | July 9 | 73% | Lightning–caused. Burning 6.5 miles (10.5 km) north of Lake City and prompting evacuations. | |
| P-L Gulch | Rio Blanco | 1,580 | July 13 | July 25 | Human-caused. Burned 20 miles (32 km) southwest of Meeker and prompted evacuations. | |
| Big Gulch | Moffat | 1,055 | July 19 | July 25 | Unknown cause. Burned northwest of Craig and causing power outages. | |
| Keystone | Moffat, Rio Blanco | 3,042 | July 21 | July 28 | Lightning-caused. Burned 20 miles (32 km) northwest of Meeker. | |
| Fuhr Gulch | Moffat | 1,650 | July 21 | July 30 | Lightning-caused. Burning in Craig. Destroyed two structures. | |
| Mt. Carmel | Baca | 2,000 | July 23 | July 25 | Burned in Campo. Forward progress stopped on July 24. | |
| Rio Blanco | Archuleta | 1,388 | July 28 | August 18 | Lightning-caused. Burned south of Pagosa Springs and prompting evacuations. | |
| Post | Las Animas | 4,343 | August 11 | 90% | Lightning-caused. Burning in Fishers Peak State Park and closing all trails in the park. | |

== See also ==
- 2026 Utah wildfires
- 2026 Arizona Wildfires
- 2026 Idaho Wildfires
- List Of Colorado Wildfires
