= Helitack =

Helicopter used to transport firefighters to fire zones

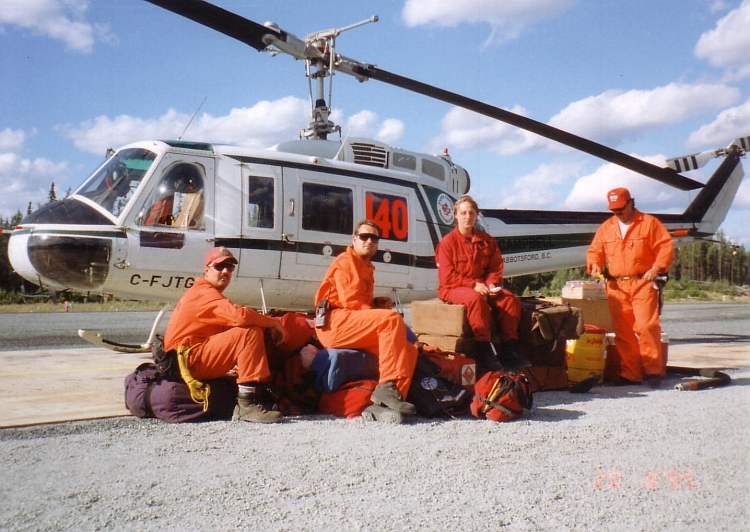
Helitack crew on standby with the Ontario Ministry of Natural Resources, Sioux Lookout, 1995

Helitack crews are teams of wildland firefighters who are transported by helicopter to wildfires. Helicopters provide rapid transport, enabling helitack crews to quickly respond and assess a wildfire situation. Helitack crews may land near a wildfire or, if equipped and trained, rappel from a hovering helicopter. Once on the ground, crews build firelines using hand tools, chainsaws, and other firefighting tools. They often remain overnight in remote locations. After they have completed their assignment, crew members may pack up to 120 pounds of equipment over difficult terrain to reach a pick-up point. Rappellers often prepare helispots (helicopter landing zones) that provide better access to a fire. Helicopter crew members may also perform other duties such as tree falling, firing operations, and managing helibases.

== Terminology ==
=== Helitack ===
The term helitack first appeared in a 1956 Los Angeles Times article, which described the "first of a series of tests—tabbed the Helitack Program—on the use of helicopters in firefighting will start next week in the San Bernardino National Forest". The word itself is a portmanteau of "helicopter" and "attack".

=== Helibase ===
The incident helibase is the location from which incident helicopter support missions are flown, and where the helicopters assigned to that base are parked, serviced, and refueled. Usually a helibase is in a field location that is close enough to the Incident Base Camp so that supplies and personnel can be ferried by ground to the helibase from the camp in a timely manner. More remote helibases (i.e., nearer the fire) can be established to maximize efficiency and reduce flight costs. Occasionally, helibases are located at a nearby airport or backcountry airstrip. The name of the base is designated by the name of the incident, though on large fires there can be multiple helibases. Helibases are staffed with a Helibase Manager, Deck Coordinator, Landing and Takeoff Coordinator, Aircraft Base Radio Operator, and numerous subsidiary positions operating in a Helibase Operations trailer or out on the landing pads. Crash rescue capability is usually assigned to the larger helibases. An "H" in a circle designates a helibase on an incident map.

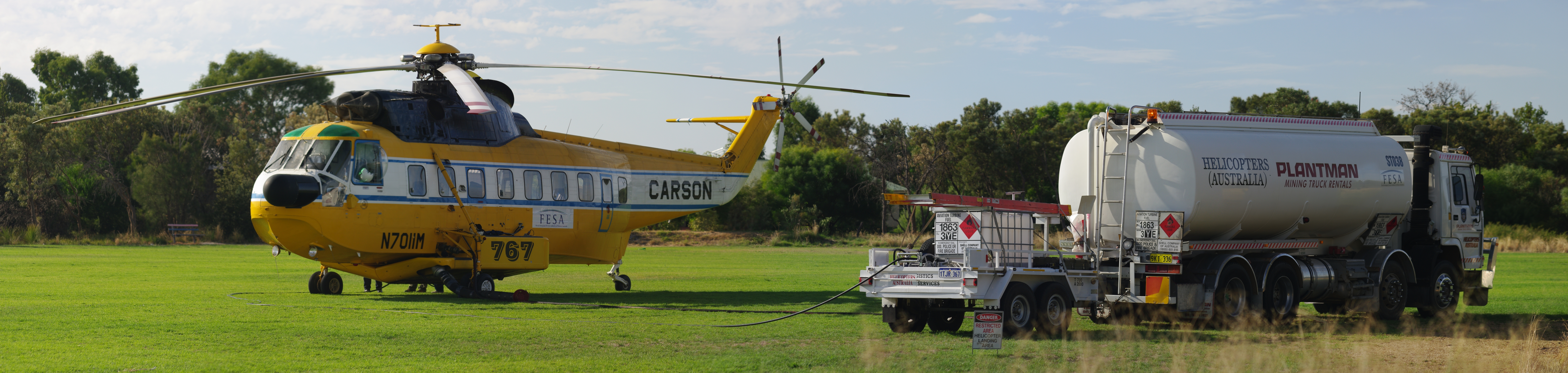
A Carson Helicopters S-61N Fire King being fueled during firefighting operations in Southern River, Western Australia

=== Helispot ===
"Helispot" is an American term for a location near a fire where it is safe for helicopters to land and take off. At this designated location, a helispot manager and usually a few helitack crewmembers will be onsite to coordinate landings and take-offs as well as the manifesting, loading and unloading of equipment and personnel. Helispots are temporarily located as the incident grows and can be found on ridges, meadows, parking lots – in short, any clearing suitable and meeting rotor clearance and hazard (wires, trees, etc.) avoidance requirements. Helispots are found on the incident map by filled in circles with the letters H-# next to it, the # designating what number it is. Helispots are approved by a pilot and a qualified helicopter manager before being used.

=== Drop point ===
A helicopter drop point, or drop point is similar to a helispot, but used for depositing, often via longline, and caching supplies. Helicopters and supply vehicles use the drop point to off-load supplies at the edge of an incident for the ground teams to come by and pick up. Drop points may be located all around the fire. Wildland firefighters will usually pick up sharpened tools, pumps and hoses, water, food, radio batteries, etc. at the drop points. On an incident map, the symbol for a drop point is a filled dot with the letters D-# next to them with the # designating which number is it.

== Methodology ==
A helitack helicopter will launch with a crew on board, drop them in the vicinity of the fire (or "incident") where they will begin clearing a firebreak with standard hand tools, while the helicopter can then support the team with water drops, either with a helicopter bucket or airframe-mounted water tanks, or ferry in additional personnel (e.g., hotshot crews). If the fire continues to grow beyond the initial attack phase, the mission of the helitack crew shifts to a support role, locating and operating at helispots and helibases, where the coordination of the support required for other firefighting helicopters.

In a situation where terrain or vegetation height make it impossible for a helicopter to land, helitack methodology can also employ rappellers, rappelling from a helicopter as high as 250 feet above the ground or deplaning crews from a hovering helicopter (heli-jumping).

When backfires or "prescribed burns" are needed in remote areas, helitack helicopters can be used to start them, using a "helitorch", a driptorch suspended on a cable under the helicopter, or by dropping plastic sphere dispenser (PSD) ignition devices.

In the event that a firefighter on the ground is injured, the helitack helicopter is used to evacuate the victim to a medical facility.

== History ==
Helicopters were used in combating wildfires in California as early as 1947 and their usefulness at moving personnel rapidly around a fire was quickly recognized. Initially, helicopters were just used for tactical and logistical support for ground crews.

In 1957 the Los Angeles County Fire Department experimentally used a Bell 47 to lay hoses using belly mounted trays.

The first water bucket was probably developed by Jim Grady of Okanagan Helicopters working with Henry Stevenson, who owned a machine shop in Nelson, British Columbia. Development began in the mid-1950s and the "Monsoon Bucket" was operational in 1962. The bucket was a converted 45-imperial-gallon (205 L) drum with a trap door in the bottom that was actuated by the pilot in flight.

In the early 1960s the California Division of Forestry (now known as CALFIRE) began water bucketing trials. Testing was also done on a 105-U.S.-gallon (400 L) water tank mounted on a Bell 47. US federal agencies, such as the BLM and the USFS also began contracting commercial helicopter services to assist in fighting wildfires on lands they were responsible for in the early 1960s.

The California Department of Forestry began experimenting with helitack as a doctrinal concept in 1960, when a crew of three firefighters was deployed on an Alouette III helicopter.

== Crews ==
Crew sizes vary from base to base and agency to agency.

Helitack crews are often considered to be elite members of the firefighting community, partly because of the experience levels required to qualify as a crew member. CDF Captain Jim Barthol, in an interview with the San Diego Union-Tribune, used the analogy of runners in a race to compare helitack with other handcrews. He said that "ground-based hand crews are marathon runners, while helitack crews work more like sprinters. Other hand crews might spend three days or more fighting a fire, we might work three different incidents in one day. It doesn't necessarily make us better than those other guys. It just makes us different."

Much of the helitack crews' training centers on helicopter safety, as the crews typically load and unload with the rotors turning, and sometimes in very rough terrain, where only the skid on one side can be touched down.

The minimum recommended physical fitness standards for helitack-rappelers set by the National Wildfire Coordinating Group are: packout 85 pounds for 3 miles within 90 minutes, run 1 1/2-miles in 10:30 or less, 25 push-ups in 60 seconds, 45 sit-ups in 60 seconds, and 4 or more pull-ups.

== Equipment ==
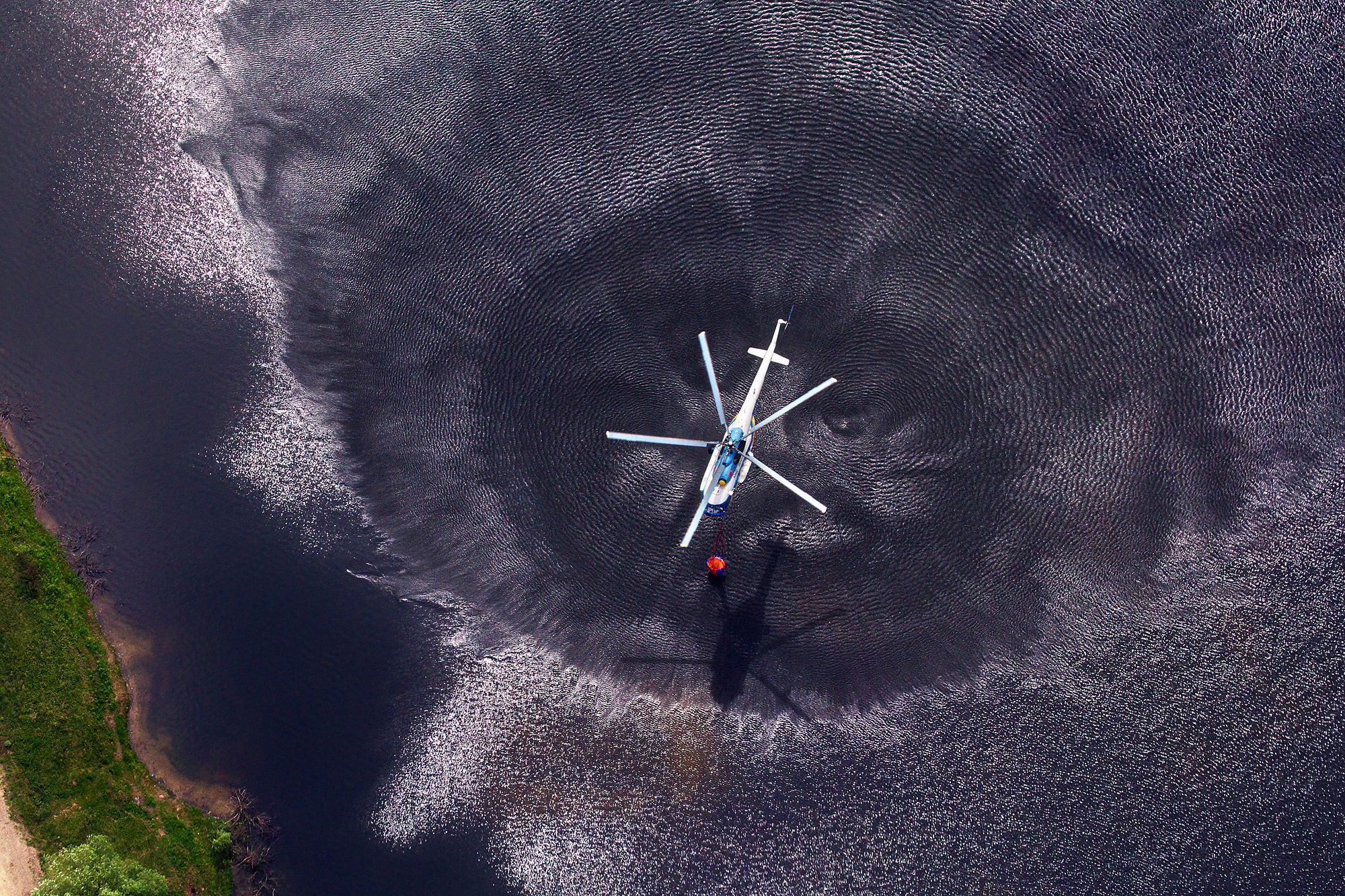
State Emergency Service of Ukraine (MChS) Mil Mi-8MTV picking up water near Nezhin

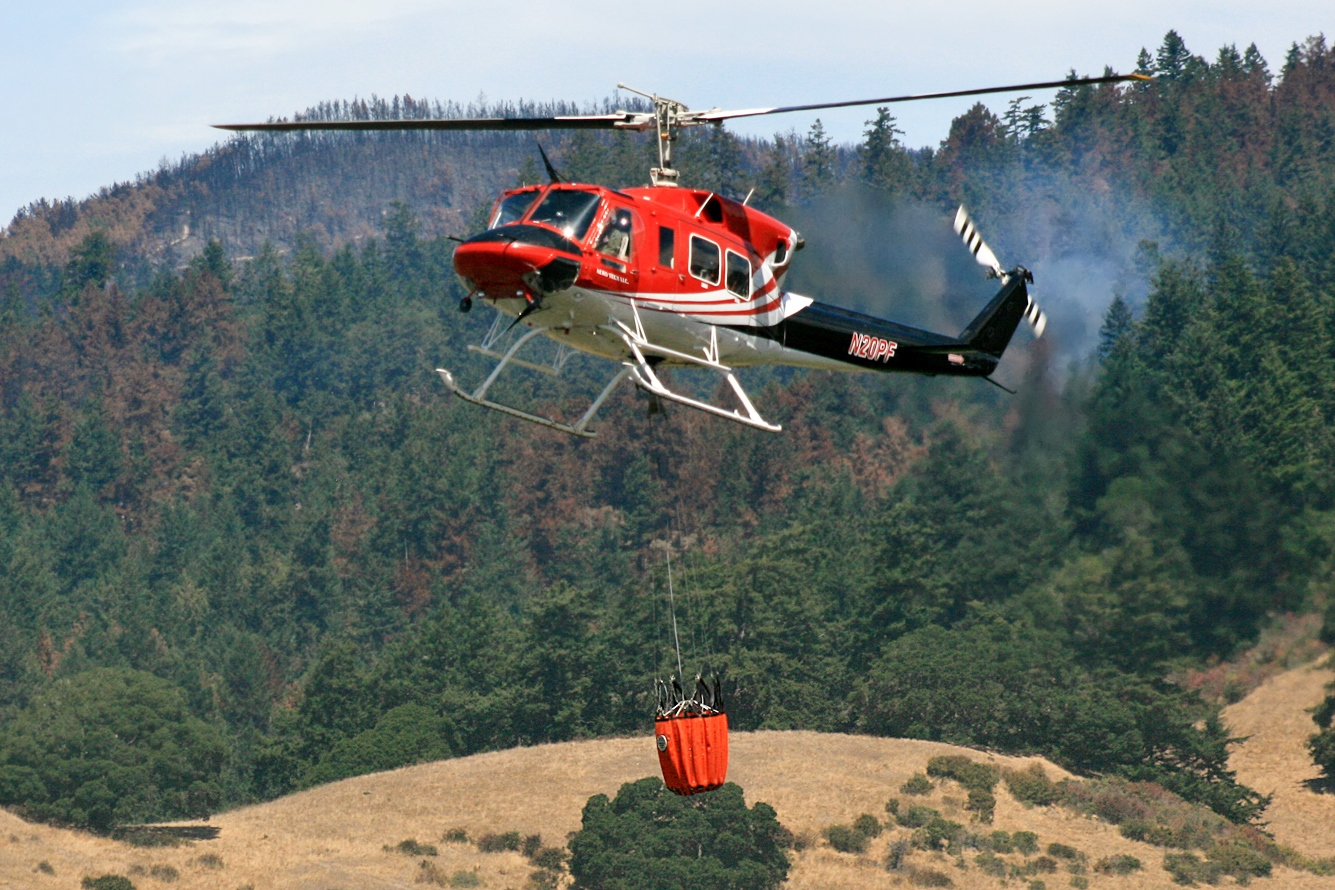
A Bell 212 with a helicopter bucket

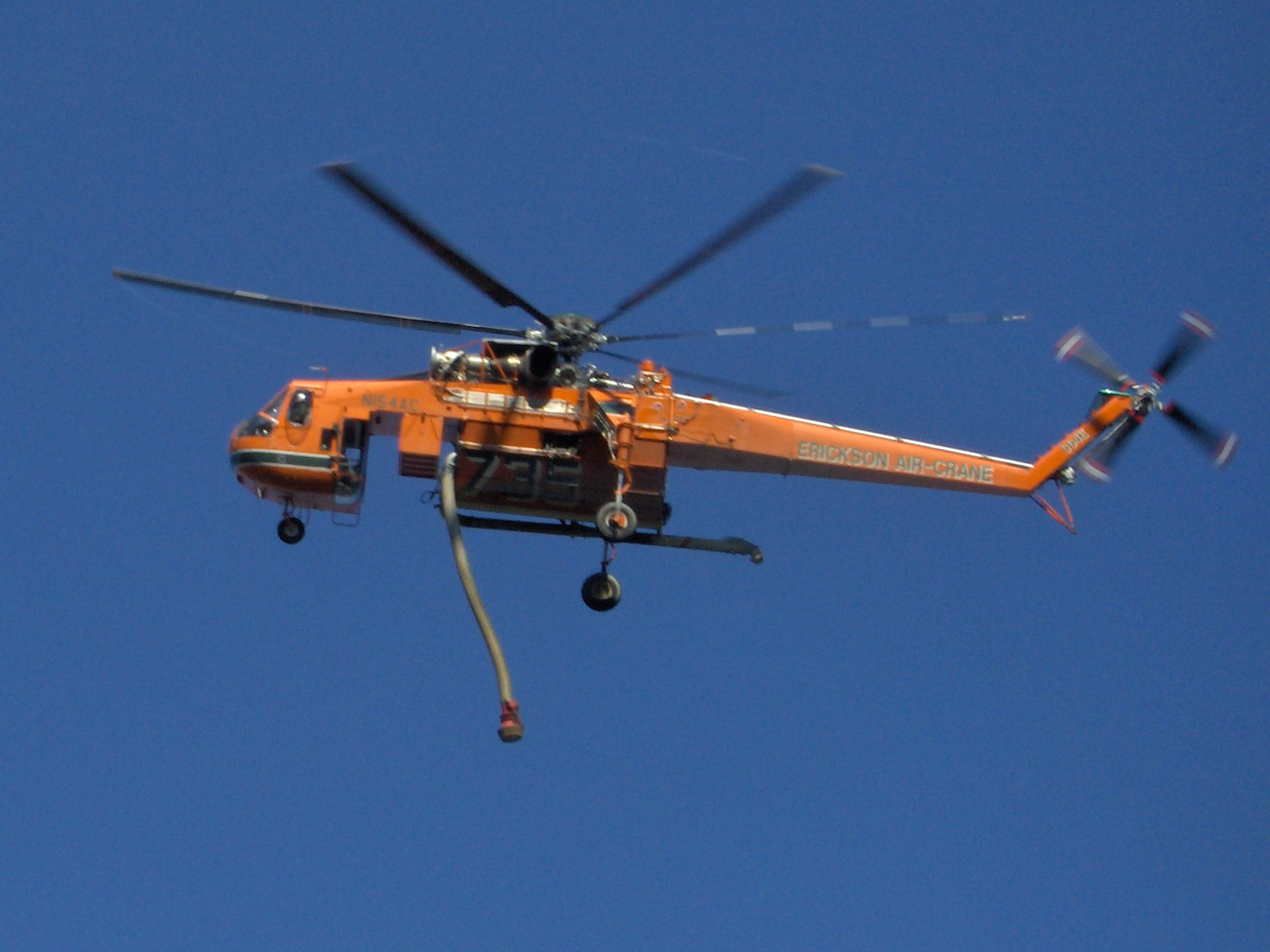
S-64 Skycrane

Helicopters used for helitack missions are usually utility helicopters, selected for both their lifting capability as well as their large cabin size to accommodate the helitack crew.

Some of the most common helicopter types are variants of the venerable UH-1 Huey, known in the civilian world as the Bell 205, especially upgraded variants such as the 205A++ and the 210. The twin-engine Bell 212 is also popular. Other helicopters such as the Sikorsky S-58 are also used, and the S-70 Firehawk, a civilian version of the military's UH-60 Blackhawk, is now being operated by two agencies in the U.S.

Smaller helicopters, such as the Bell 206 JetRanger and AS350 Astar are sometimes used for precision water drops to protect specific structures, such as cabins or homes.

Larger water dropping helicopters such as the S-64 Skycrane, which can hold as much as 3,000 gallons, rivaling fixed-wing airtankers, are increasingly being used. Only some of these larger rotorcraft have provisions for carrying ground crews, therefore may not always considered "helitack" aircraft in the true sense of the word. Some Type I rotorcraft, such as the Boeing 234, can carry up to 44 passengers in proper configuration.

Water tanks are often permanently or semi-permanently mounted under the helicopter's belly, which can either be filled at a helispot via a hose from a fire engine, or with a "snorkel", a long hose with a water pump in its end that can suck water out of a lake or small tank set up by fire crews.

The helitack crews use the same tools on the fire lines as other ground crews do, including chain saws, axes, shovels and a specialized, two-headed cutting tool known as a Pulaski.

=== US classification system ===
In the U.S., helitack helicopters are designated by "type", as defined by the Interagency Helicopter Operations Guide, based on their capacities:

Type	I	II	III
Allowable payload, standard conditions	5,000 lb	2,500 lb	1,200 lb
Passenger seats	15+	9–14	4–8
Water/retardant	700 U.S. gallons	300 U.S. gallons	100 U.S. gallons
Max takeoff/landing weights	12,501+ lb	6,000–12,500 lb	less than 6,000 lb

=== Canadian classification system ===
Since forest protection is a provincial responsibility in Canada each province has its own system for classifying helicopters for contract use, setting equipment standards and for employing them.

A typical system is the one that was in use by Manitoba in 1996. The then-named Manitoba Department of Natural Resources established a stand-by system for all aircraft contracted for forest fire protection missions. This consisted of five levels of readiness, depending on the fire forecast and the time of day:

- Red Alert: Crews are at the base with the aircraft serviced, fueled and ready for immediate dispatch.
- Yellow Alert: Crews can be contacted and be at the base within fifteen minutes. The aircraft is fuelled. Minor aircraft servicing is permitted. The aircraft must be airborne within 30 minutes of receiving the dispatch call.
- Blue 1: The crews can be contacted and the aircraft can be airborne within one hour of receiving a dispatch call. Routine servicing and maintenance of the aircraft are permitted.
- Blue 2: The crews can be contacted and the aircraft airborne within two hours of receiving a dispatch call. Routine servicing and maintenance of the aircraft are permitted.
- Green: Stand-down.

At that time the Manitoba Department of Natural Resources classified contract helicopters in two classifications:

- Medium Lift Helicopter
- Light Lift Helicopter

The province also sets equipment standards for these contract helicopters, which are similar to others used across Canada:

==== Medium-lift helicopter ====
- VHF-AM Radio Communication Transceiver (118–136 MHz).
- VHF-FM "hi band" radio able to operate on the Department of Natural Resources' assigned frequencies (160–165 MHz) with dual tone multi-frequency encoding capability.
- Crew intercom with four headsets and air to ground communications capability on VHF-AM and FM from at least both front seat locations.
- Cargo hook
- Two 12-foot × 12-foot nets
- Two lanyards
- One barrel net.
- 320-imperial-gallon (1,450 L) capacity collapsible water bucket with foam injection capability.
- Skid landing gear with bear paws.
- Portable refuelling pump.
- Global Positioning System

==== Light-lift helicopter ====
- VHF-AM Radio Communication Transceiver (118–136 MHz).
- VHF-FM "hi band" radio able to operate on the Department of Natural Resources' assigned frequencies (160–165 MHz) with dual tone multi-frequency encoding capability.
- Two head sets, intercom and air to ground communication.
- Cargo hook
- Two slings or cargo nets.
- Water bucket with instant deployment system.
- High skid gear with bear paws.
- Electrical plug with related 50-ampere circuit breaker suitable for use with Heli-Torch.
- Model MS-3102A-16 Cannon plug with related 10 ampere circuit breaker conveniently located for use with provincial Aga 750 infrared scanning equipment.
- Global Positioning System.

== Incidents ==
- July 6, 1994 - While fighting the South Canyon Fire on Storm King Mountain, near Glenwood Springs, Colorado, two helitack firefighters and 12 other firefighters were killed as they tried to flee the fire after it "spotted" beyond the fireline and began to race up the steep, densely vegetated terrain towards them.
- September 13, 2004 – While fighting a fire in the Stanislaus National Forest in northern California, seven members of a CDF helitack crew were engulfed in the flames when the wind shifted in their direction. The gust lasted for no more than 30 seconds, but one firefighter was killed and several of the survivors were critically burned.
- June 27, 2026 - Five helitack firefighters are caught in a burnover entrapment of the Knowles Fire in Mesa County, Colorado which kills three, and a fourth will later die from burns.
- July 12, 2026 - Pilot Nicholas Dale dies as his Kaman K-1200 helicopter crashes into Silver Jack Reservoir while fighting the Gold Mountain Fire near Ouray, Colorado.

== Images ==
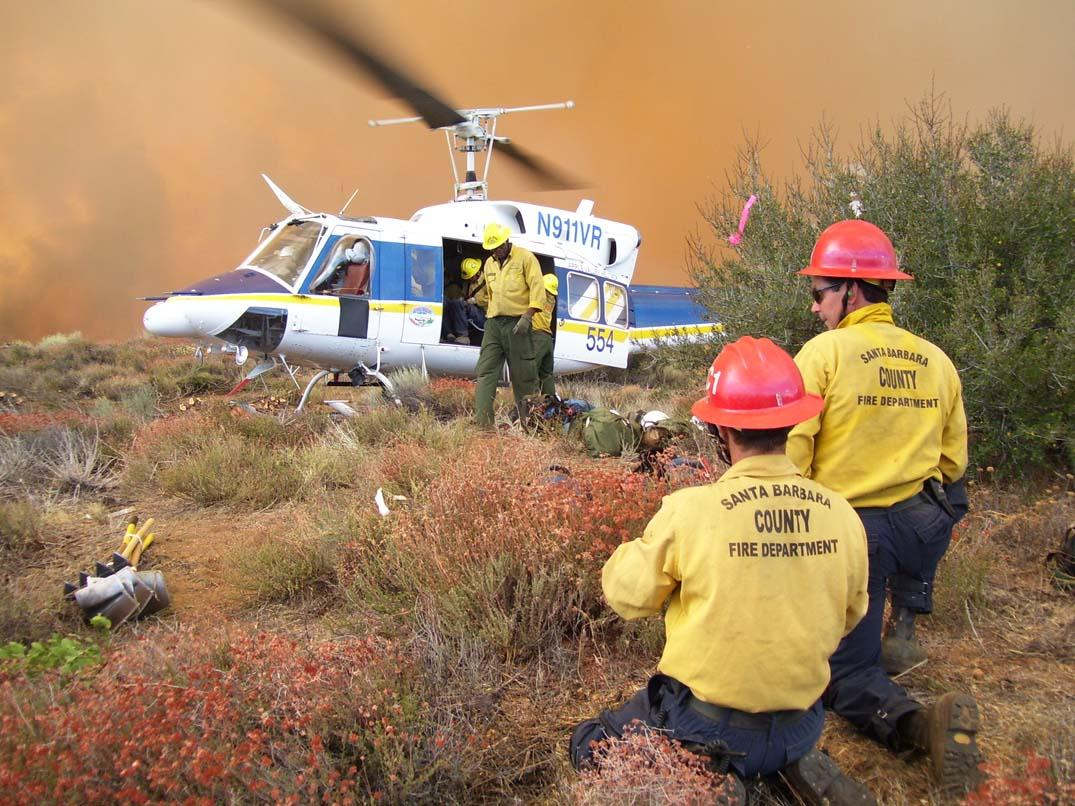
Santa Barbara County hand crew and a Bell 212 on the Day Fire. USFS photo by Jim Akerman

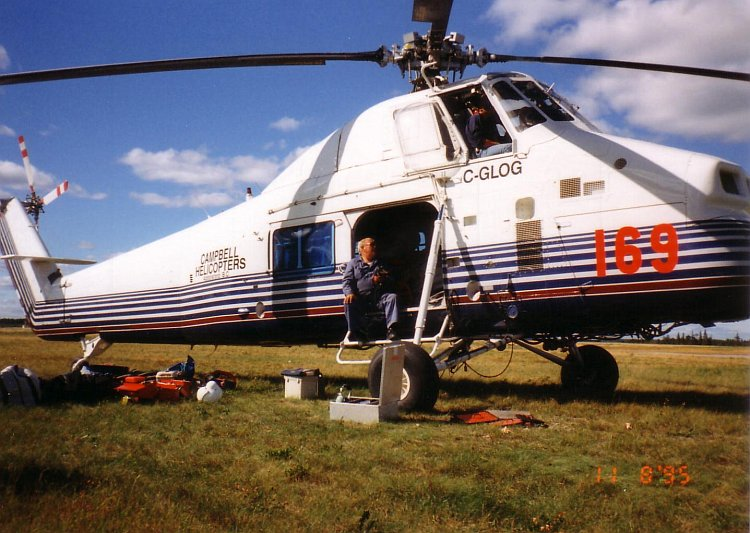
S-58T, callsign Helitack 169, ready to head to a project fire, Dryden, Ontario 1995

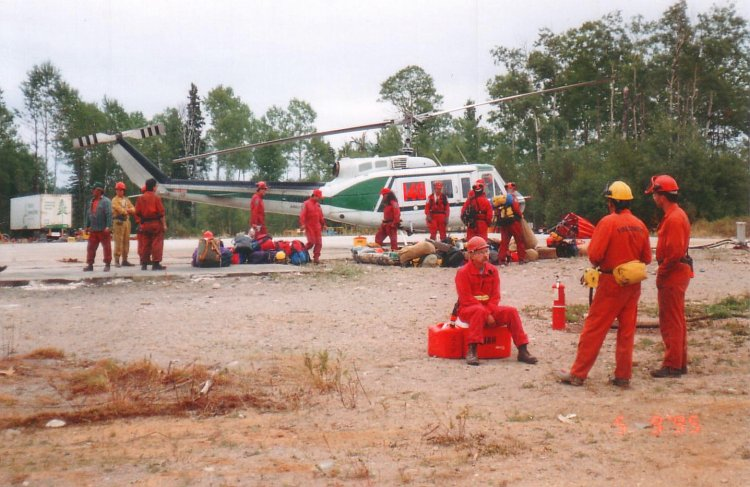
Helitack 140, a Bell 205A-1 and Ontario Ministry of Natural Resources firefighters working on Fire 141 in 1995

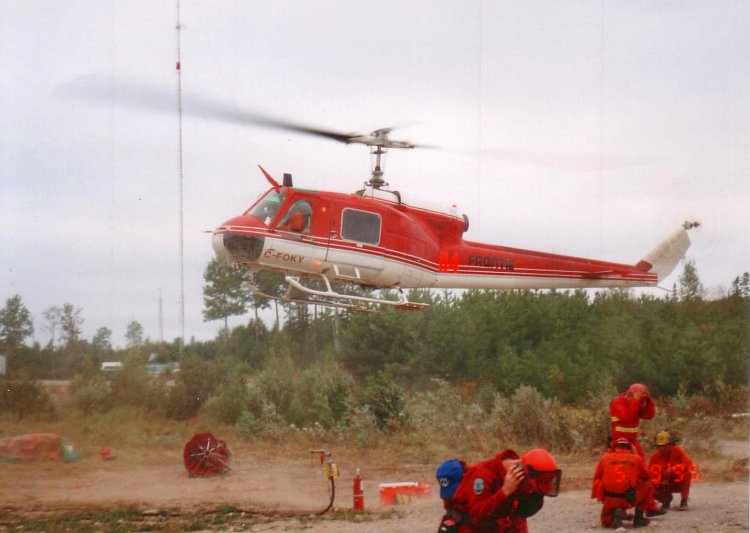
A Bell 204B, callsign Helitack 114 and Ontario Ministry of Natural Resources firefighters working on Fire 141 in 1995

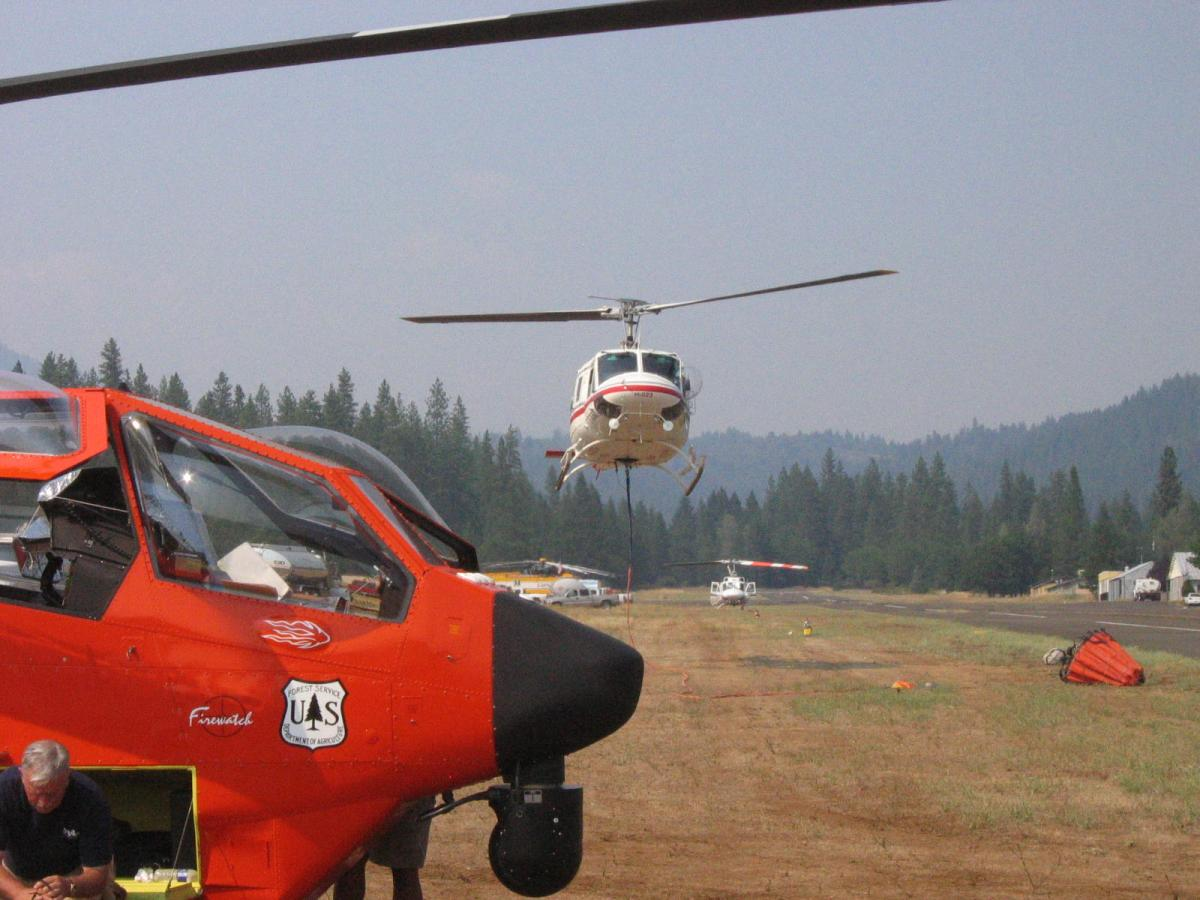
Example of a helibase, this one at Weaverville, California, during the Bar Complex Fire. USFS Bell AH-1 Cobra nose is in the foreground

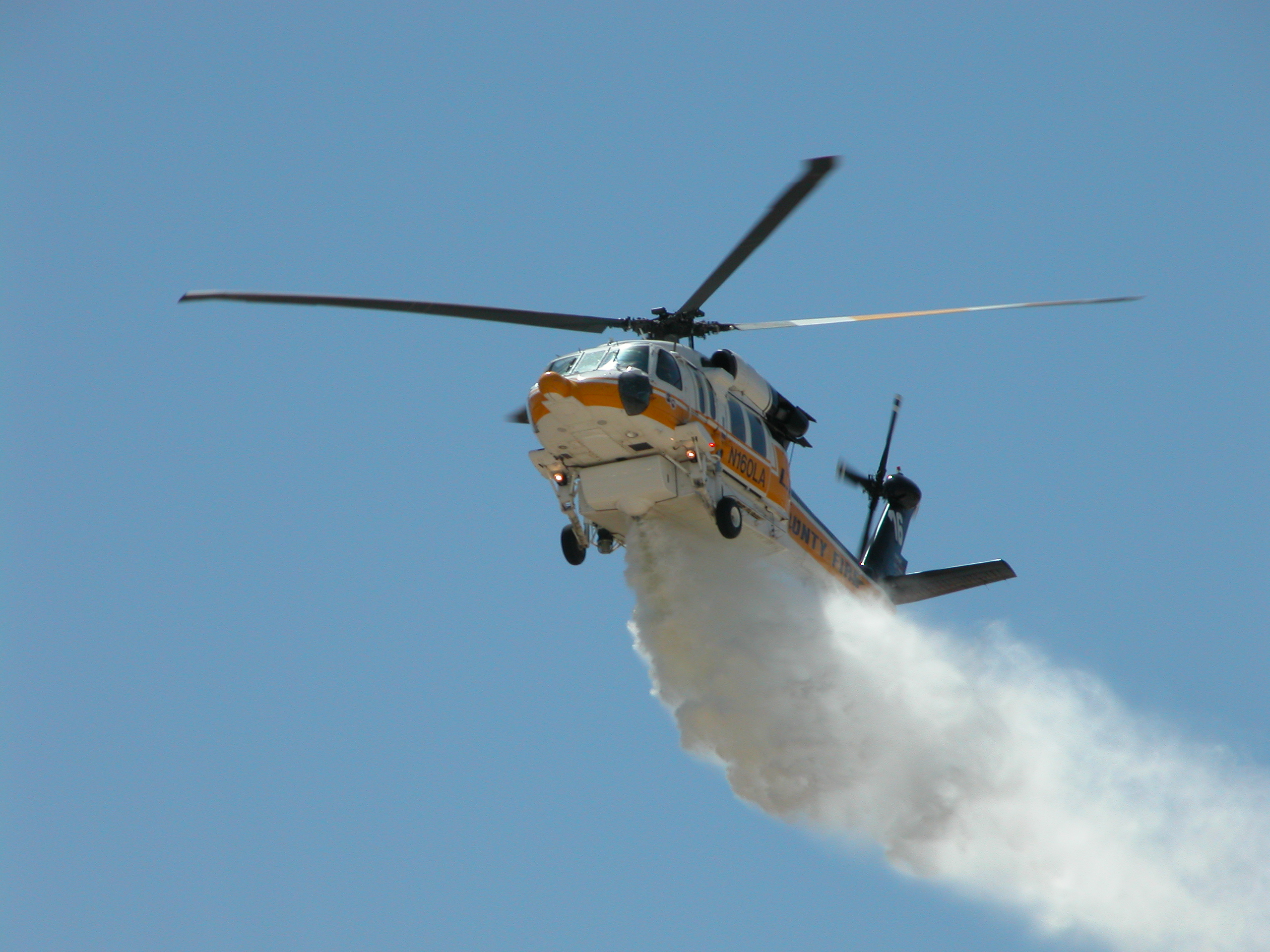
LA County Fire S-70A Firehawk

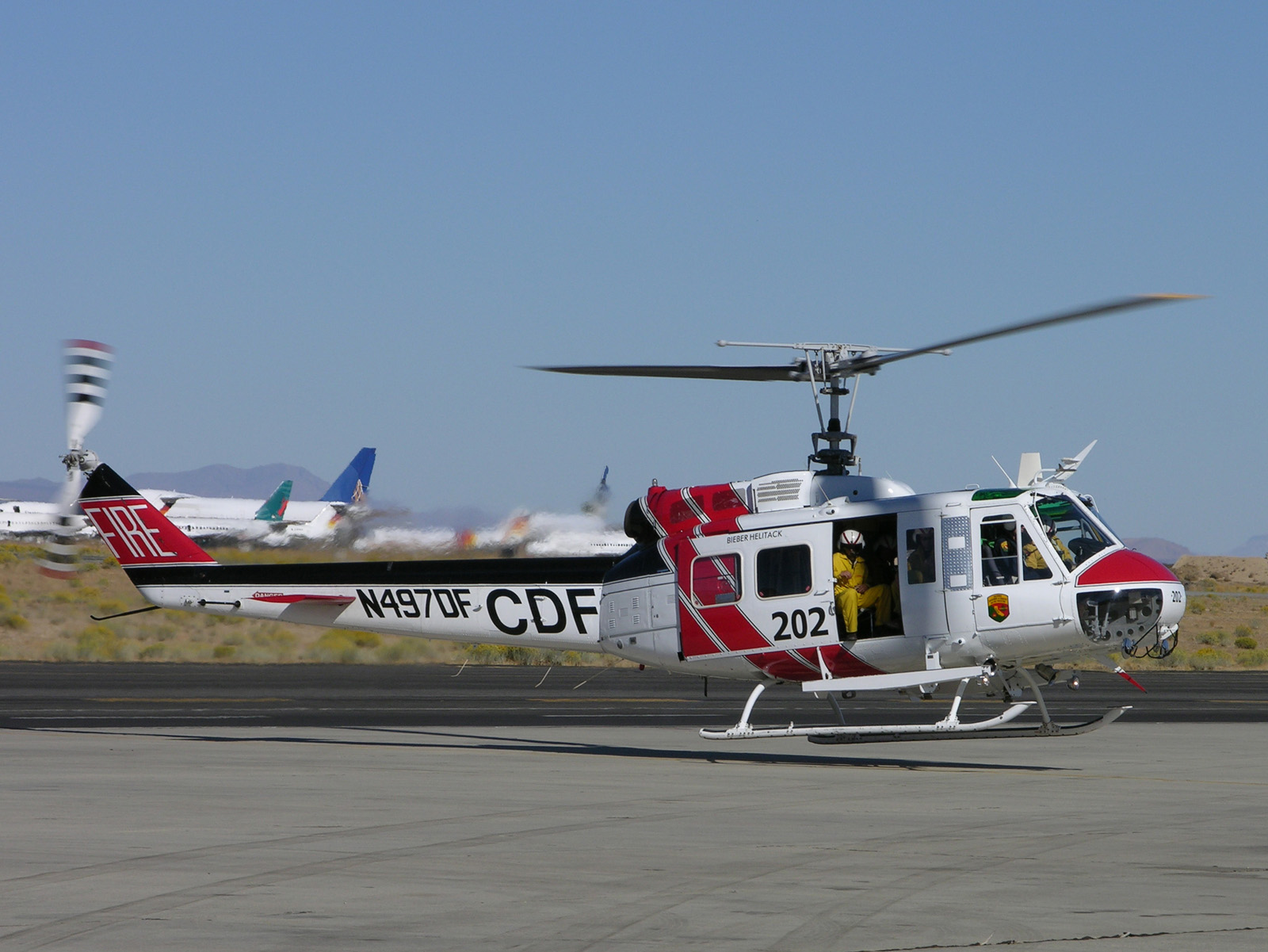
CDF Bell 205 from the Bieber Helitack crew

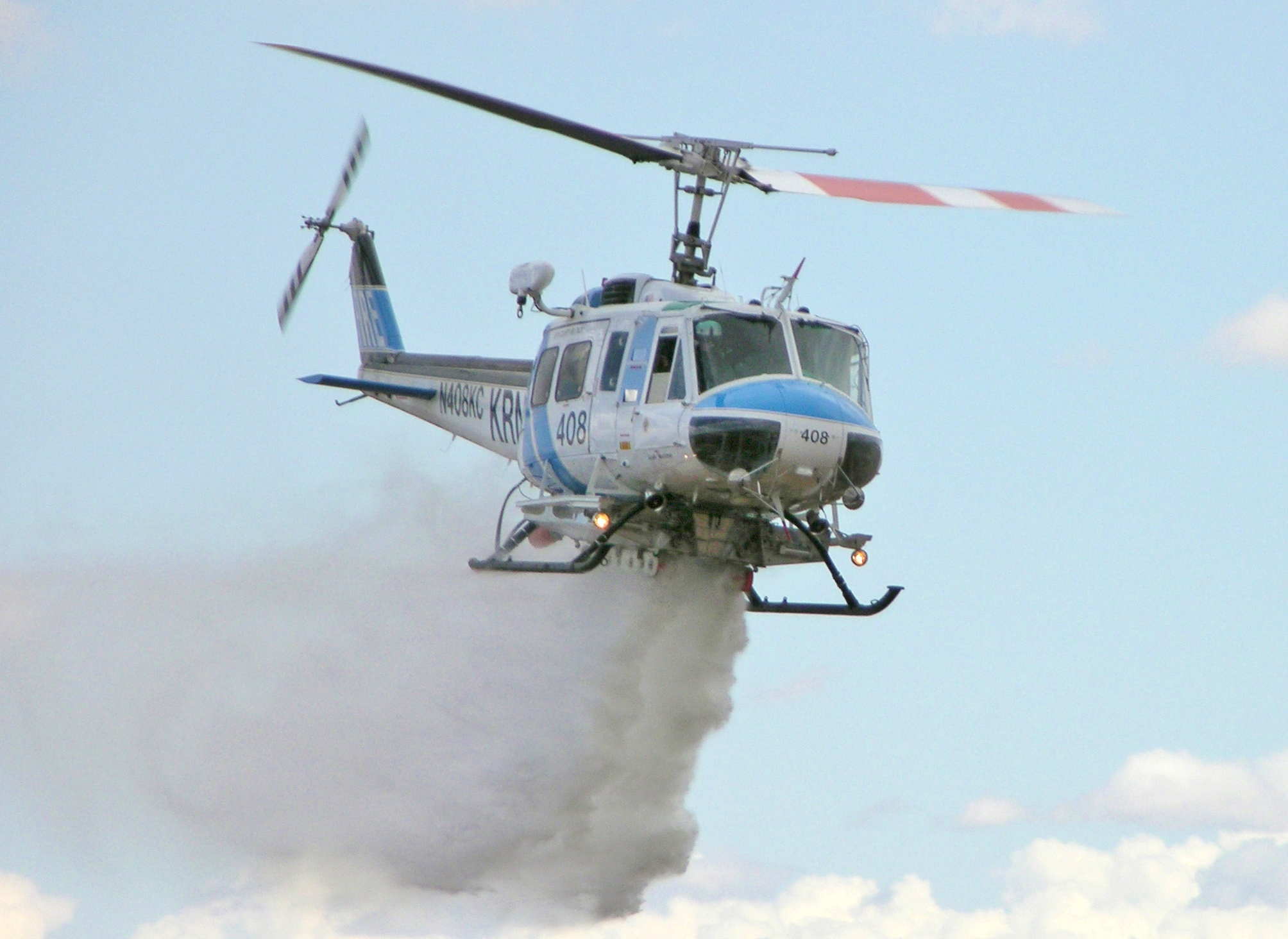
Kern County Bell 205A++ Super Huey dropping water

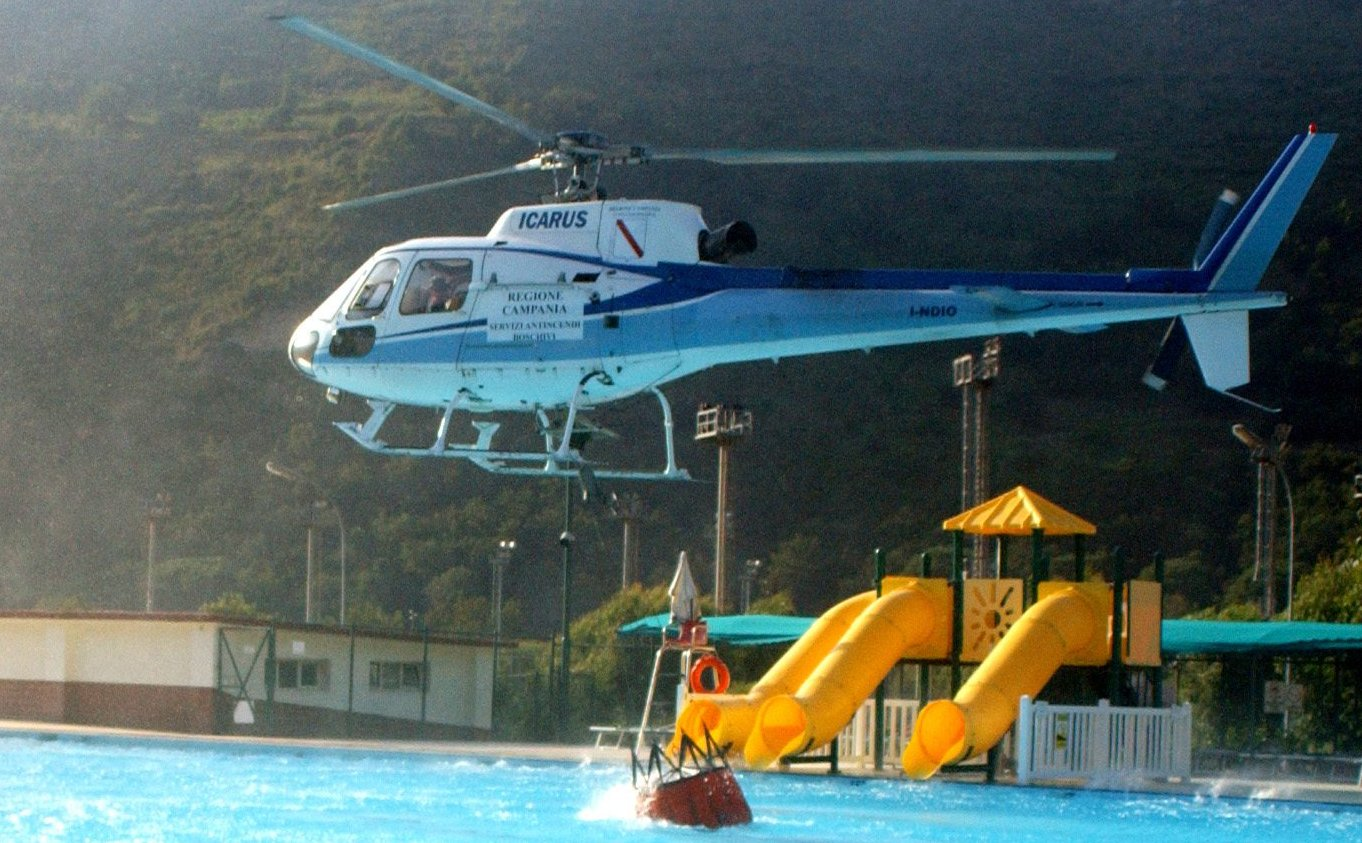
A Eurocopter Ecureuil dips its bucket into a swimming pool before returning to drop the water on a wildfire outside Naples, Italy

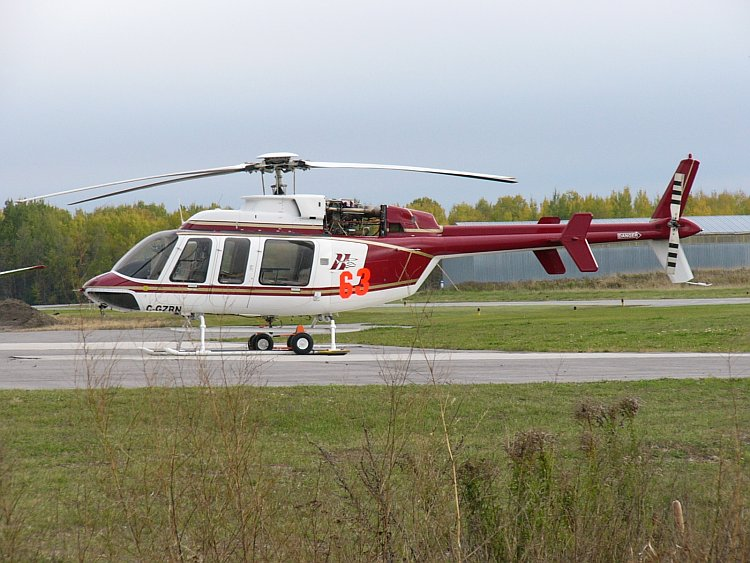
Helitack 63: A typical light helicopter used in fire fighting, this Bell 407 served with the Ontario Ministry of Natural Resources during the 2007 fire season

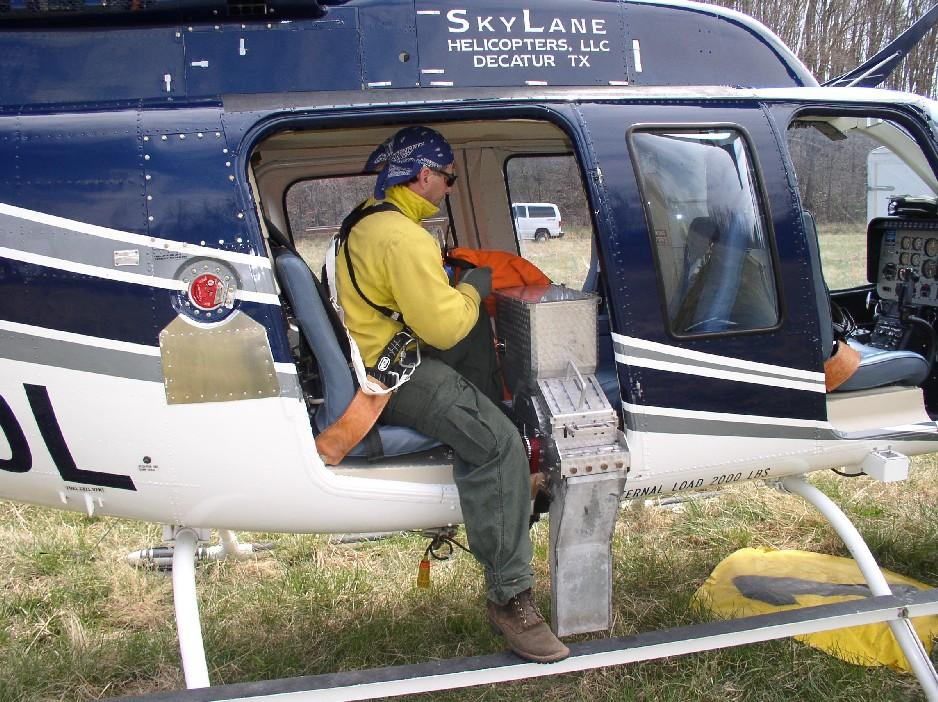
Plastic sphere dispenser on a Bell 206L LongRanger, on the Bar Complex Fire

A video of a Bell 407 helicopter working with ground firefighters by dropping water from a bucket.

== See also ==
- Helicopter bucket
- Glossary of wildland fire terms
- Wildland fire suppression
