= 2026 Utah wildfires =

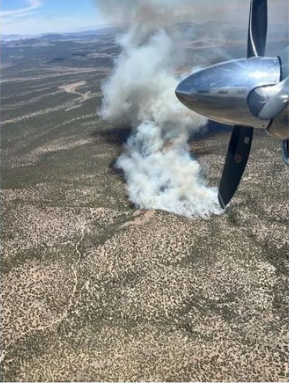
- Aerial view of the Sawmill Fire on June 16

Statistics
- Total fires: 25
- Total area: 300,000 acres (120,000 ha; 470 sq mi)

Impacts
- Deaths: 3
- Injuries: 2
- Structures destroyed: 180+
- Cost: $50 million USD

A series of major wildfires are currently burning throughout the U.S. state of Utah.

== Background ==
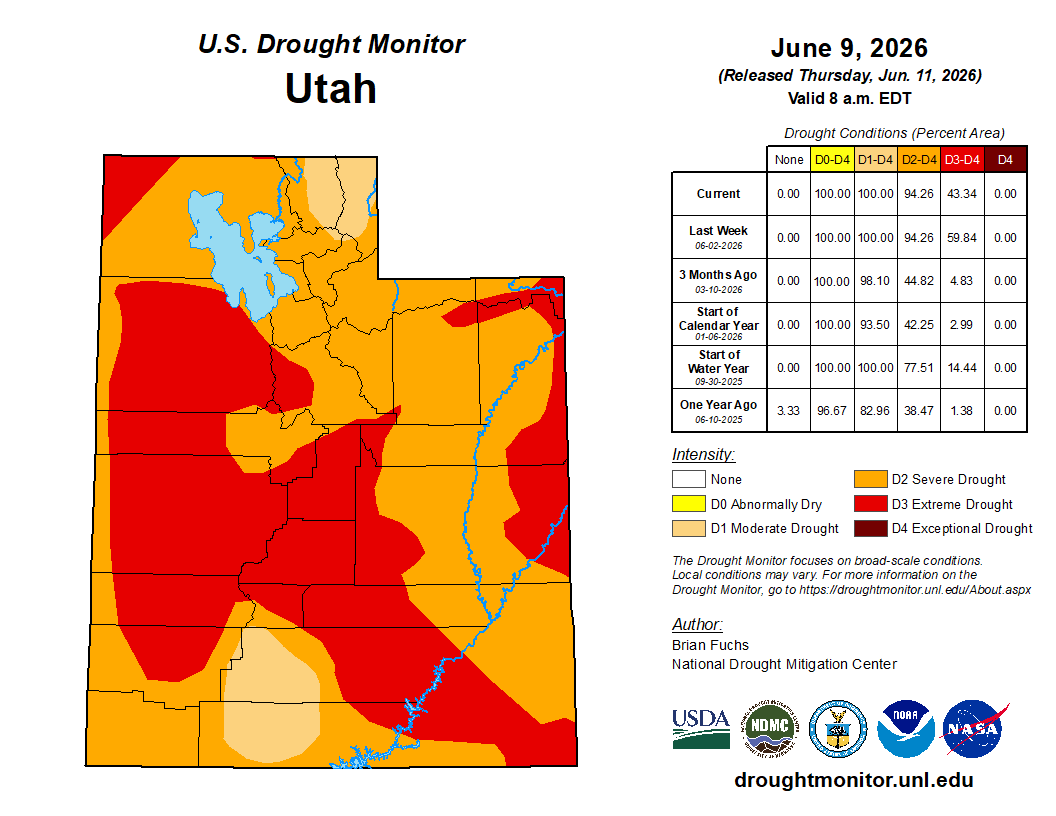
Utah drought monitor on June 9

While the typical wildfire season in Utah varies, most fires occur in between July and October. Fire conditions can heavily depend on monsoons that last from late June to September. Dry monsoons can allow fires to start and spread easier, while wet ones can cause fire relief. Additionally, hot temperatures and overall dry conditions play a large role.

== Summary ==
The 2025–26 winter was the warmest on record for Utah and had one of the lowest recorded snowpack for the state, leaving many fuels dry enough to foster fire conditions as early as March. In Southern Utah, vegetation is some of the driest as it has been the past century. Forecasts predict a potentially active monsoon season, however, it is likely to be late onset until late July.

For June 2026, the National Interagency Fire Center (NIFC) has predicted above-average fire potential throughout all of Utah, with the Great Basin Coordination Center predicting the highest fire activity in Northern Utah from August to September.

In June, drought and multi-day red flag conditions fueled multiple fast-moving and significant wildfires, with the largest at the time being the Iron fire and Cottonwood fire. These fires and other fires around them resulted in a state and nationwide response that required numerous resources. Three firefighters were killed and two were sent to the hospital on June 27 when the Snyder fire overran them as they were trying to take shelter; a fourth died from injuries sustained in the fire on July 24. That fire has since crossed into neighboring Colorado. The babylon fire exploded a few days after these fires started grabbing resources from other states, showcasing just how dry and volatile the fuels were.

On June 25, Utah Governor Spencer Cox announced a temporary statewide fireworks restrictions amid historic wildfire conditions, as woodland firefighters fought blazes around the state. In the announcement, it was noted that human causes were suspected in 75% of the wildfires in the state thus far in 2026.

== List of wildfires ==
The following is a list of fires that burned more than 1,000 acres (400 ha), produced significant structural damage, or resulted in casualties.

Name	County	Acres	Start date	Containment date (Note: Containment means that fire crews have established and secured control lines around the fire's perimeter. These lines are artificial barriers, like trenches or cleared vegetation, designed to stop the fire's spread, or natural barriers like rivers. Containment reflects progress in managing the fire but does not necessarily mean the fire is starved of fuel, under control, or put out.)	Notes	Image	Ref.
Wild Horse	Juab, Millard	7,025	May 13	May 19	Burned south of Leamington and caused power outages.		
Tower	Millard	1,369	June 7	June 15	Burned south of Scipio. Closed U.S. 50. Impacted air quality throughout Utah.		
South Mountain	Tooele	1,865	June 8	June 13	Human-caused. Burned west of Stockton and caused power outages.		
Sawmill	Iron	3,790	June 16	July 1	Cause under investigation. Prompted evacuations and burned northwest of Lund.		
Iron	Utah, Juab, Tooele	41,842	June 19	July 3	Human-caused. Burned just to the west of Eureka, reaching the north end of town and caused evacuations for the whole town. Merged with the Cherry fire on June 26.		
Hastings	Tooele	26,422.6	June 20	June 26	Unknown cause. Burned near Hastings Pass and impacted recreation.		
Cottonwood	Beaver, Piute	97,464	June 22	95%	Unknown cause. Burning near Beaver moving east then evacuated Eagle Point. Grew past 10,000 acres in a few hours on its first day, required a unified response with over 1,000 firefighters.		
Cherry	Juab, Tooele	34,252	June 26	July 7	Merged with the Iron Fire and grew rapidly after merging with multiple other fires shortly after ignition. Prompting evacuations.		
Wild Goose	Millard	12,665	June 26	July 19	Closed U.S. 50 and prompting evacuations.		
Babylon	San Juan	107,189	June 26	95%	Closing portions of Manti-La Sal National Forest and grew aggressively to the north, 5 structures destroyed.		
Snyder	Grand, Mesa (CO)	28,264	June 27	July 17	Killed four helitack firefighters in Colorado. Prompted pre-evacuations and grew to 28,000 acres in one day, which forced firefighters to temporarily stop fighting the fire.		
Stookey	Tooele	11,881	July 10	July 30	Human-caused. Burned in the Onaqui Mountains west of Last Chance Lakes. Prompting evacuations for recreational areas.		
Widemouth 2	Millard, Sevier	121,226	July 27	26%	Lightning-caused. Burning south of Kanosh and prompting evacuations.		
Black Canyon	Emery, Sanpete	3,477	July 30	0%	Lightning-caused. Burning in Manti-La Sal National Forest. Prompting evacuations and closing forest roads and trails.		
Johnson Canyon	Box Elder	6,889	August 1	August 4	Cause under investigation. Burned in Tremonton.		

== See also ==
- 2026 Arizona wildfires
- 2026 Colorado wildfires
- 2026 Idaho wildfires
- 2026 Nevada wildfires
- 2026 New Mexico wildfires
- 2026 United States wildfires
- 2026 Wyoming wildfires
