= Hiram A. McNeil =

American politician

Colorado State Representative
- Preceded by: Frank Meaker
- Succeeded by: Walter J. Waldow

Personal details
- Born: July 14, 1903 Olathe, Colorado
- Died: Oct. 20, 1975 Montrose, Colorado
- Party: Democratic
- Spouse: Pearl McNeil Pickens
- Children: William 'Bill' McNeil
- Occupation: Farmer, Politician

Hiram A. McNeil was a state representative from Olathe, Colorado in Montrose County, Colorado. A Democrat, McNeil served 20 years in the Colorado General Assembly from 1955 thru 1974. Hiram McNeil's districts included all or part of the Colorado Western Slope counties of Montrose County, Colorado, Ouray County, Colorado, Dolores County, Colorado, San Juan County, Colorado, Hinsdale County, Colorado, Montezuma County, Colorado, San Miguel County, Colorado, Saguache County, Colorado, Gunnison County, Colorado, and Delta County, Colorado.

== Background ==
Hiram A. McNeil was born in Olathe, Colorado in 1903. Prior to his birth, Hiram McNeil's family moved to western Colorado in 1876 and homesteaded near Ridgway, in 1881. Hiram and his wife bought a farm from her father in Bostwick Park, in 1935. The McNeil family grew potatoes & Moravian malting barley for Adolph Coors Co. He also served on the board of directors for Cimarron Ditch & Reservoir Co. McNeil's political role and director role with Cimarron Ditch & Reservoir Co. would serve critical for the passing of Congress's 1963 H.R. 3672, An Act to provide for the construction, operation, and maintenance of the Savery-Pot Hook, Bostwick Park, and Fruitland Mesa participating reclamation projects under the Colorado River Storage Project Act. The Bostwick Park Project is the funding component for Silver Jack Dam.

== Elections ==
Prior to the election cycle of 1964, Colorado did not number their legislative districts.

=== General Election - 1954 ===
1954 General Election for State Representative Montrose & Ouray Counties
County	Hiram A. McNeil	P.J. Campbell
Montrose	2,415	2,387
Ouray	498	449
Total	2,913	2,836

=== General Election - 1956 ===
1956 General Election for State Representative Montrose & Ouray Counties
County	Hiram A. McNeil	Herbert W. Ross	Total
Montrose	3,742	2,707	6,449
Ouray	511	451	962
Total	4,253	3,158	7,411

=== General Election - 1958 ===
1959 General Election for State Representative Montrose & Ouray Counties
County	Hiram A. McNeil	George R. Lindfelt	Total
Montrose	3,243	2,292	5,535
Ouray	597	364	961
Total	3,840	2,656	6,496

=== General Election - 1960 ===
1960 General Election for State Representative Montrose & Ouray Counties
County	Hiram A. McNeil	Pete J. Campbell	Total
Montrose	4,179	2,679	6,858
Ouray	515	425	940
Total	4,694	3,104	7,798

=== General Election - 1962 ===
1962 General Election for State Representative Montrose & Ouray Counties
County	Hiram A. McNeil	Robert M. Tinus
Montrose	3,019	2,440
Ouray	493	323
Total	3,512	2,763

=== General Election - 1964 ===
1964 General Election for State Representative District 64
County	Hiram A. McNeil	Joe E. Hardy	Total
Dolores	435	331	766
Montrose	3,835	2,621	6,456
Ouray	533	313	846
San Juan	230	156	386
San Miguel	434	573	1,007
Total	5,467	3,994	9,461

=== General Election - 1966 ===
1966 General Election for State Representative District 25
Counties	Hiram A. McNeil	B.C. (Burt) Collins	Total
Dolores	398	222	620
Montrose	3,116	2,918	6,034
Ouray	432	351	783
San Juan	196	132	328
San Miguel	480	286	766
Total	4,622	3,909	8,531

=== General Election - 1968 ===
1968 General Election for State Representative District 65
Counties	Hiram A. McNeil	B.C. Collins	Total
Dolores	418	274	692
Montezuma	321	272	593
Montrose	3,113	3,203	6,316
San Miguel	463	312	775
Total	4,315	4,061	8,376

=== General Election - 1970 ===
1970 General Election for State Representative District 65
Counties	Hiram A. McNeil	Richard A. Whitney	Total
Dolores	373	234	607
Montezuma	319	238	557
Montrose	2,656	2,547	5,203
San Miguel	419	365	784
Total	3,767	3,384	7,151

=== General Election - 1972 ===
1972 General Election for State Representative District 58
Counties	Hiram A. McNeil	Ralph E. Porter	Total
Delta	215	388	603
Dolores	386	272	658
Gunnison	1,293	1,981	3,274
Hinsdale	53	154	207
Montezuma	184	137	321
Montrose	3,655	3,102	6,757
Ouray	430	444	874
Saguache	20	30	50
San Juan	248	157	405
San Miguel	636	357	993
Total	7,120	7,022	14,142

== Committees ==
House Standing Committee Assignments
Year	Committee 1	Committee 2	Committee 3	Committee 4
1955	Agriculture & Livestock	Education		
1956	Agriculture & Livestock	Education		
1957	Water (Chair)	Agriculture & Livestock (Vice-Chair)	Local Government	State Affairs
1958	Water (Chair)	Agriculture & Livestock (Vice-Chair)	Local Government	State Affairs
1959	Water (Chair)	Agriculture & Livestock	Appropriations	State Affairs
1960	Water (Chair)	Agriculture & Livestock	Appropriations	State Affairs
1961	Agriculture & Livestock (Chair)	Appropriations	Natural Resources	State Affairs
1962	Agriculture & Livestock (Chair)	Appropriations	Natural Resources	State Affairs
1963	Agriculture & Livestock	Appropriations	Natural Resources	State Affairs
1964	Agriculture & Livestock	Appropriations	Natural Resources	State Affairs
1965	Agriculture & Livestock (Chair)	Local Government	State Affairs	
1966	Agriculture & Livestock (Chair)	Local Government	State Affairs	
1967	Agriculture & Livestock	Game, Fish & Parks	Natural Resources	
1968	Agriculture & Livestock	Game, Fish & Parks	Natural Resources	
1970	Agriculture & Livestock	Game, Fish & Parks	Natural Resources	
1971	Game, Fish & Parks	Natural Resources	State Affairs	
1972	Game, Fish & Parks	Natural Resources	State Affairs	
1973	Game, Fish & Parks	Natural Resources	State Affairs	
1974	Game, Fish & Parks	Natural Resources	State Affairs	

Joint Statutory Committees
Year	Committee
1971	Legislative Council
1972	Legislative Council
1973	Legislative Council
1974	Legislative Council

Interim Committee Assignments
Year	Committee 1	Committee 2	Committee 3
1959	Agricultural Industry Laws (HJR12)		
1960	Agricultural Industry Laws (HJR 6)		
1961	Reapportionment (HJR 24)		
1963	Freeport Provisions (HJR 25)	Water Problems	
1964	Property Tax (HJR25)	Water (HJR 1030)	
1965	Financing State & Local Government (HJR 1024)	Property Exempt from Taxation (HJR 1024)	State & Local Taxes - Subcommittee on Property Taxation
1966	Tax Exempt Property (HJR 1024)		
1967	Game Fish & Parks Commission (SJR 42)	State & Local Taxes	
1970	District Attorneys		
1971	Legislative Reapportionment & Congressional Redistricting (HJR 1033)	Weather Modification (HJR 1033)	
1972	Highway	Financing (SJR 7)	
1973	Federal & State Lands	Water	
1974	Federal & State Lands	Water	
