= Middle Fork River (disambiguation) =

Middle Fork River may refer to:

- Middle Fork River
- Middle Fork Cimarron River
- Middle Fork Eel River
- Middle Fork Elk River
- Middle Fork Feather River
- Middle Fork Flathead River
- Middle Fork John Day River
- Middle Fork Kings River
- Middle Fork Little Snake River
- Middle Fork Salmon River
- Middle Fork South Platte River
- Middle Fork Vermilion River
- Middle Fork Willamette River

== See also ==
- North Fork Middle Fork Willamette River
