= Aspen Acres Fire =

2026 wildfire in southern Colorado

- Part of the 2026 Colorado wildfires
- A time lapse of the fire from its ignition on June 29 to noon on July 4
- Date: June 29, 2026 – ongoing
- Location: Custer County and Pueblo County, Colorado, U.S.
- Coordinates: 38.01°N 105.071°W

Statistics
- Status: Ongoing wildfire
- Perimeter: 94% contained
- Burned area: 102,007 acres (41,281 ha; 413 km^{2}; 159 sq mi)

Impacts
- Deaths: 1
- Injuries: 2 (firefighters)
- Evacuated: 4,000
- Structures destroyed: 850

Ignition
- Cause: Human, under investigation

Map
- Perimeter map of Aspen Acres Fire (map data) Map of the Aspen Acres fire
- Location within Colorado

The Aspen Acres Fire is a large, ongoing, and destructive wildfire in Custer, Pueblo, and Huerfano counties in southern Colorado, approximately 20 miles southwest of Pueblo. As of October 31, 2026, it has burned 102,007 acres (41,281 ha) and is 94% contained. It is the eighth largest wildfire in the state's history and has damaged or destroyed over 850 structures, including 319 homes.

It was the largest wildfire burning in Colorado.

== Background ==
In late June 2026, much of southern and central Colorado was experiencing severe drought and high winds, leading to red flag conditions.

== Progression ==
The fire was first reported on June 29, 2026 and grew to over 23,000 acres (9,300 ha) the same day, driven several miles east by the high winds. Mandatory evacuations were widespread in and around the town of Beulah as a result. The fire mostly burnt the outskirts of the town but still caused significant damage.

On July 2, more high winds caused the fire to grow heavily to the north and extend south where the head of the fire jumped several roadways and threatened Colorado City and Rye. The western side of town was told to evacuate to the east away from the approaching fire. Evacuations continued overnight until around 12:00 a.m., when the entire city was told to evacuate.

By July 3, it was the top firefighting priority in Colorado and the United States. The Federal Emergency Management Agency issued grants to cover up to 75 percent of firefighting costs as the fire surpassed 66,000 acres, with continued zero percent containment. An Alaska incident management team assumed command of the fire as it was declared the state's ninth largest.

On July 4, the fire had grown to over 87,000 acres and had destroyed at least 212 structures. It continued moving at a more moderate pace to the north and west, running up saint Charles Peak. The Alaska incident management team confirmed that the fire was at 6% containment as of 6:45 p.m. MDT.

The fire surpassed 90,000 acres on July 5, nearly the same size as the Cottonwood Fire burning in Utah. Erratic outflow winds from thunderstorms continued to push the blaze north into Custer County, the Wetmore area, and Greenwood. Over 1,300 personnel were fighting the fire and protecting structures. Evacuations were also extended significantly into southern Fremont County not too far from Cañon City. Containment had also decreased 2% overnight.

Rain fell on most of the fire perimeter by July 8 as it surpassed 96,000 acres along with increasing containment. The most rain fell on the northern and southern edges, where fire activity was moderated and firefighters were switching to offensive tactics. The rain brought risks of mudslides and flash floods as firefighters continued operations.

As the fire surpassed 100,000 acres, efforts shifted from response to recovery. Containment had increased to 61% by July 18. Active to moderate fire behavior continued on the western side of the fire perimeter, primarily where the slope and winds aligned. A flash flood watch was also issued in the immediate proximity of the burn scar due to thunderstorm rains from the remnants of Hurricane Polo.

== Evacuations ==
The fire forced at least 4,000 people to evacuate from numerous towns, including Colorado City, Rye, Beulah, Williamsburg, Coal Creek and Rockvale. Pre-evacuations were issued for residents on national forest land and major highways and in multiple counties. Mandatory evacuations were also issued for the communities of Wetmore, San Isabel, and the San Isabel National Forest.

Localized flash flooding near the burn scar forced evacuations in the San Isabel area on County Road 378 due to road and structural damage. On August 16, Henry Humphreys of Beulah drowned as a flash flood raged through the burn scar.

== Effects ==
The fire has destroyed over 850 structures; crews had estimated 212 in the days prior to a full damage assessment. In addition, the fire affected three water treatment plants and closed sections of state highways 165, 78, 67, and 96. The fire also caused smoke and air quality concerns for parts of the state, and a temporary flight restriction was put in place above its perimeter.

Damage assessments are still ongoing regarding the effects the fire had on Beulah, given more favorable weather conditions.

The scorched, hydrophobic soil has provided conditions for flash flooding in the burn scar. One person was killed in Beulah due to localized flash flooding. Many structures, houses, and roads were damaged due to flooding.

The historic Horseshoe Lodge and most of the Pueblo Mountain Park was lost to the fire. Many homes on the outskirts of the communities of Beulah and Rye were damaged or destroyed but the center part of the towns were not affected. Many residents have had several power outages and no drinkable tap water.

== See also ==
- 2026 Colorado wildfires
- 2026 United States wildfires
- Snyder Fire – 2026 wildfire on the Colorado–Utah border
