= East Fork Cimarron River =

Physical characteristics
- Mouth
  - location: Confluence with Middle Fork
  - coordinates: 38°12′15″N 107°31′11″W
  - elevation: 9,022 ft (2,750 m)

Basin features
- Progression: Cimarron—Gunnison—Colorado

East Fork Cimarron River is a 12.6-mile-long (20.3 km) tributary of the Cimarron River in Colorado. The river's source is near Wetterhorn Peak in the Uncompahgre Wilderness of Hinsdale County. It joins the Middle Fork Cimarron River in Gunnison County to form the Cimarron River, and is impounded by Silver Jack Dam.

== See also ==
- List of rivers of Colorado
- List of tributaries of the Colorado River
