= Babylon Fire =

2026 wildfire in Utah

- Part of the 2026 Utah wildfires
- Date: June 26, 2026 – August 12, 2026

Statistics
- Perimeter: 100% contained
- Burned area: 107,189 acres

Impacts
- Deaths: 0
- Structures destroyed: 5

Ignition
- Cause: Lightning

The Babylon Fire was a large wildfire that burned in the southeastern part of Utah. It was contained on August 12, 2026, having burned 107,189 acres. It was the second largest wildfire of the 2026 Utah wildfire season, and at one point the largest in the entire United States.

== Progression ==
The fire was reported around 2:15 pm MDT on June 26, 2026. By 7:00 pm, the fire had spread to 120 acres and was zero percent contained. It initially burned slowly, burning 300 acres by June 27.Driven by red flag conditions, on June 28, the fire rapidly expanded to the northeast, expanding to 16,171 acres, an expansion of nearly 53 times its size. This figure had grown to 38,399 acres by early on June 29 in steep terrain and wind alignment. Crews have confirmed that 5 structures had been destroyed.

The fire had then expanded to 53,871 acres by June 30 running up and around Horse Mountain, with the fire still expanding to over 70,000 acres on July 1. On July 3 and the 4, after some slightly moderated fire growth (still growing at least 5,000 acres a day), flames changed direction due to a wind shift and made a run toward Monticello. In result, the fire grew steadily to 90,445 acres by July 5. That day, several evacuation warnings were issued to the east due to an increase in fire activity near the Skull and Crossbones Summit. This was however said to be "anticipated" by firefighters continuing operations and digging containment lines.

The next morning, the fire was mapped at over 96,000 acres, making it the largest wildfire burning in the United States, and the largest wildfire of the year in Utah, surpassing the Cottonwood Fire. Over 1,000 personnel were assigned and working to halt spread as it was still 0% contained. More active fire behavior was expected and had occurred to the northeast in the coming days as soon the fire surpassed 100,000 acres. Most of this activity was caused by steep terrain, fuel loading, and incredibly dry conditions.

== Effects ==
The fire caused emergency closures for the areas in and around the Manti–La Sal National Forest, which would extend all of the way until August of this year. This means that access is blocked to the public by firefighters in order for them to work the fire safely. The Needles District of Canyonlands National Park is fully closed as well. The Bureau of Land Management temporarily closed areas miles large in areas that were deemed unsafe for people to visit. The fire also caused air quality concerns for much of the region, including Monticello.That same day, fire containment increased to 11%, and then 21% the next day.

== Growth and Containment ==
Date	Acres Burned	Containment	Citation
June 26	120	0%	
June 27	300	0%	
June 28	16,171		
June 29	38,399		
June 30	53,871		
July 1	70,734		
July 2	79,795		
July 3	85,370		
July 4	87,660		
July 5	90,445		
July 6	96,564		
July 7	100,478	11%	
July 8	101,073	21%	
July 9	102,932	25%	
July 10	103,633	44%	
July 11	104,252	47%	
July 12-14	106,610	50%	
July 15	107,104	57%	
July 16	107,173	62%	
July 17	107,173	82%	
July 18	107,173	93%	
July 19	107,173	95%	

== See also ==
- 2026 United States wildfires
- 2026 Utah wildfires
- Cottonwood Fire (Utah, 2026) – 2026 Utah wildfire
- Snyder Fire – 2026 wildfire on the Colorado–Utah border
