= Helicopter rescue basket =

Equipment to transport people suspended below a helicopter

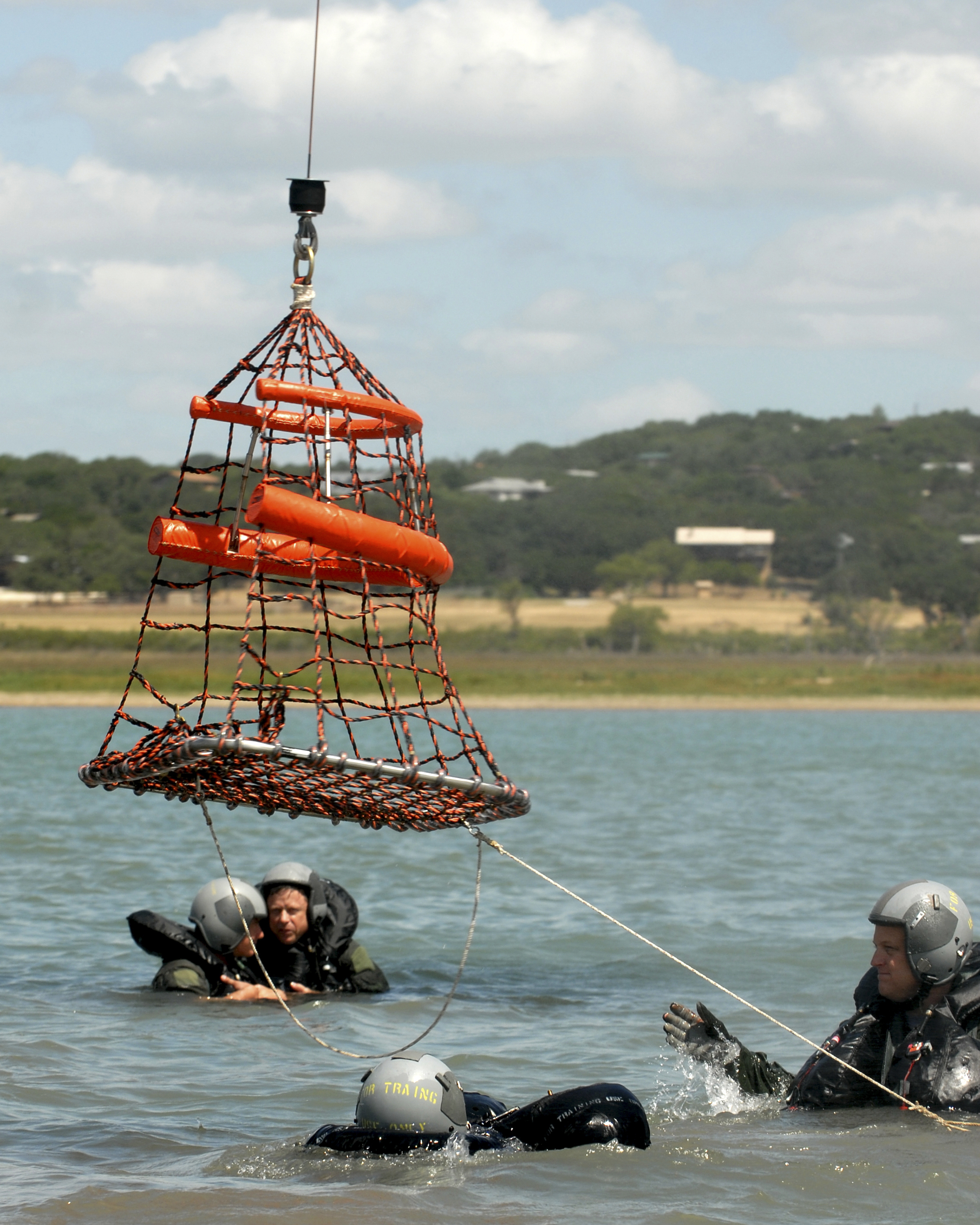
An aerial rescue basket in water survival training.

A helicopter rescue basket is a basket suspended below a helicopter in order to rescue people from a fire or other disaster site.

== Uses ==
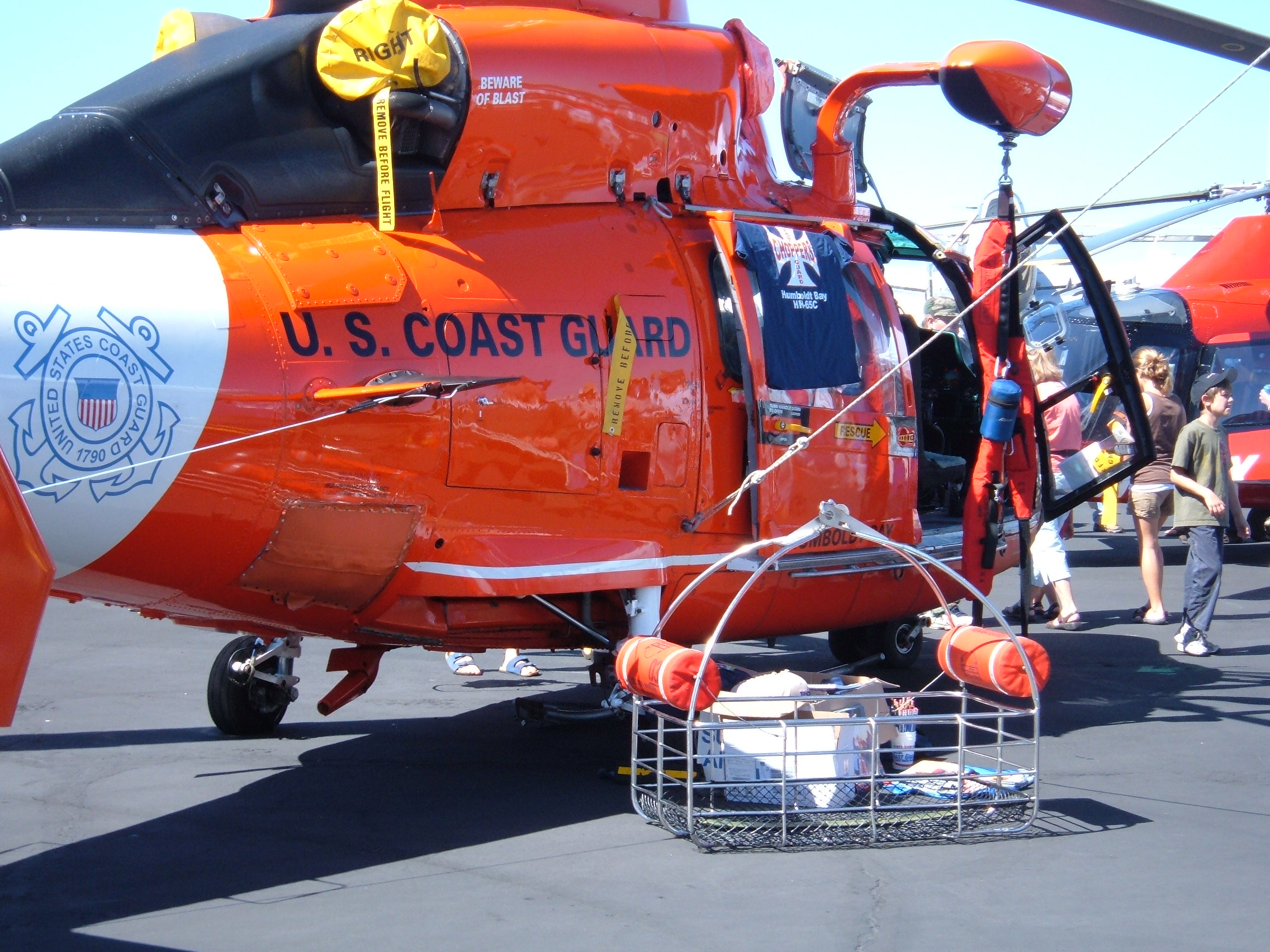
U.S. Coast Guard helicopter with rescue basket

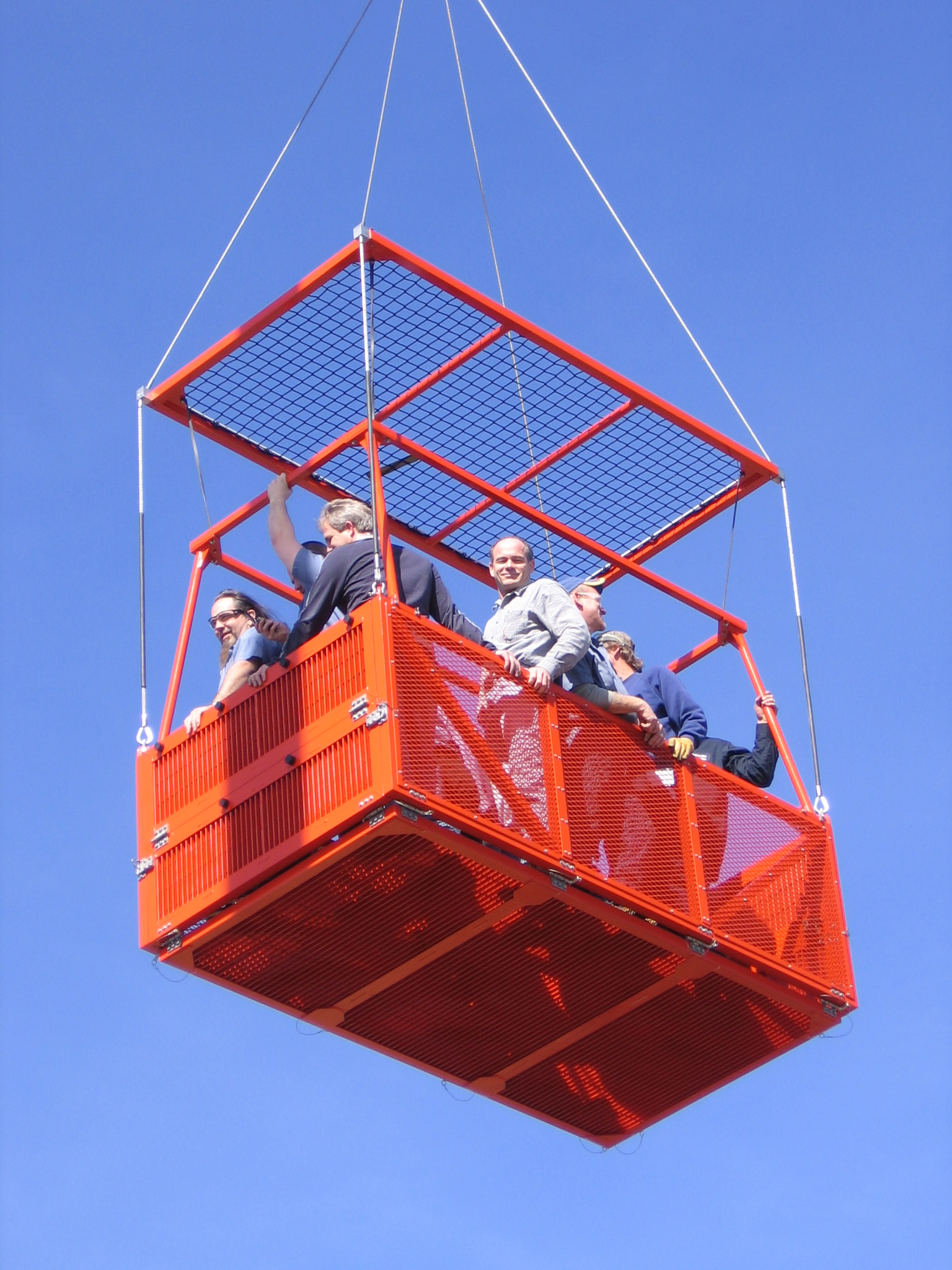
Heli-Basket in Anderson, SC

There are two main types of helicopter baskets. The smaller, more common type is used by rescuers to lift a person up from ground or water into the helicopter. An early type that could scoop an unconscious person from the sea was the Sproule Net, invented by Lt Cdr John Sproule, RN, in 1956 which was used by British helicopter rescue units until the late 1970s.

The second type is a new invention. This is a basket able to fit five people or more. It allows a large group of people to be rescued from a fire or other emergency site, without needing to load them into the helicopter itself. It enables the helicopter to load a large group without landing. The helicopter hovers over the site and rests the basket on the ground or other surface. Evacuees board, then are transported to a safe area.

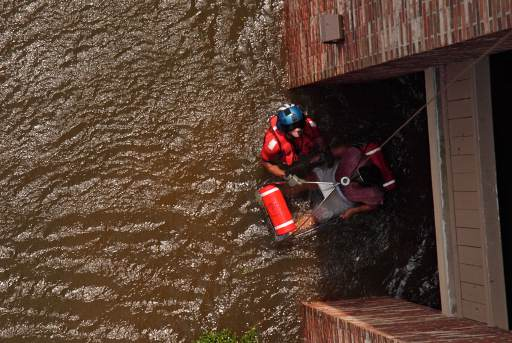
Basket rescue after Hurricane Katrina

This type of basket was tested by the Air National Guard in 2006, and were found to be quite functional. Guard personnel tested out a basket which could fit up to 15 people, at the Air National Guard-Air Force Reserve Command Test Center at Tucson, Ariz. The basket which was tested is known as the Heli-Basket, is 4-and-a-half foot by 8-and-a-half feet, and hangs on a 125-foot cable below an HH-60G Pave Hawk helicopter. it was invented by John Tollenaere, of the company Precision Lift, Inc.

== See also ==
- Search and rescue
- Helicopter bucket
- Rescue swimmer
