= Helicopter bucket =

Bucket used by helicopters in aerial firefighting

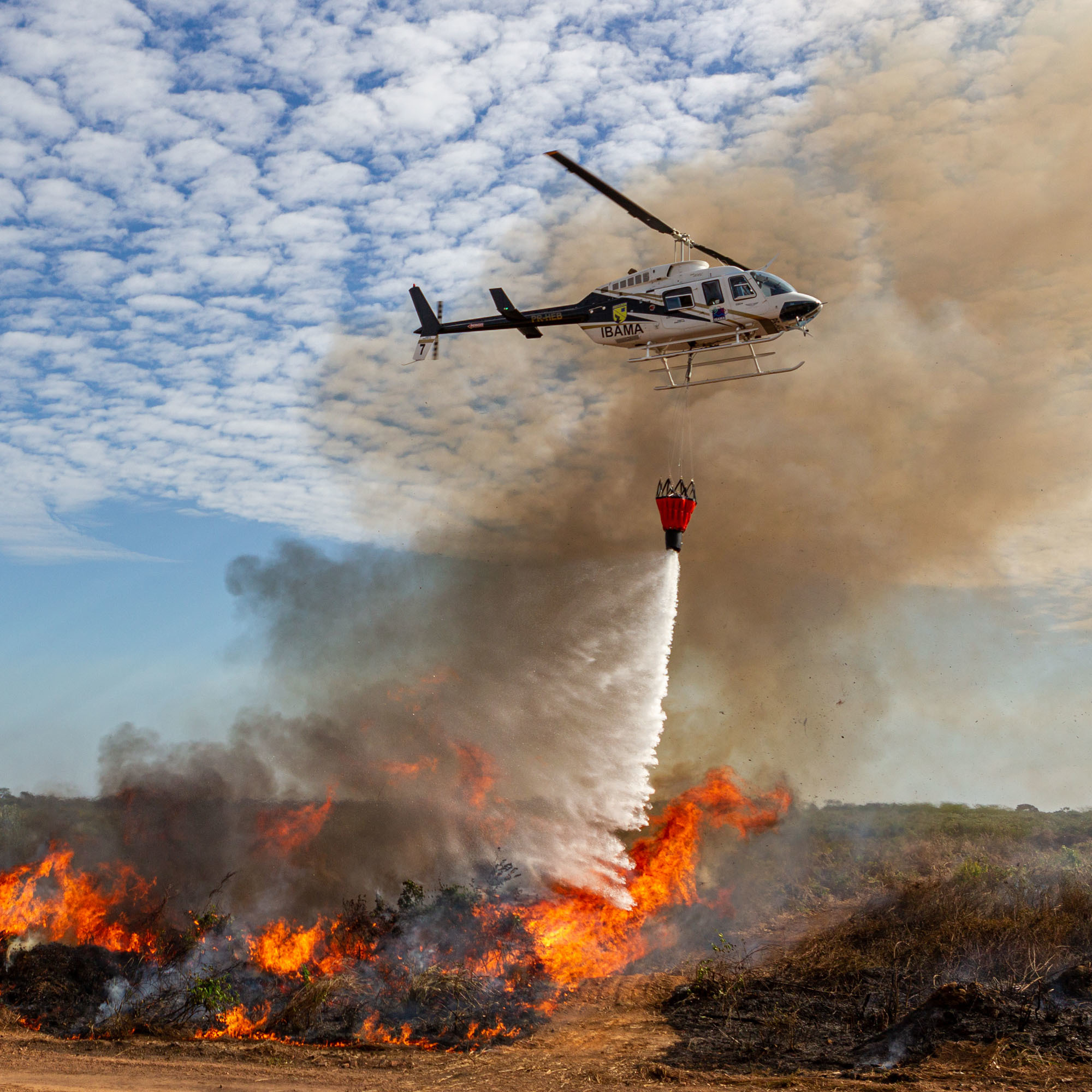
A Bell 206 using a bucket during a training flight in Maranhão, Brazil

A helicopter bucket or helibucket is a specialized bucket suspended on a cable carried by a helicopter to deliver water for aerial firefighting. The design of the buckets allows the helicopter to hover over a water source—such as a lake, river, pond, or tank—and lower the bucket into the water to refill it. This allows the helicopter crew to operate the bucket in remote locations without the need to return to a permanent operating base, reducing the time between successive drops.

Each bucket has a release valve on the bottom which is controlled by the helicopter crew. When the helicopter is in position, the crew releases the water to extinguish or suppress the fire below. Each release of the water is referred to as a drop.

== Design ==
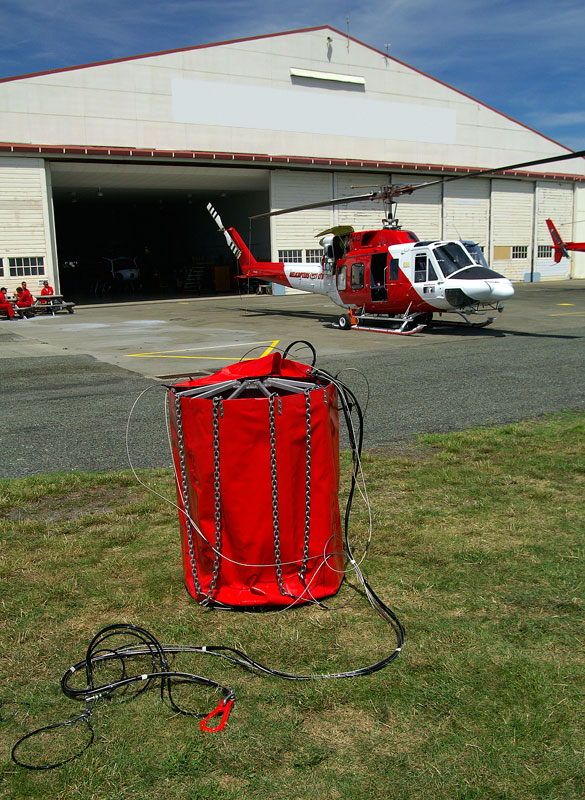
A-Flex collapsible monsoon bucket

Buckets can be collapsible or rigid and vary in capacity from 72 to 2,600 U.S. gallons (60 to 2,165 imperial gallons; 273 to 9,842 liters). The size of each bucket is determined by the lifting capacity of the helicopter required to utilise each version. Some buckets can include fire retardant foam or the ability to pump water from the bucket into an internal tank. Smaller collapsible buckets can use water sources as shallow as 1 foot (30.5 cm). Worldwide, the term monsoon bucket is widely used and accepted as a generic term. In the United States, this type of bucket is officially referred to as a helibucket. The trademarked Bambi Bucket is also commonly used informally by firefighting crews to describe buckets developed by other manufacturers.

== Variants ==
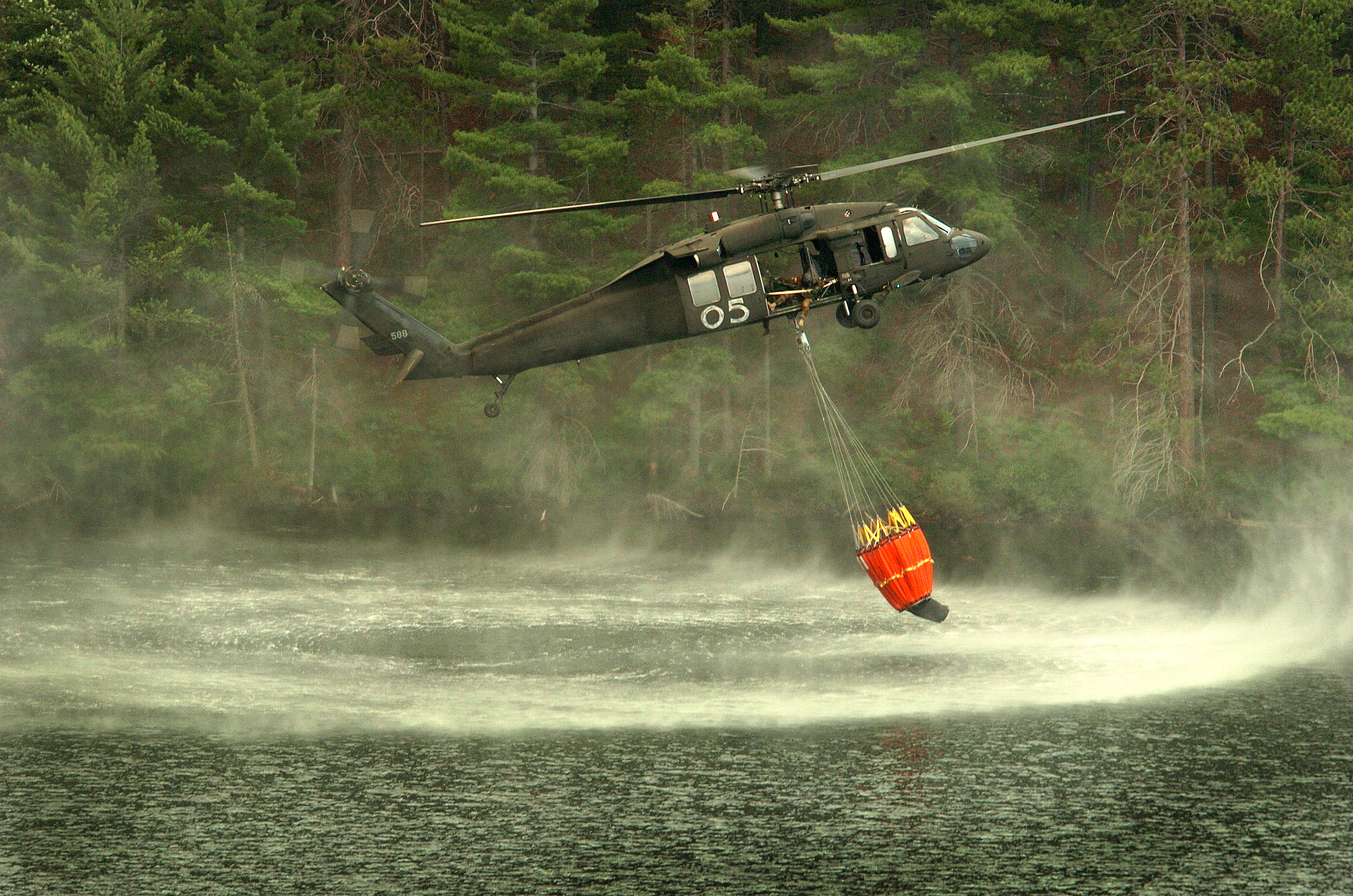
A UH-60 Black Hawk lowering a Bambi Bucket into a lake in Michigan, United States

A number of companies produce buckets, including A-Flex Technology, SEI Industries, IMSNZ Ltd., Absolute Fire Solutions, Rural Fire Service, and Aerial Fire Control Pty., Kawak Aviation Technologies.

== See also ==
- Helicopter rescue basket
- Helitack — helicopter-delivered fire resources
- Cargo hook (helicopter)
