= Snyder Fire =

2026 wildfire on the Colorado–Utah border

- Part of the 2026 Colorado wildfires and 2026 Utah wildfires
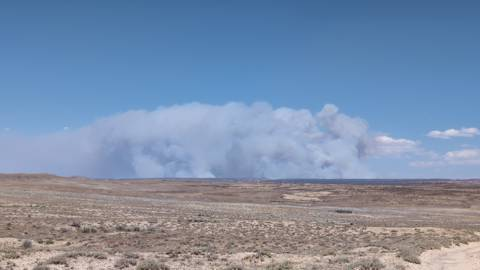
- The Snyder Fire burns near Westwater Canyon on the afternoon of June 27th, 2026.
- Date: June 27, 2026 – July 17, 2026
- Location: Mesa County, Colorado, and Grand County, Utah, U.S.

Statistics
- Status: Ongoing wildfire
- Burned area: 28,264 acres (11,438 ha; 114 km^{2}; 44 sq mi)

Impacts
- Deaths: 4 (firefighters)
- Injuries: 1 (firefighters)

Ignition
- Cause: Under investigation; believed to have originated from multiple lightning-ignited fires

The Snyder Fire was a wildfire burning along the Colorado–Utah border in Mesa County, Colorado, and Grand County, Utah. It formed late on June 27, 2026, when several smaller lightning-caused fires—the Snyder Mesa, Jones, Knowles, and Gore fires—merged amid extreme wind-driven fire behavior. As of 3 July 2026, the fire had burned an estimated 30,193 acres (12,219 ha). On July 17th, the National Interagency Fire Center declared the fire to be 100% contained with a final size of 28,264 acres.. A burnover incident on the night of June 27 killed four federal wildland firefighters and injured another, making the Snyder Fire one of the deadliest wildfire incidents for firefighters in the western United States in 2026.

The fire was one of several large, simultaneous wildfires burning across the Western Slope of Colorado and southern Utah during a period of extreme heat, low humidity, and gusting winds, including the Gold Mountain Fire near Ouray, the Ferris Fire near Dolores, The Babylon fire In south-western Utah and the Aspen Acres Fire in southern colarado. and the Cottonwood Fire burning in southern Utah.

== Background ==
In late June 2026, much of the Western Slope of Colorado and the Four Corners region of Utah was experiencing severe drought, single-digit relative humidity, and gusting winds, conditions which fire officials said had stretched firefighting capacity to its limits across the region. The National Weather Service office in Grand Junction issued red flag warnings for the area, later upgrading conditions to a "Particularly Dangerous Situation" due to strong winds, low humidity, and dry fuels.

According to the Upper Colorado River Interagency Fire Management Unit, the Snyder Fire originated from a cluster of separate fires sparked by lightning strikes on Bureau of Land Management (BLM) land south of the Colorado River, one of eight such fires ignited by lightning in the area over a 24-hour period.

== Progression ==
According to the Moab Valley Fire Department, the fires that would become the Snyder Fire began between approximately 11:00 p.m. on June 26 and 3:30 a.m. on June 27, 2026, on BLM land in Grand County, Utah, south of the Colorado River. The Snyder Mesa Fire was initially estimated at about 70 acres. The nearby Jones Fire was separately reported at about 20 acres the same morning.

Driven by gusting winds, the fires grew rapidly throughout the day on June 27 and crossed from Utah into Mesa County, Colorado. By Saturday evening, officials announced that the Snyder Mesa Fire and the Jones Fire had merged into a single fire, subsequently overtaking the smaller Knowles and Gore fires as well; a fire perimeter uploaded to the National Interagency Fire Center (NIFC) showed the combined fire at 28,264.4 acres. Due to extreme winds and fire behavior, all firefighting crews were pulled back to staging areas for their safety, with aircraft grounded.

That afternoon a burnover incident occurred when a wind-driven run of fire overtook Firefighters who were on the Knowles and Gore fires. Five firefighters with the U.S. Forest Service and U.S. Wildland Fire Service deployed fire shelters as the flames passed over their position; three were killed and two were transported to a hospital with burn injuries. The Department of the Interior and Forest Service, which reported the incident shortly after midnight, did not immediately identify those killed.

By Sunday morning, June 28, the BLM estimated the fire at more than 28,000 acres with zero percent containment, and said a Complex Incident Management Team would assume command of the fire by 6:00 p.m. that evening. Governor Jared Polis declared a disaster emergency for the Snyder Fire on the afternoon of June 27, authorizing deployment of the Colorado National Guard.

== Evacuations ==
On the evening of June 27, the Mesa County Sheriff's Office issued pre-evacuation notices for properties on BS Road west of 11.5 Road to the Utah border, with deputies notifying residents door to door. The notice was later expanded to cover the area from 11.5 Road to 16.5 Road along BS Road, west to the Utah border. By Sunday morning, the pre-evacuation order was extended further to include areas south of the Colorado River near Glade Park, west to Pollock Canyon Estates south of Loma; residents in the area were encouraged to irrigate their properties to help saturate the land ahead of the fire.

More than 100 campers were evacuated from the area near Mack as the fire expanded. The American Red Cross, in coordination with the Mesa County Sheriff's Office, opened an evacuation resource center at a former church for residents who had proactively evacuated; the center was later moved to Grand Junction High School. Mesa County Public Health advised residents to avoid outdoor activity during heavy smoke, to wear N95 masks if going outside was necessary, and to limit use of swamp coolers.

The BLM's Grand Junction Field Office issued an emergency closure of all BLM-managed public lands within the McInnis Canyons National Conservation Area and surrounding areas in Mesa County, effective until the fire is declared controlled.

== Impact ==
=== Effects ===
As of 28 June 2026, no structures had been confirmed destroyed and damage assessments had not yet been released; officials said structures were threatened in the path of the fire.

The Snyder Fire burned within the McInnis Canyons National Conservation Area, prompting the BLM to close the area, including recreational sites, to the public.

=== Fire progression ===
Date	Acres Burned	Containment	Citation
June 27/28	28,000	0%	
June 29	30,163	0%	
June 30	30,206	10%	
July 1	30,193	49%	

== Investigation ==
As of 28 June 2026, no agency had issued a formal determination on the cause of the fires that merged into the Snyder Fire. Fire officials attributed the ignition of the Snyder Mesa, Jones, Knowles, and Gore fires to lightning strikes that occurred over a 24-hour period on BLM land south of the Colorado River, one of eight fires sparked by lightning in the area during that window. A formal cause-and-origin investigation, standard for fires involving firefighter fatalities, was expected to follow, including a review of the burnover incident itself.

== Reactions ==
Colorado governor Jared Polis declared a disaster emergency in response to the Snyder Fire on June 27, authorizing deployment of the Colorado National Guard and activating the state Emergency Operations Plan, directing the Colorado Department of Public Safety's Division of Homeland Security and Emergency Management (DHSEM) to lead the state's response. Following news of the firefighter deaths, Polis said in a statement that he was "devastated about the loss of three heroic firefighters who died in the line of duty in Western Colorado," adding that the men and women on the front lines risk their lives to protect communities and the land.

The U.S. Wildland Fire Service said its immediate focus was on supporting the firefighters' families, friends, and fellow crewmates, and praised their bravery, dedication, and sacrifice. On Sunday, the bodies of the three firefighters were flown by helicopter to Grand Junction Regional Airport, where firefighters from departments around the region, including the Clifton Fire Protection District, formed a procession and saluted as the bodies were transferred to Mesa County Coroner's Office vehicles.

== See also ==
- 2026 United States wildfires
- 2026 Colorado wildfires – Series of wildfires
- 2026 Utah wildfires
- Aspen Acres Fire – 2026 wildfire in southern Colorado
- Babylon Fire – 2026 wildfire in Utah
- Cottonwood Fire (Utah, 2026) – 2026 Utah wildfire
