= Cottonwood Fire (Utah, 2026) =

2026 Utah wildfire

- Part of the 2026 Utah wildfires
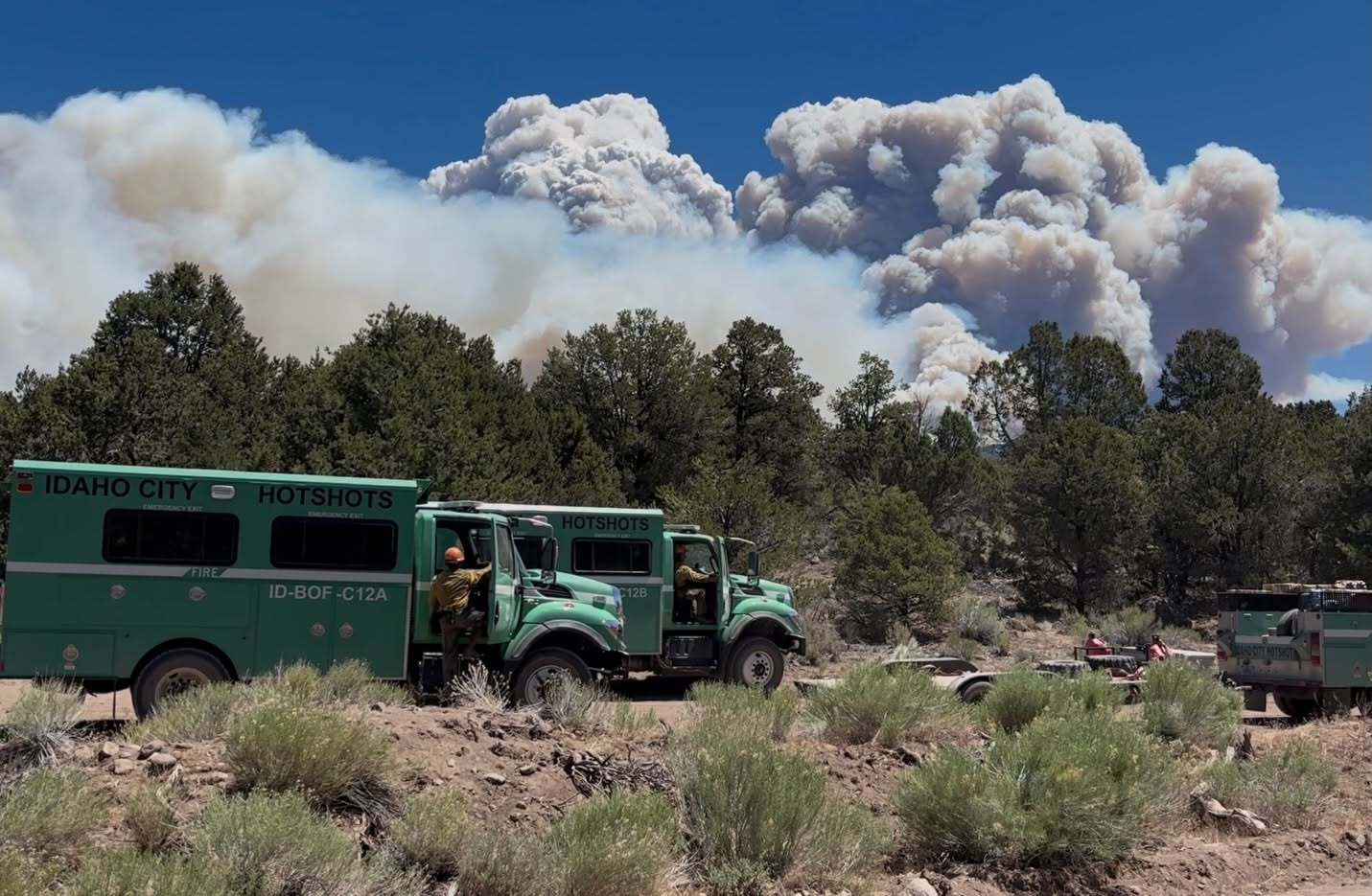
- The Cottonwood Fire on June 24
- Date: June 22 – August 31, 2026
- Location: 5 miles (8.0 km) east of Beaver, Utah

Statistics
- Perimeter: 100% contained
- Burned area: 97,464 acres (39,442 ha)

Impacts
- Deaths: 0
- Injuries: 0
- Evacuated: 450+
- Structures destroyed: ≥150
- Cost: >$20 million (suppression efforts)

Ignition
- Cause: Under investigation, potentially human caused

Map
- Perimeter map of the Cottonwood Fire, map may not be up to date (map data)

The Cottonwood Fire was a large, fast moving, and destructive wildfire burning in Piute and Beaver counties, Utah, 5 miles (8.0 km) east of Beaver. The fire ignited due to a still unknown cause on June 22, 2026 and rapidly spread, surpassing 10,000 acres (4,000 ha) in its first day, and over 60,000 acres (24,000 ha) on June 24. As of July 18, the fire has burned 97,464 acres (39,442 ha), is 95% contained, and has destroyed at least 150 structures. The fire is also the 6th largest in the state's history.

== Cause ==
Resources were sent to respond to a vegetation fire by 12:09 pm that started near Cottonwood Campground. While the specific cause is under investigation, officials have determined the fire is not naturally caused and is of human origin.

== Progression ==
A Wireless Emergency Alert was sent to residents in the mountain cabin community of HiLo by Beaver County, advising residents to evacuate, with the message issued by 12:14 pm. State Route 153 was closed and the fire was reported at 50 acres (20 ha). Evacuations were ordered for HiLo and Eagle Point Resort. Multiple aerial and ground resources were responding to the fire. The fire had grown to at least 750 acres (300 ha) by 7 pm and at 7:30 pm, evacuation notices were expanded to include Merchant Valley. Merchant Valley residents were ordered to evacuate at 9 pm and Utah Fire Info reported the Cottonwood Fire to be 4,000 acres (1,600 ha). Arrowhead Summer Homes was added to the evacuation order area as the fire grew to 10,000 acres (4,000 ha) that night and continuing to grow all night. The fire was to 24,100 acres (9,800 ha) by the next morning. 160 structures were threatened. The Cottonwood Fire began producing several pyrocumulonimbus clouds as it was growing The wildfire surpassed to 27,000 acres (11,000 ha) and soon 31,000 acres (13,000 ha).

By June 24, the fire had reached about 61,000 acres (25,000 ha). A particularly dangerous situation was issued by the National Weather Service Salt Lake City for five counties, including the area of the active Cottonwood Fire. The fire was then confirmed number one priority in Utah with crews focused on protecting Circleville. Marysvale was placed in a level one "ready" evacuation status. Officials confirmed Eagle Point Resort was heavily damaged by the fire, as it had "tore through many condos and cabins" with many structures destroyed in the general area. A security camera video from a house showed the fire actively burning down the resort.

Circleville and Junction were placed under a level one "ready" evacuation status the next day. That afternoon, aerial operations were temporarily suspended due to significant smoke and wind. The fire surpassed 70,000 acres (28,000 ha) by that morning and had continued growing all afternoon and night, mostly several miles to the north in the North Fork Drainage with extreme fire behavior and spread, much like what was observed in the fire's first days. In result, crews had to disengage from the battling the fire as well as it was too dangerous. Fire had reached Delano peak running up the mountain, and more was focused near and all around Mount Belknap. Piute County Emergency Management lifted the level one "ready” evacuation status for Circleville and Junction. A community meeting was held at Piute High School at 7 pm.

The fire had surpassed 92,000 acres still with zero percent containment on the morning of June 27, with more red flag conditions expected that day. Direct extinguishment strategies throughout the fire parameter in several places were also utilized, which included the strengthening of dozer and hand lines, in an effort to slow the fire's spread, as it had moderated due to slightly higher humidity and some cloud cover. 1,200 resources were working the fire. Higher humidity levels helped moderate fire conditions despite strong winds gusting up to 55 miles per hour (89 km/h). On June 28, officials led residents in Piute County to retrieve camp trailers.

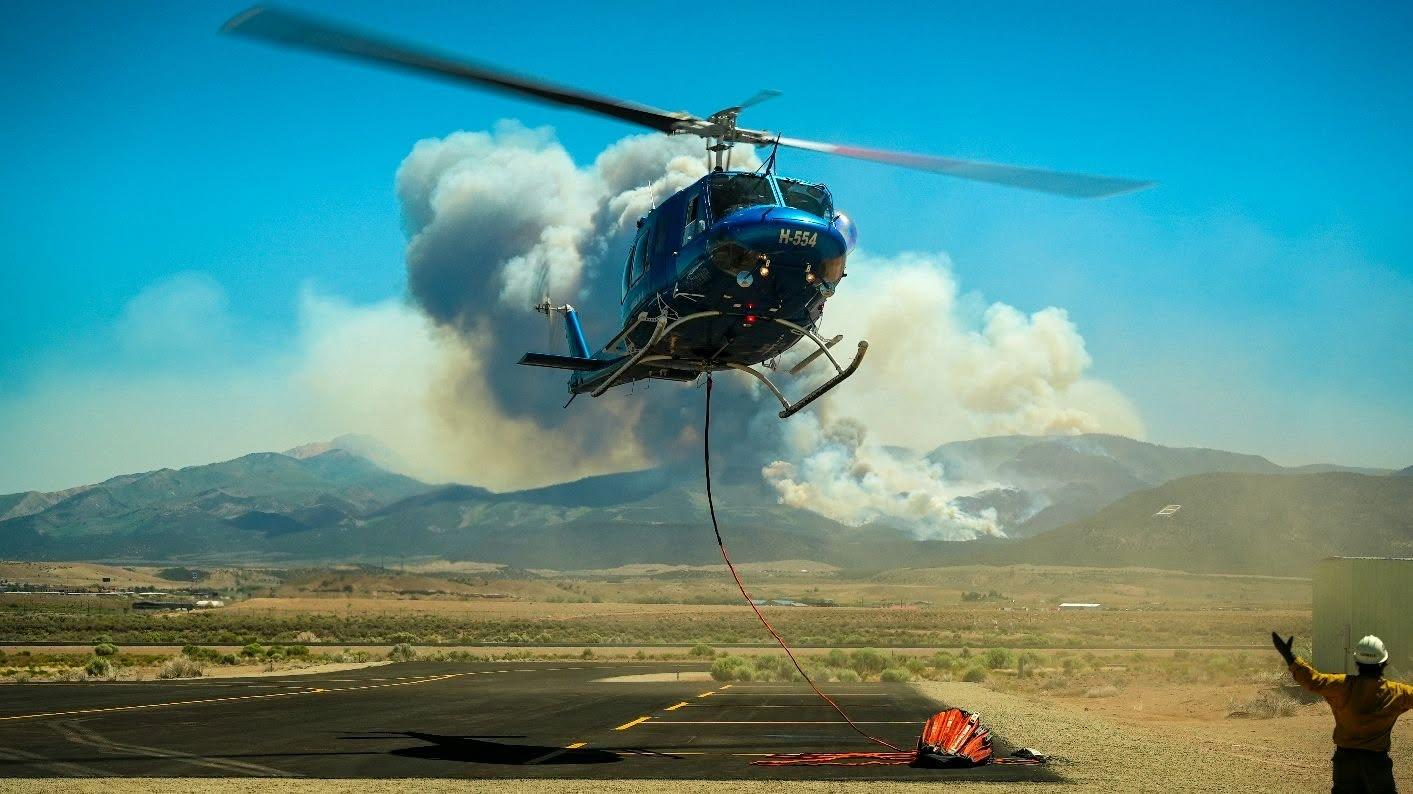
Smoke from the Cottonwood Fire behind a firefighting helicopter on June 29

The fire spread to 93,918 acres (38,007 ha) on June 29. Helicopters were combatting areas inaccessible by foot due to terrain. Decreased fire activity overnight allowed crews to begin laying a hose lay around portions of the Cottonwood Fire's perimeter, with crews prioritizing structure protection near LeBaron Meadows and Kents Lake. The fire reached 4% containment. The fire reached 5% containment on June 30 and a community meeting was held at Piute High School.

On July 1, containment on the Cottonwood Fire increased to 19%. Crews focused on building a dozer line between Mount Baldy and Cork Ridge as the fire was still moving to the west. North Creek and Manderfield were placed on set evacuation status while the ready evacuation status was lifted for Marysvale, Junction, and Circleville on July 2. Containment increased to 23%. The fire surpassed 94,000 acres on the morning of July 3, with most of this growth on its western edge. The fire reached 42% containment on July 4.

Containment had reached 47% by July 5, just as the fire surpassed 95,000 acres, with still over 1,000 personnel assigned and continuing their direct stratigies. And in the coming days, control of the fire was more established, with minimal growth to a few hundred acres a day decreasing even more as containment kept increasing, which had made it past 70% by July 12 and then 90% by July 18th.

== Effects ==
Heavy smoke from the Cottonwood Fire on June 23 as viewed from a satellite impacting much of Eastern Utah and west-central Colorado.

While crews are just starting to conduct comprehensive damage assessments, crews have confirmed Eagle Point Resort has sustained significant structural damage and Governor Spencer Cox has stated, "there's a very good chance that this is already the most destructive fire in the state's history." ABC News stated, "ranchers reported finding dead cattle strewn across burned grazing land", and the Utah agriculture commissioner stated it would take "years" for ranchers to recover from the fire. The fire has prompted evacuation orders for Eagle Point Resort, the HiLo Estates, Merchant Valley, and Arrowhead Summer Homes and "ready" evacuation notices for Marysvale, Circleville, and Junction. Power outages are occurring across Piute County. Eagle Point Resort is closed and will remain closed in the future due to significant damage. State Route 153 and several forest roads are closed, along with large portions of Fishlake National Forest. The forest closure will remain in place until December 31, 2026 unless rescinded due to better conditions. The Cottonwood Fire has significantly impacted air quality across multiple states outside of Utah, with numerous reports of poor air quality and smoke visibility in Moab and Colorado. A Red Cross shelter was set up in the Beaver armory for anyone who needed assistance evacuating from the fire.

The fire has also partly contributed to a statewide fireworks ban issued by the governor due to a wildfire outbreak throughout the state before forth of July, causing some backlash among the people who live in the state. The Fourth of July celebration in Beaver was cancelled as well.

Peak air quality from June 27 – July 6
City	June 27	June 28	June 29	June 30	July 1	July 2	July 3	July 4	July 5	July 6
Salina	—N/a	M.								
Richfield	M.		G.	M.						
Marysvale	U.S.G.	M.		U.S.G.	U.	U.S.G.			M.	
Koosharem	M.	G.	M.							
Junction	G.	U.S.G.	M.	U.S.G.		M.				
Beaver	—N/a	M.		U.	U.S.G.		U.			

== Growth and containment table ==
Fire containment status Gray: contained; Red: active; %: percent contained;
Date	Area burned	Personnel	Containment
June 22	10,000 acres (4,000 ha)	Unknown	
June 23	31,000 acres (13,000 ha)	Unknown	
June 24	59,613 acres (24,125 ha)	Unknown	
June 25	70,992 acres (28,729 ha)	Unknown	
June 26	71,841 acres (29,073 ha)	658	
June 27	93,607 acres (37,881 ha)	1,200	
June 28	93,607 acres (37,881 ha)	1,200	
June 29	93,918 acres (38,007 ha)	1,200	
June 30	93,918 acres (38,007 ha)	1,200	
July 1	93,918 acres (38,007 ha)	1,204	
July 2	93,918 acres (38,007 ha)	1,222	
July 3	93,918 acres (38,007 ha)	1,273	
July 4	94,417 acres (38,209 ha)	1,305	
July 5	94,768 acres (38,351 ha)	1,289	
July 6	95,807 acres (38,772 ha)	1,289	
July 7	95,934 acres (38,823 ha)	1,252	
July 8	96,333 acres (38,985 ha)	1,249	
July 9	96,343 acres (38,989 ha)	1,172	
July 10	97,130 acres (39,310 ha)	1,175	
July 11	97,278 acres (39,367 ha)	1,043	
July 12	97,373 acres (39,405 ha)	1,040	
July 13	97,455 acres (39,439 ha)	906	
July 14	97,458 acres (39,440 ha)	894	
July 15	97,458 acres (39,440 ha)	799	
July 16	97,458 acres (39,440 ha)	758	
July 18	97,464 acres (39,442 ha)	542	

== See also ==
- 2026 United States wildfires
- 2026 Utah wildfires
- Babylon Fire – 2026 wildfire in Utah
- Snyder Fire – 2026 wildfire on the Colorado–Utah border
