= Middle Fork Cimarron River =

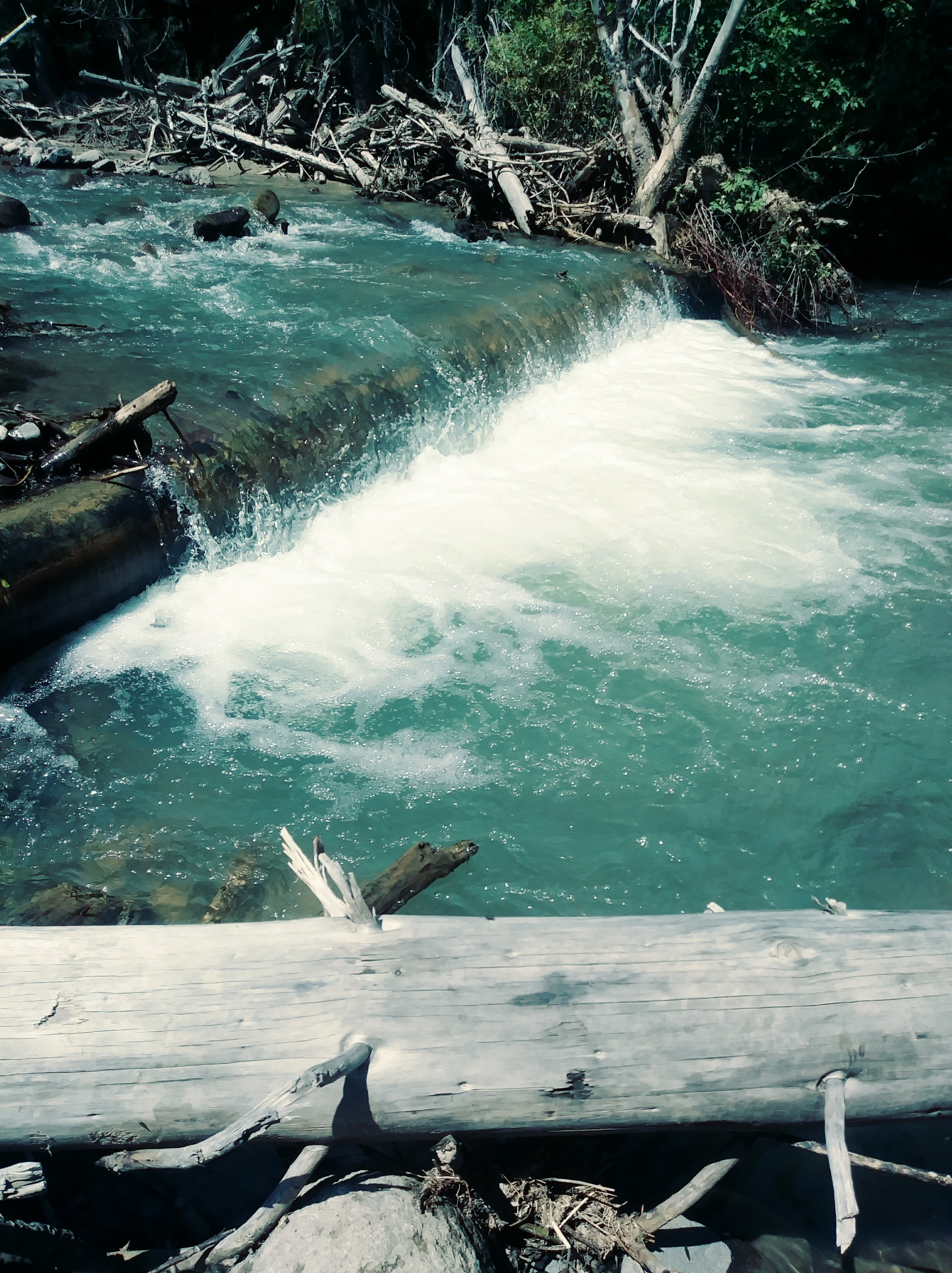
- Middle Fork of the Cimarron River, in the Uncompahgre Wilderness

Physical characteristics
- Source
  - coordinates: 38°04′34″N 107°31′09″W
- Mouth
  - location: Confluence with East Fork
  - coordinates: 38°12′15″N 107°31′07″W
  - elevation: 9,022 ft (2,750 m)

Basin features
- Progression: Cimarron—Gunnison—Colorado

Middle Fork Cimarron River is a 10.3-mile-long (16.6 km) tributary of the Cimarron River in Colorado. The river's source is east of Coxcomb Peak in the Uncompahgre Wilderness of Hinsdale County. It joins the East Fork Cimarron River in Gunnison County to form the Cimarron River, and is impounded by Silver Jack Dam.

== See also ==
- List of rivers of Colorado
- List of tributaries of the Colorado River
