= Silver Jack Dam =

Dam in Gunnison County, Colorado, United States

Coordinates: 38°13′55″N 107°32′32″W

Silver Jack Dam (NID #CO01693) is a dam in Gunnison County, Colorado.

The earthen dam was constructed between 1966 and 1971 by the United States Bureau of Reclamation, with a height of 173 feet (53 m), 1,050 feet (320 m) long at its crest, and a morning glory spillway. It impounds the East Fork Cimarron River for irrigation storage, as the main part of the larger Bostwick Park Project on the Western Slope. The dam is owned by the Bureau and operated by the local Bostwick Park Water Conservancy District.

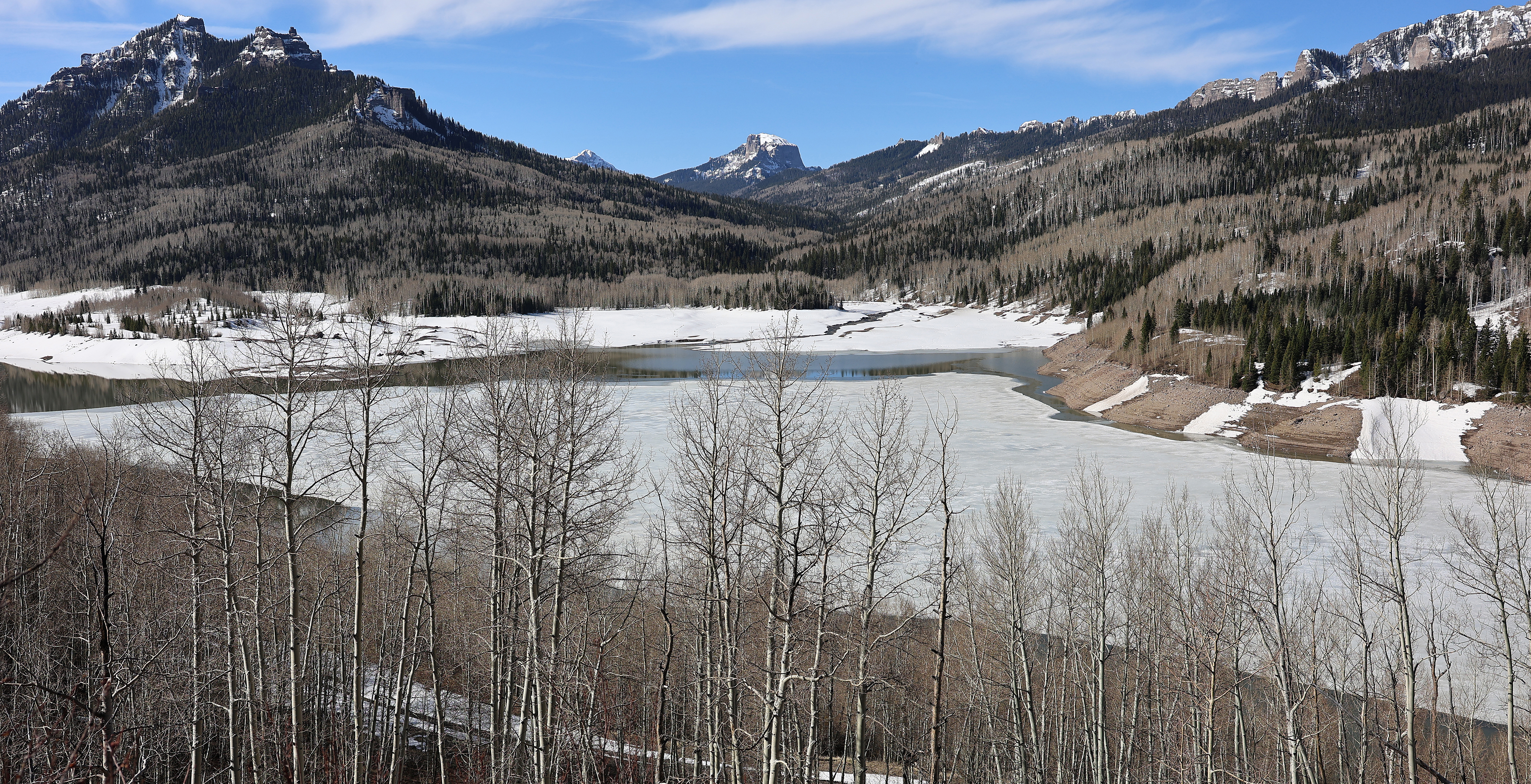
Part of the reservoir in April 2025

The reservoir it creates, Silver Jack Reservoir, has a normal water surface of 293 acres (119 ha), a normal elevation of 2,671 metres (8,763 ft) and a maximum capacity of 12,820 acre-feet (15,810,000 m^{3}). Recreation includes fishing, camping, boating, hunting, and hiking.
