= Hurricane Peak =

Mountain in the state of Colorado

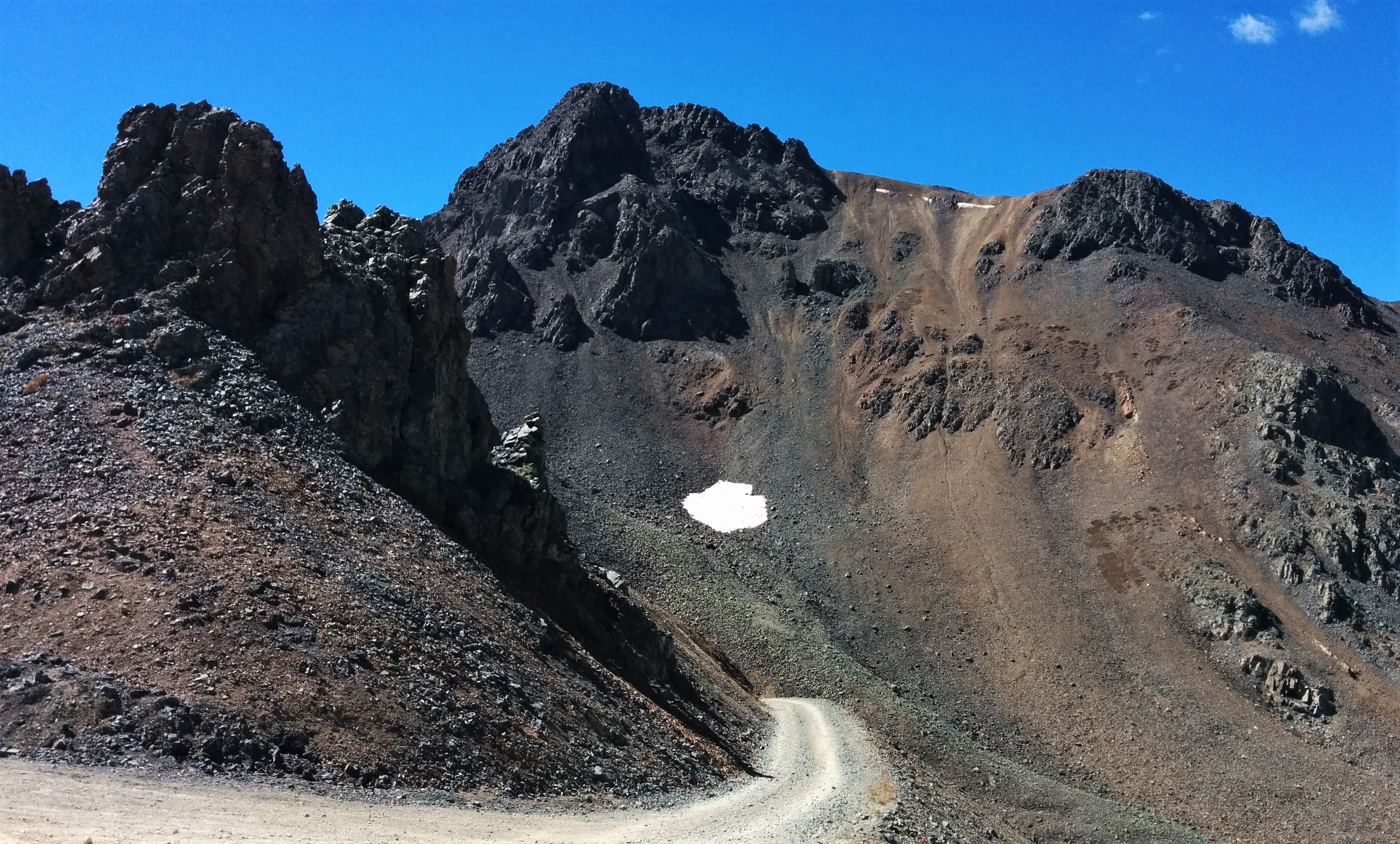
- Northeast aspect

Highest point
- Elevation: 13,447 ft (4,099 m)
- Prominence: 247 ft (75 m)
- Parent peak: Hanson Peak (13,454 ft)
- Isolation: 0.79 mi (1.27 km)
- Coordinates: 37°54′53″N 107°37′17″W

Geography
- Location within Colorado Location within the United States
- Location: San Juan County; Colorado, US
- Parent range: Rocky Mountains; San Juan Mountains
- Topo map: USGS Handies Peak

Geology
- Rock type: Extrusive rock

Climbing
- Easiest route: class 2 hiking

Hurricane Peak is a 13,447-foot-elevation (4,099-meter) mountain summit located in San Juan County of southwest Colorado, United States. It is situated equidistant between the historic towns of Ouray and Silverton, and is approximately nine miles west of the Continental Divide. It is part of the San Juan Mountains which are a subset of the Rocky Mountains. Topographic relief is significant as the north aspect rises 1,200 feet (370 meters) above Lake Como in one-half mile. Neighbors include Abrams Mountain 3.4 miles to the north, Red Mountain 2.2 miles to the west, and Tuttle Mountain 1.4 mile to the north. The Mountain Queen Mine, which is located on the east slope of Hurricane Peak at the head of California Gulch, is one of the oldest workings in the area and was most active from 1878 to 1880. The mountain's name, which has been officially adopted by the United States Board on Geographic Names, was in use in 1906 when Henry Gannett published it in the Gazetteer of Colorado.

== Climate ==
According to the Köppen climate classification system, Hurricane Peak is located in an alpine subarctic climate zone with cold, snowy winters, and cool to warm summers. Due to its altitude, it receives precipitation all year, as snow in winter, and as thunderstorms in summer, with a dry period in late spring. Precipitation runoff from the mountain drains into tributaries of the Animas and Uncompahgre Rivers.

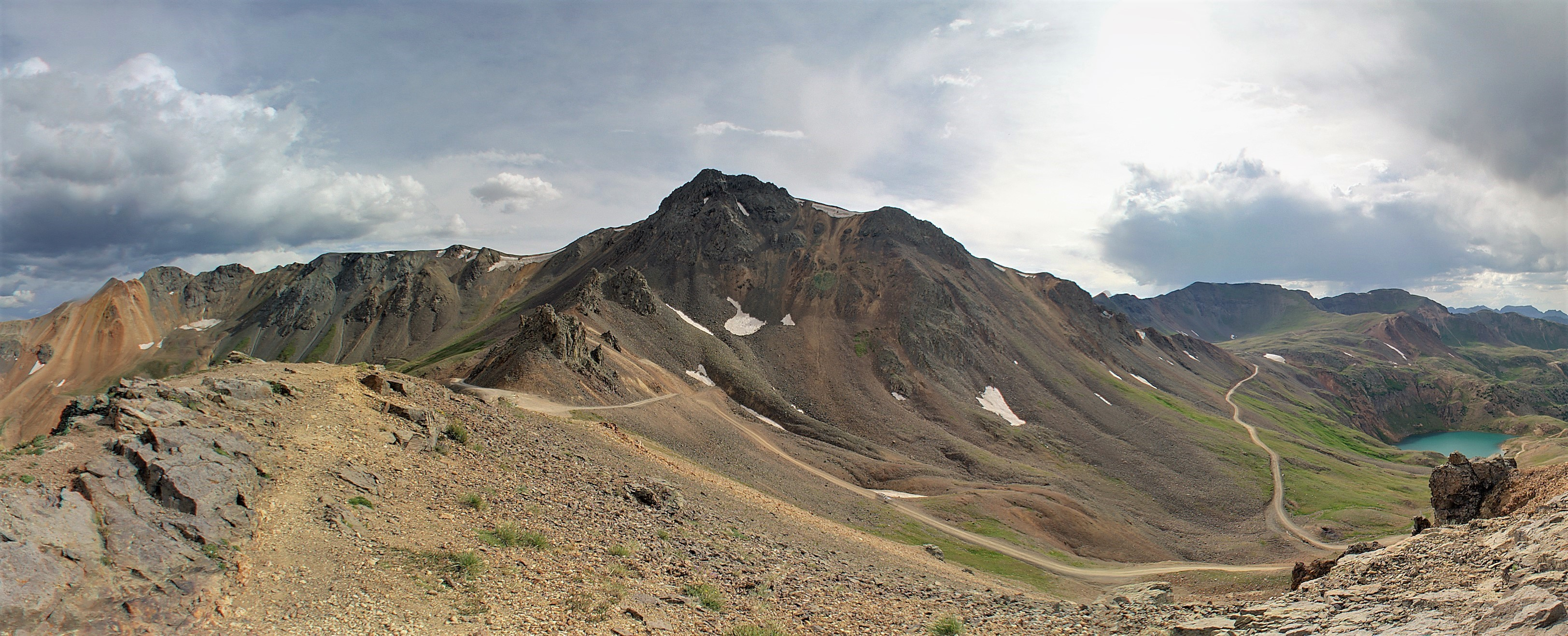
Hurricane Peak, northeast aspect. Lake Como to the right.

== See also ==
- Mountains of San Juan County, Colorado
- Brown Mountain
