= Wildhorse Peak =

Mountain in the state of Colorado

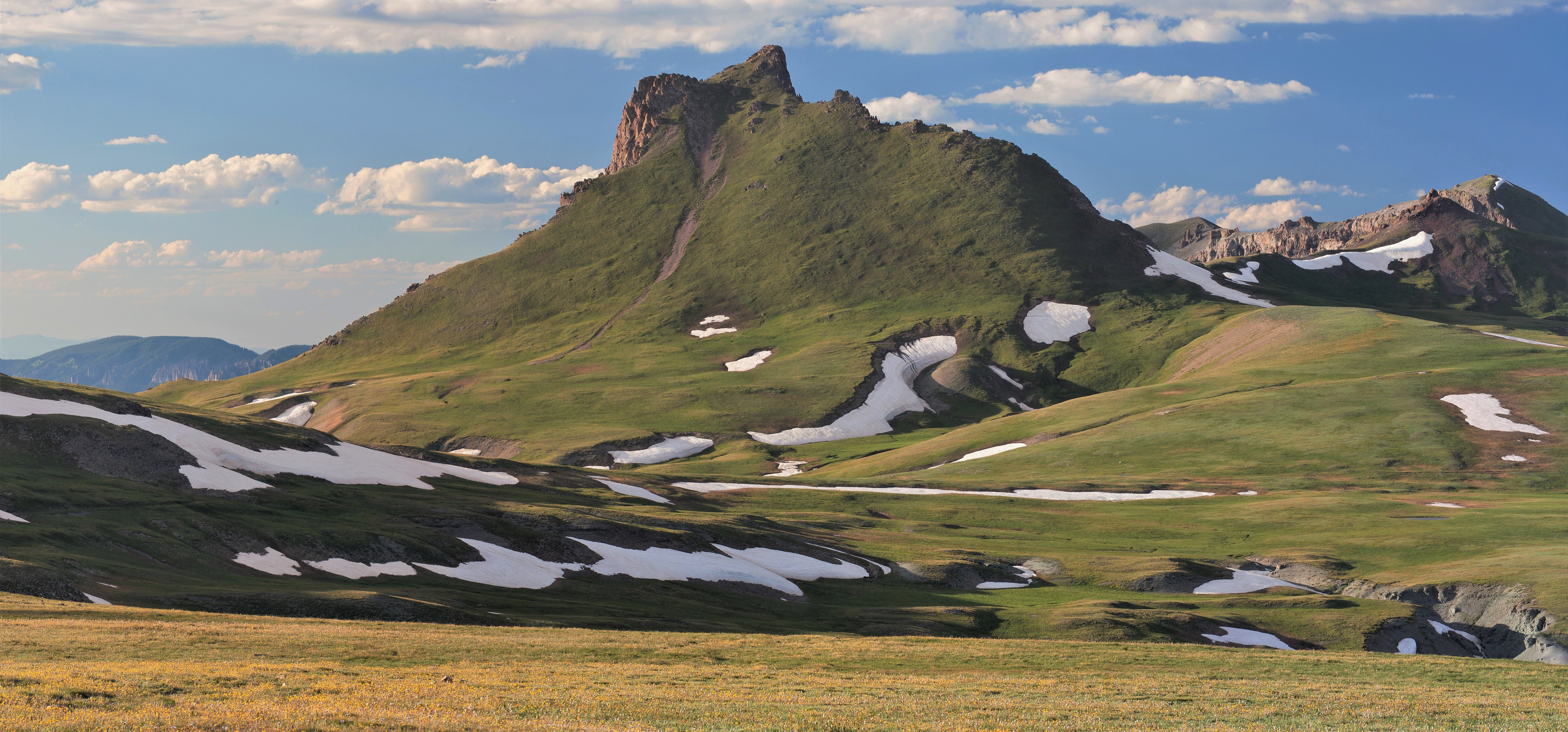
- South aspect, from American Flats

Highest point
- Elevation: 13,266 ft (4,043 m)
- Prominence: 946 ft (288 m)
- Parent peak: Sunshine Mountain (13,321 ft)
- Isolation: 3.94 mi (6.34 km)
- Coordinates: 38°00′48″N 107°34′39″W

Geography
- Location within Colorado Location within the United States
- Location: Ouray County; Colorado, US
- Parent range: Rocky Mountains; San Juan Mountains
- Topo map: USGS Wetterhorn Peak

Geology
- Rock type(s): tuff, quartz-biotite latite

Climbing
- First ascent: 1899
- Easiest route: class 2 South slope

Wildhorse Peak is a 13,266-foot-elevation (4,043-meter) mountain summit located in Ouray County, of Colorado, United States. It is situated five miles east of the community of Ouray, in the Uncompahgre Wilderness, on land managed by Uncompahgre National Forest. It is part of the San Juan Mountains which are a subset of the Rocky Mountains, and is situated west of the Continental Divide. Neighbors include Darley Mountain 2.2 miles to the south, and Abrams Mountain five miles to the southwest. This distinctive peak abruptly rises 1,000 feet above the alpine tundra of American Flats, and topographic relief is significant as the northwest aspect rises 1,600 feet (490 meters) above Wildhorse Creek in less than one mile. The peak can be seen from Montrose and Highway 550. The first ascent of the summit was made August 25, 1899, by Eli Stanton, F. H. Stanton, and William Killen. The mountain's name, which has been officially adopted by the United States Board on Geographic Names, was in use in 1906 when Henry Gannett published it in A Gazetteer of Colorado.

== Climate ==
According to the Köppen climate classification system, Wildhorse Peak is located in an alpine subarctic climate zone with cold, snowy winters, and cool to warm summers. Due to its altitude, it receives precipitation all year, as snow in winter, and as thunderstorms in summer, with a dry period in late spring. Precipitation runoff from the mountain drains into headwaters of Wildhorse Creek and Cow Creek, which are tributaries of the Uncompahgre River.

== Gallery ==
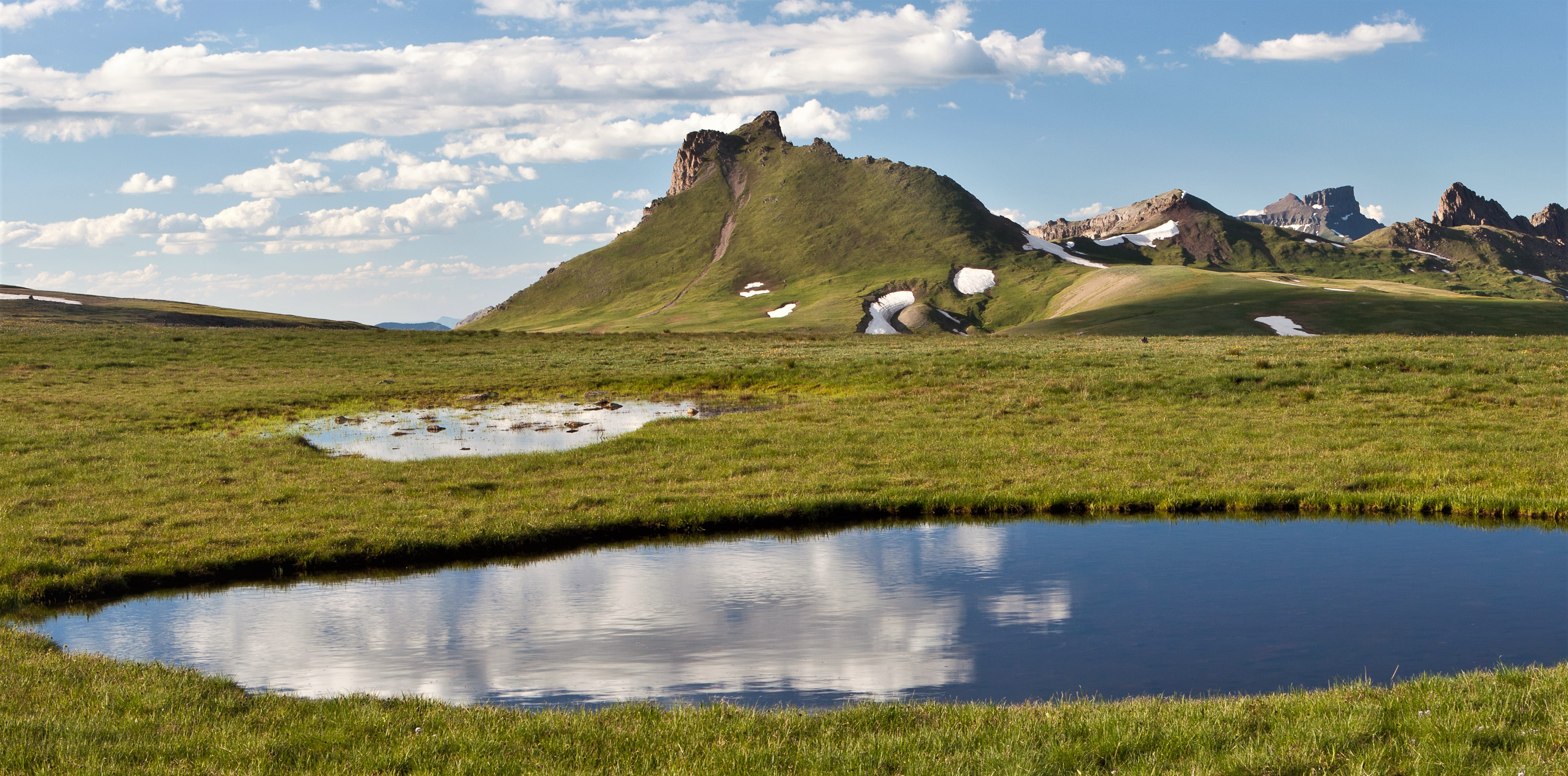

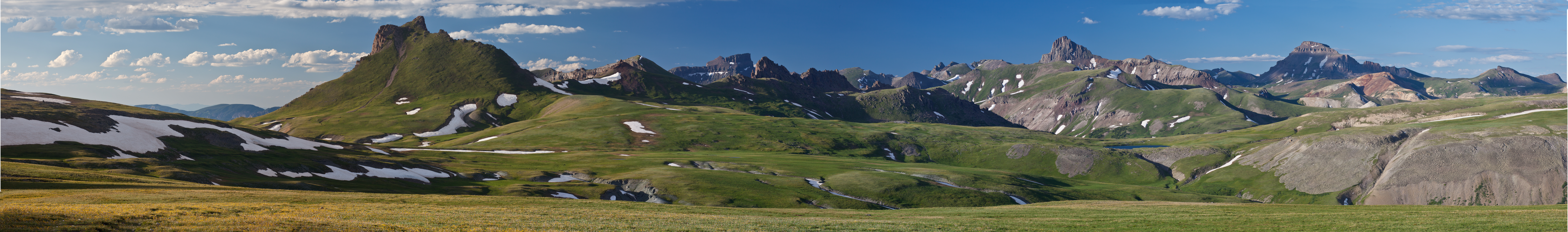

== See also ==
- Mountains of Ouray County, Colorado
