= Abrams Mountain =

Mountain in the state of Colorado

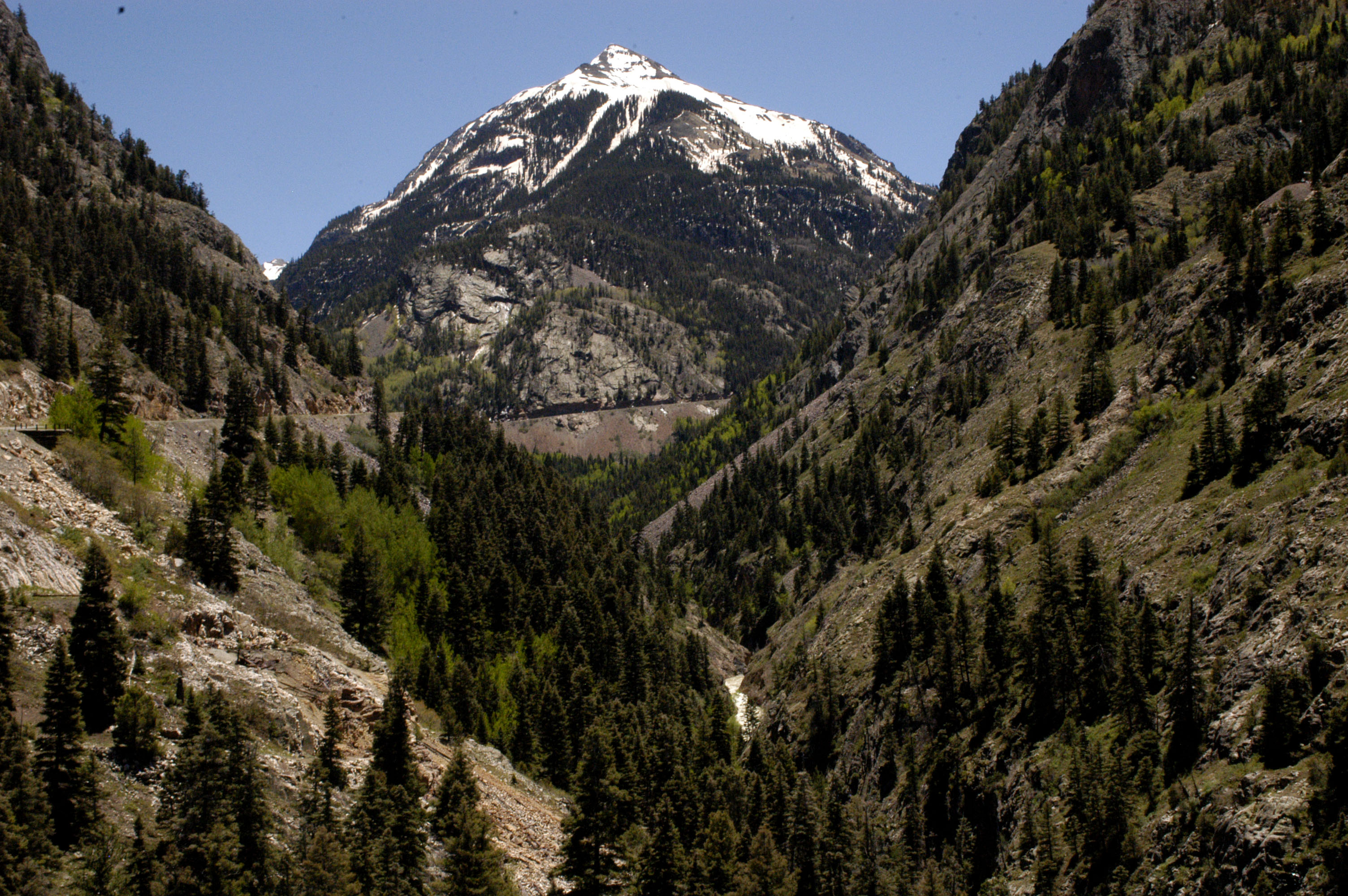
- North aspect

Highest point
- Elevation: 12,801 ft (3,902 m)
- Prominence: 361 ft (110 m)
- Parent peak: Brown Mountain (13,347 ft)
- Isolation: 2.47 mi (3.98 km)
- Coordinates: 37°57′44″N 107°38′26″W

Naming
- Etymology: Abram Cutler

Geography
- Location within Colorado Location within the United States
- Location: Ouray County / San Juan County; Colorado, US
- Parent range: Rocky Mountains; San Juan Mountains
- Topo map: USGS Ironton

Geology
- Rock type: Extrusive rock

Climbing
- Easiest route: class 2 hiking

Abrams Mountain, also known as Mount Abram or Mount Abrams, is a 12,801-foot-elevation (3,902-meter) mountain summit located on the shared boundary of Ouray County with San Juan County in southwest Colorado, United States. It is situated four miles south of the town of Ouray, on land managed by Uncompahgre National Forest. It is part of the San Juan Mountains, which are a subset of the Rocky Mountains, and is west of the Continental Divide. Topographic relief is significant as the north aspect rises 3,800 feet (1,200 meters) above Uncompahgre Gorge in 1.5 mile. Historic mines are located on the slopes of Abrams Mountain. This iconic feature of the Ouray landscape can be seen for many miles while driving Highway 550 south from Montrose toward Ouray, and it dominates the San Juan Skyway from Red Mountain Pass to Ironton Park.

== Etymology ==
The mountain's name, which has been officially adopted by the United States Board on Geographic Names, was in use before 1906 when Henry Gannett published it in the Gazetteer of Colorado. The name commemorates Abram Cutler (born November 2, 1832), the first judge of Ouray County and notary public who administered the oath to Ouray's original town board. Originally a civil engineer, he assisted Ferdinand Vandeveer Hayden with the 1874 survey of this area, so the possibility exists that Hayden named the mountain to honor Cutler. The nearby Cutler Creek which is just north of Ouray was also named for Abram Cutler, and the Cutler Formation takes its name from the creek.

== Climate ==
According to the Köppen climate classification system, Abrams Mountain is located in an alpine subarctic climate zone with long, cold, snowy winters, and cool to warm summers. Due to its altitude, it receives precipitation all year, as snow in winter, and as thunderstorms in summer, with a dry period in late spring. Precipitation runoff from the mountain drains into the Uncompahgre River.

== Gallery ==
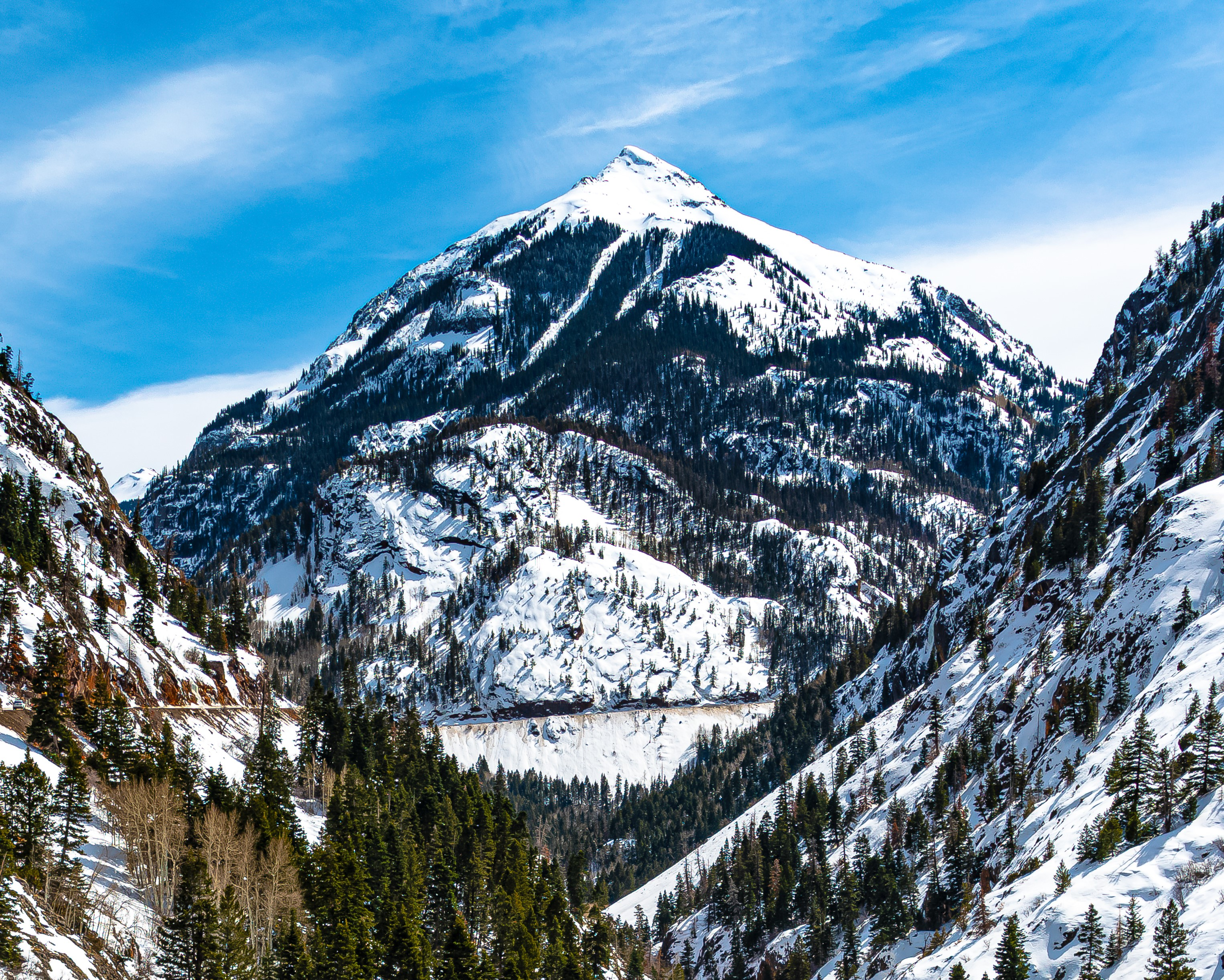
Abrams Mountain

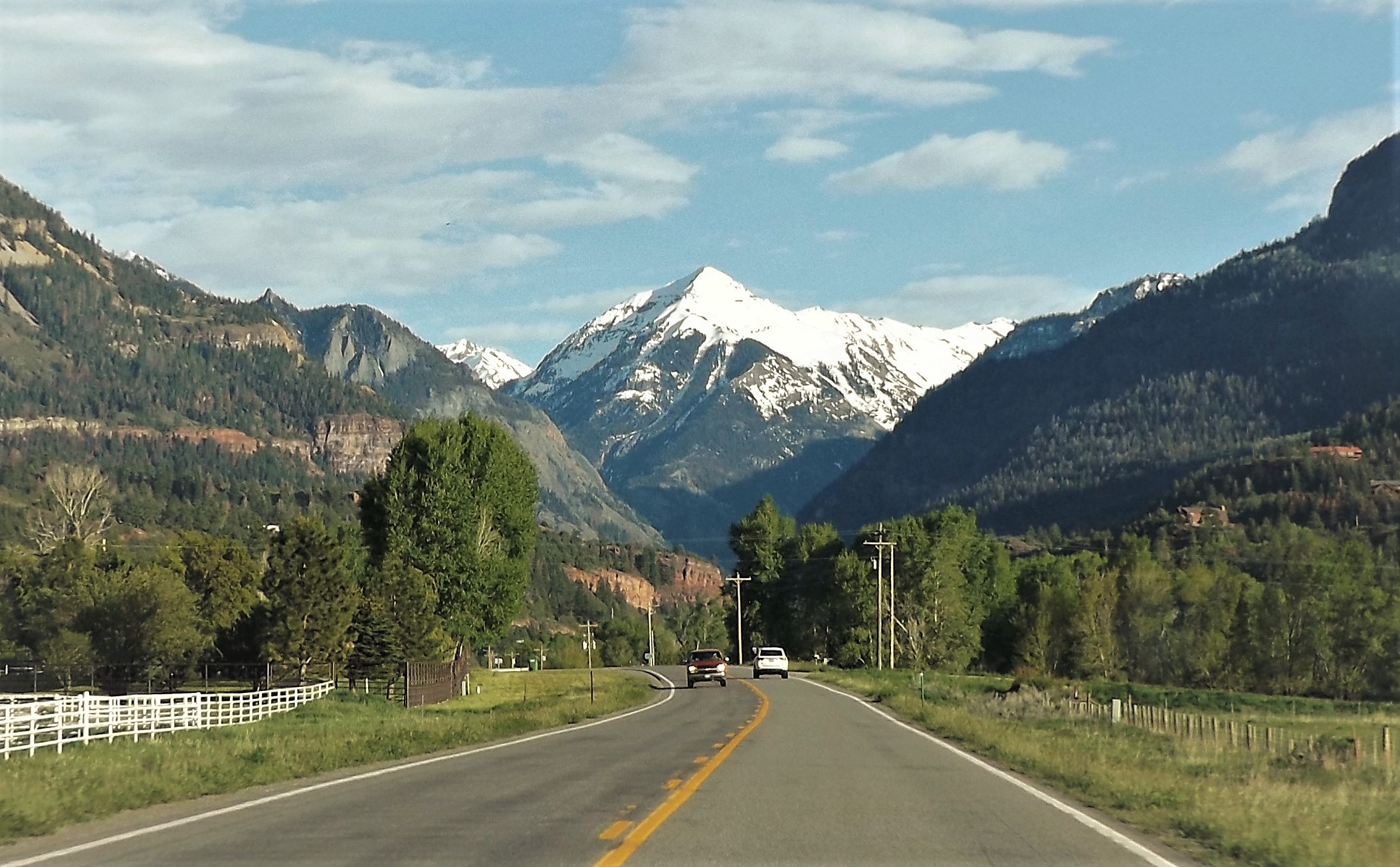
Abrams Mountain seen from southbound US Highway 550, approaching Ouray.

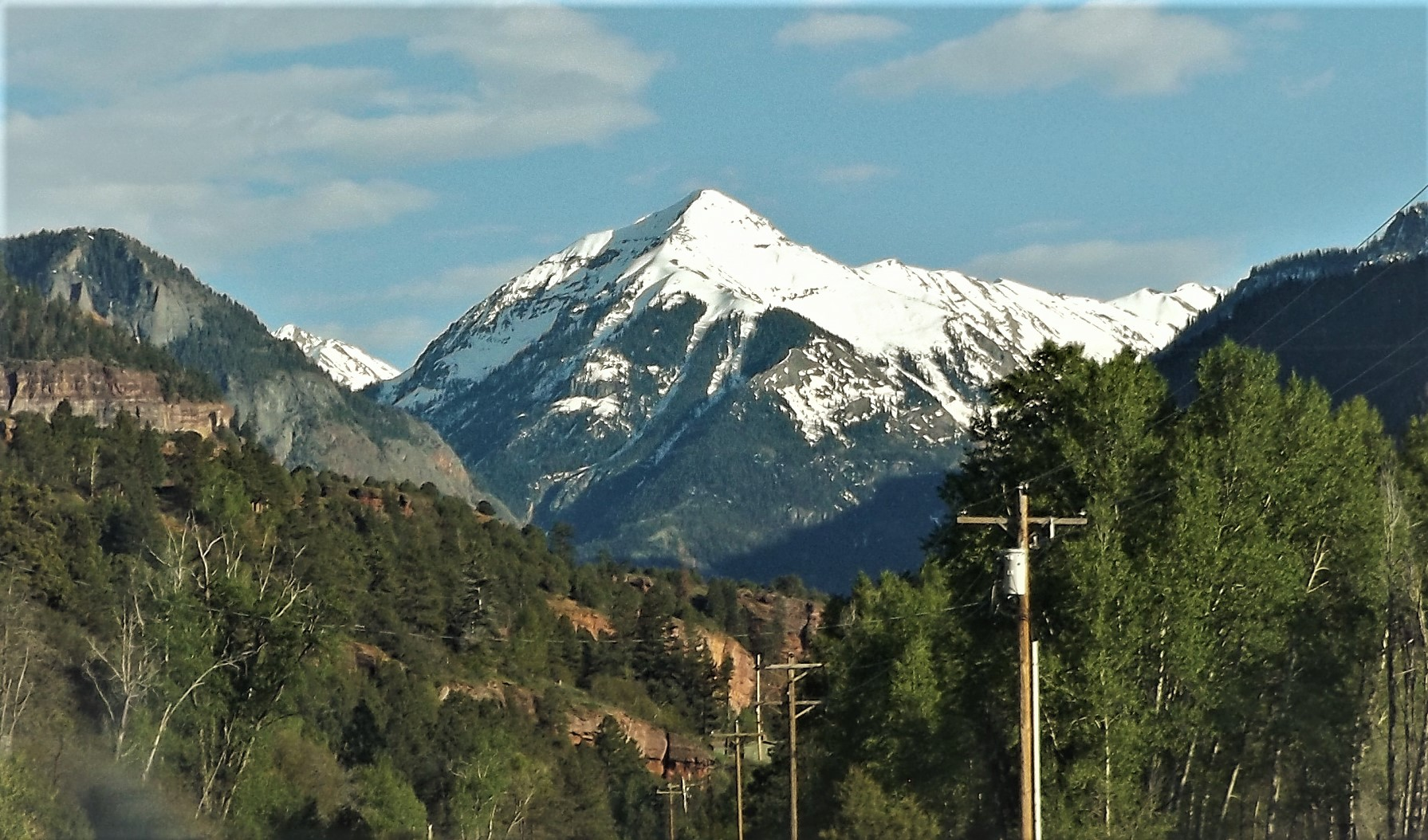
Abrams Mountain seen from southbound US Highway 550, approaching Ouray.

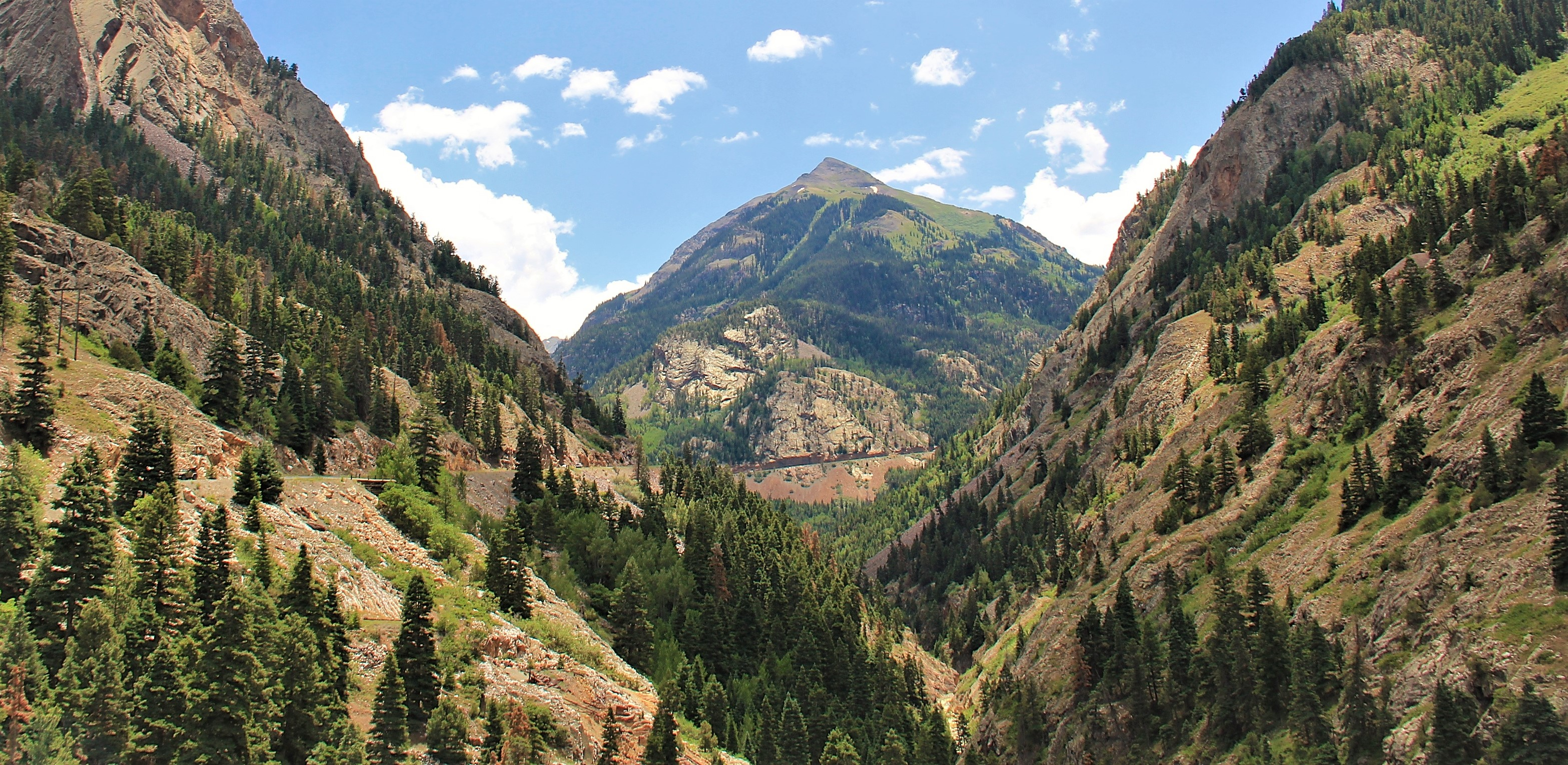
Abrams from Uncompahgre Gorge

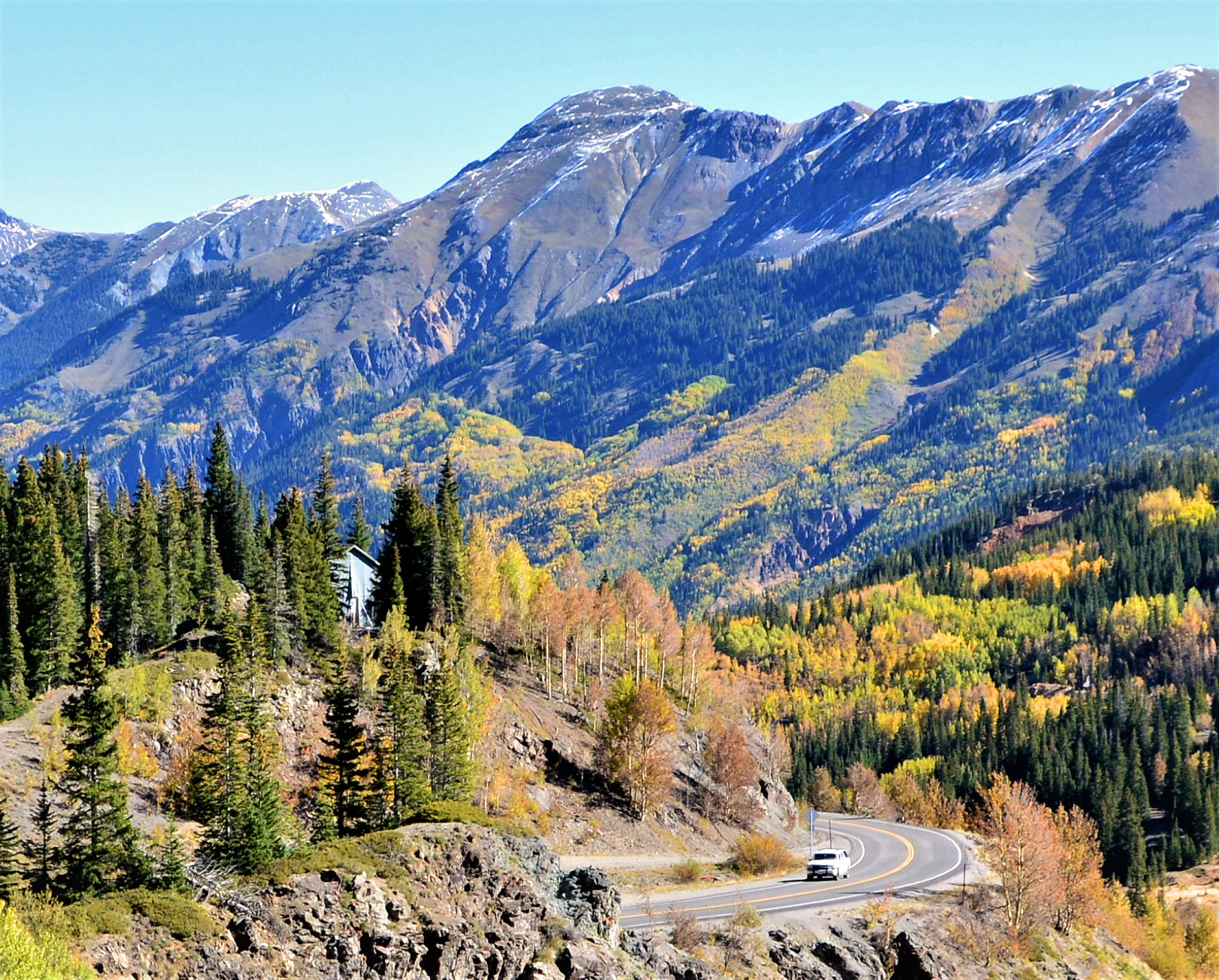
Southwest aspect from the Million Dollar Highway

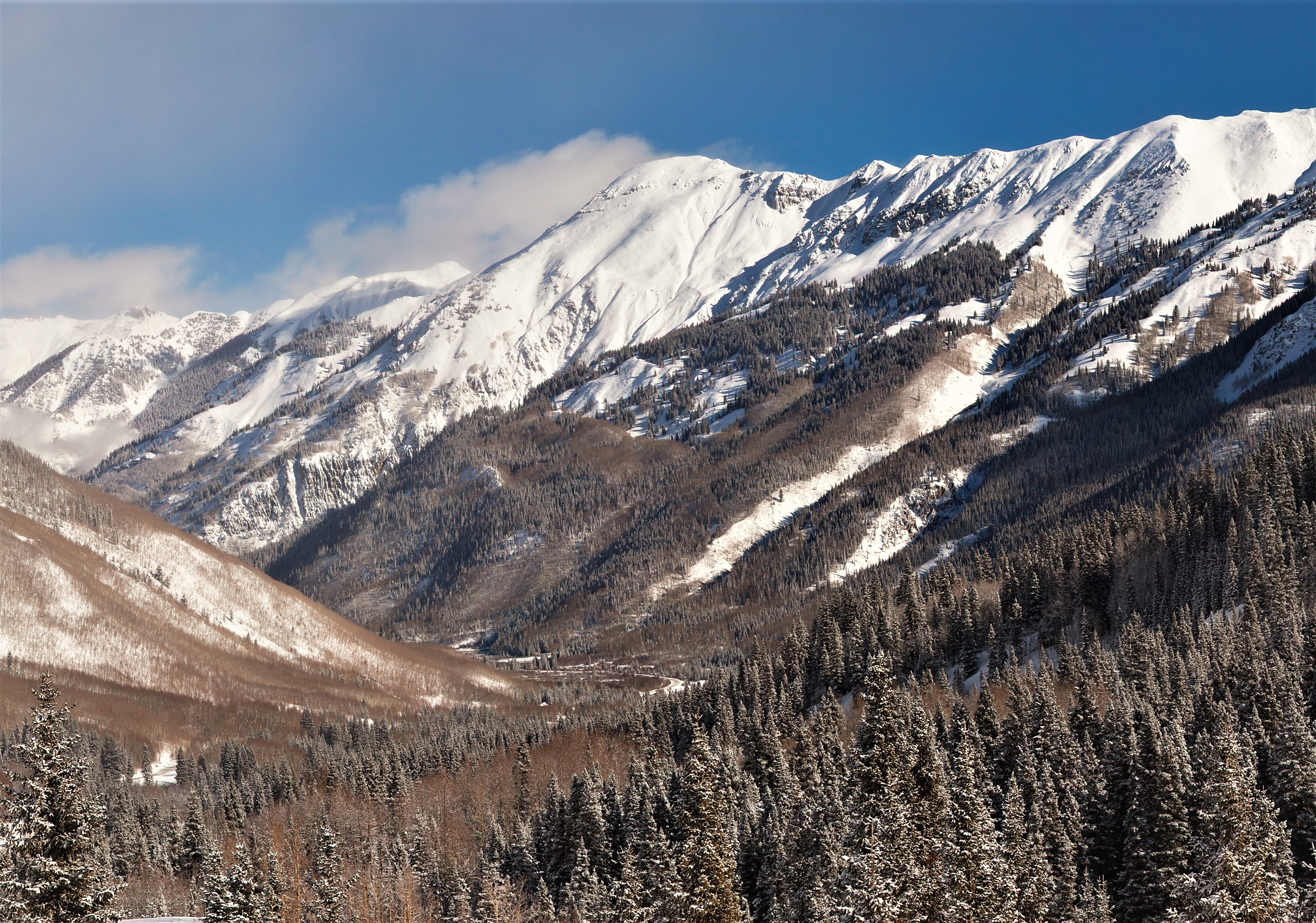
Southwest aspect of Abrams Mountain in winter

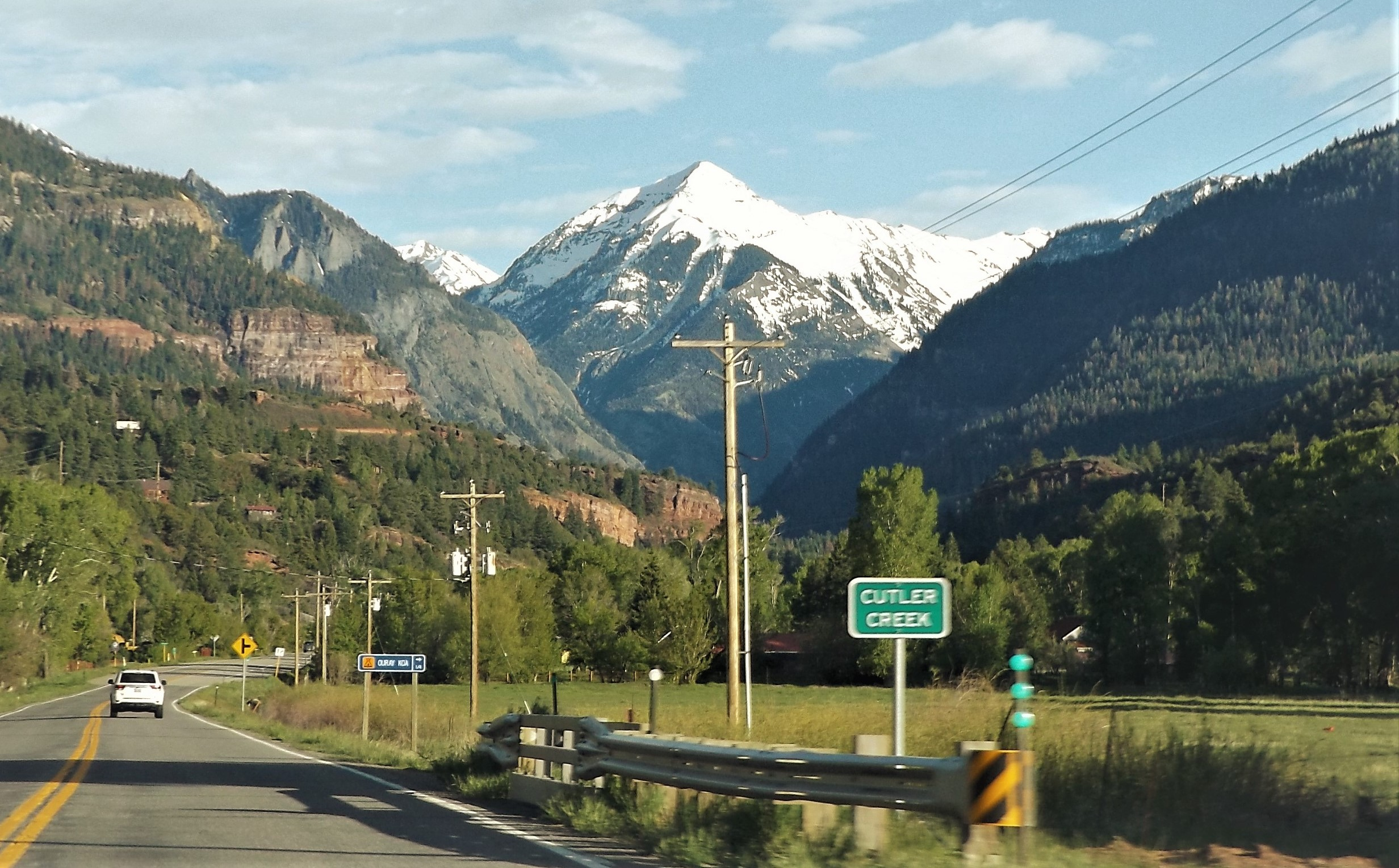
Abrams Mountain seen from Hwy 550 at Cutler Creek. Both the mountain and creek are named after Abram Cutler.

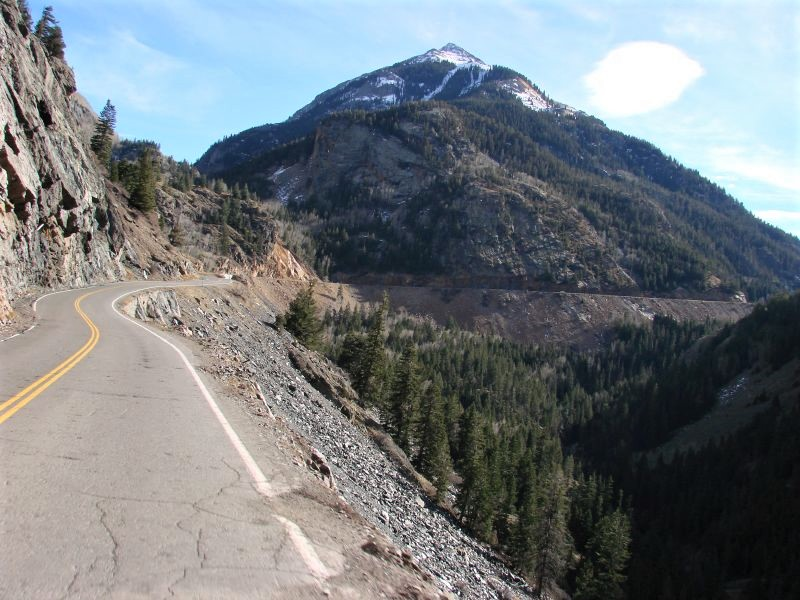
Abrams Mountain from the Million Dollar Highway

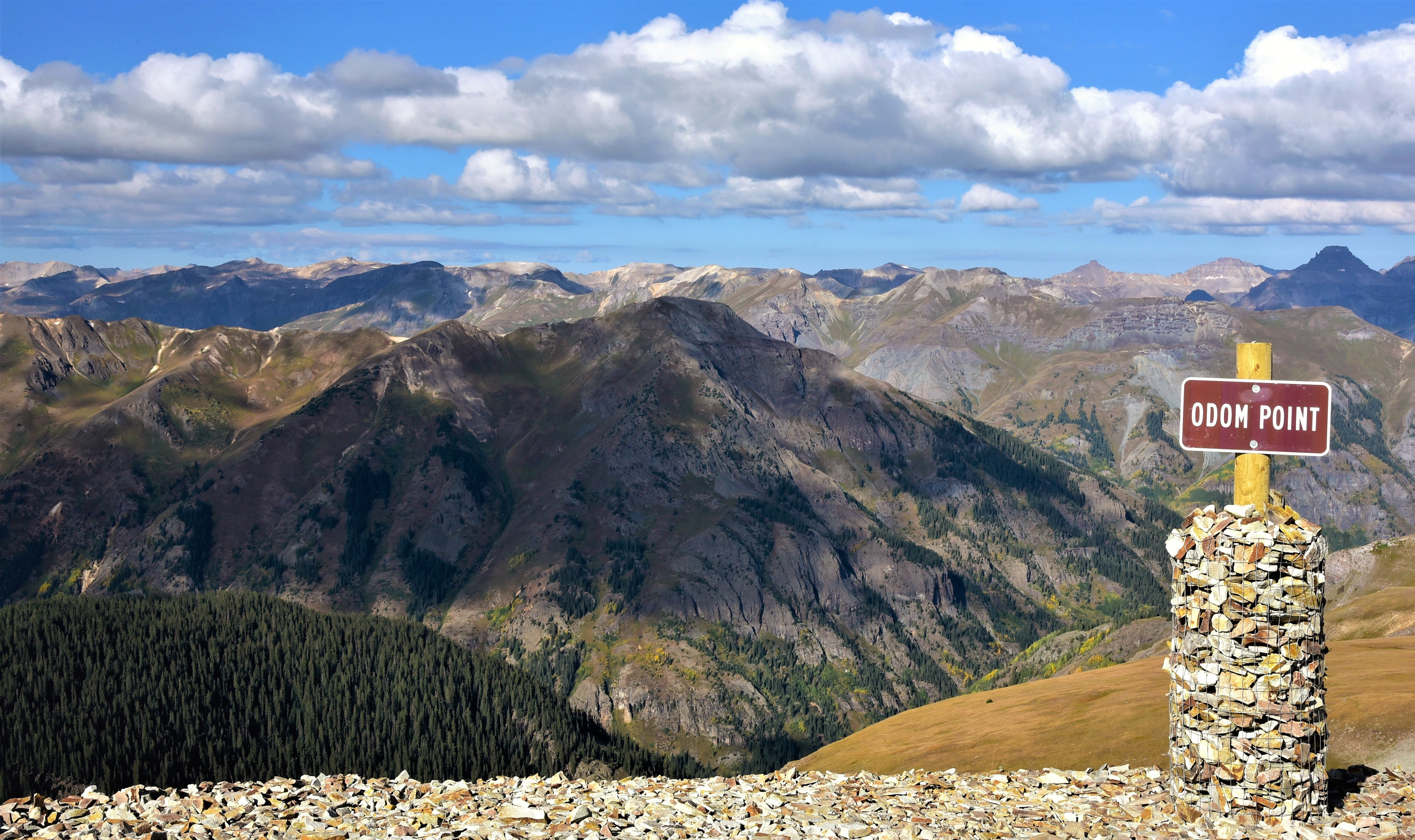
East aspect of Abrams Mountain (centered, shaded) viewed from Odom Point on Engineer Mountain

== See also ==
- Mountains of Ouray County, Colorado
