= Darley Mountain =

Mountain in Colorado, United States

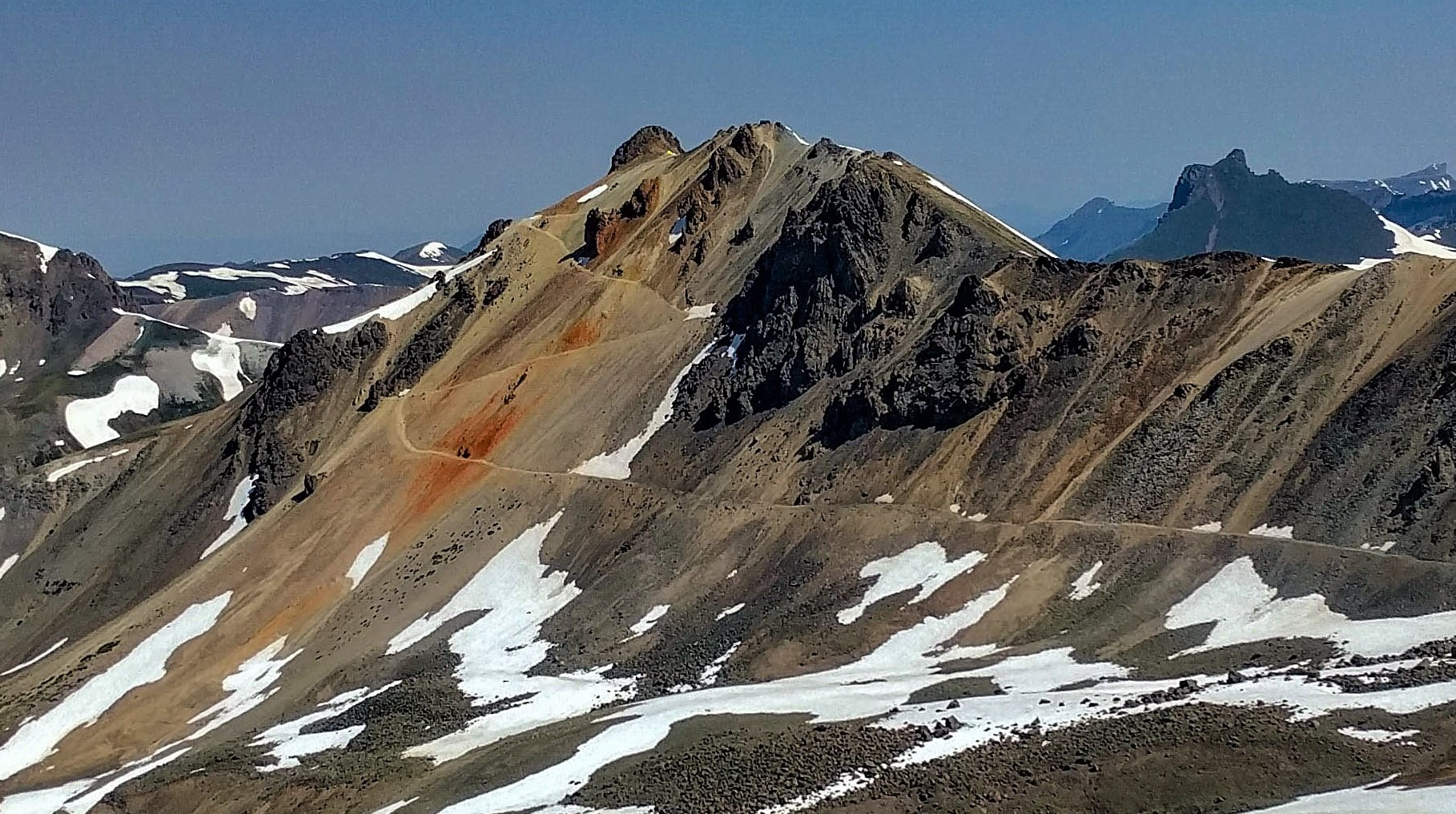
- Southwest aspect

Highest point
- Elevation: 13,260 ft (4,042 m)
- Prominence: 480 ft (150 m)
- Parent peak: Wildhorse Peak (13,266 ft)
- Isolation: 2.19 mi (3.52 km)
- Coordinates: 37°58′58″N 107°35′17″W

Naming
- Etymology: George M. Darley

Geography
- Location within Colorado Location within the United States
- Location: Hinsdale County / Ouray County; Colorado, US
- Parent range: Rocky Mountains; San Juan Mountains
- Topo map: USGS Handies Peak

Climbing
- Easiest route: class 2 hiking

Darley Mountain is a 13,260-foot-elevation (4,040-meter) mountain summit located on the shared boundary of Hinsdale County with Ouray County, in southwest Colorado, United States. It is situated five miles southeast of the community of Ouray, in the Uncompahgre Wilderness, on land managed by Uncompahgre National Forest. It is part of the San Juan Mountains which are a subset of the Rocky Mountains, and is west of the Continental Divide. Neighboring geographic features include Engineer Pass 0.6 mile to the southeast, Engineer Mountain 0.9 mile to the south, and nearest higher neighbor Wildhorse Peak 2.2 miles to the north. The mountain's name was officially adopted in 1992 by the United States Board on Geographic Names to commemorate George Marshall Darley (1847–1917), pioneering minister of the San Juan Mountains, who founded and built the first church in western Colorado in Lake City in 1876. Lake City is approximately 16 miles east of this mountain.

== Climate ==
According to the Köppen climate classification system, Darley Mountain is located in an alpine subarctic climate zone with cold, snowy winters, and cool to warm summers. Due to its altitude, it receives precipitation all year, as snow in winter, and as thunderstorms in summer, with a dry period in late spring. Precipitation runoff from the mountain's west aspect drains into the Uncompahgre River via Bear Creek, and from the east slope into Henson Creek which is a tributary of the Gunnison River.

== Gallery ==
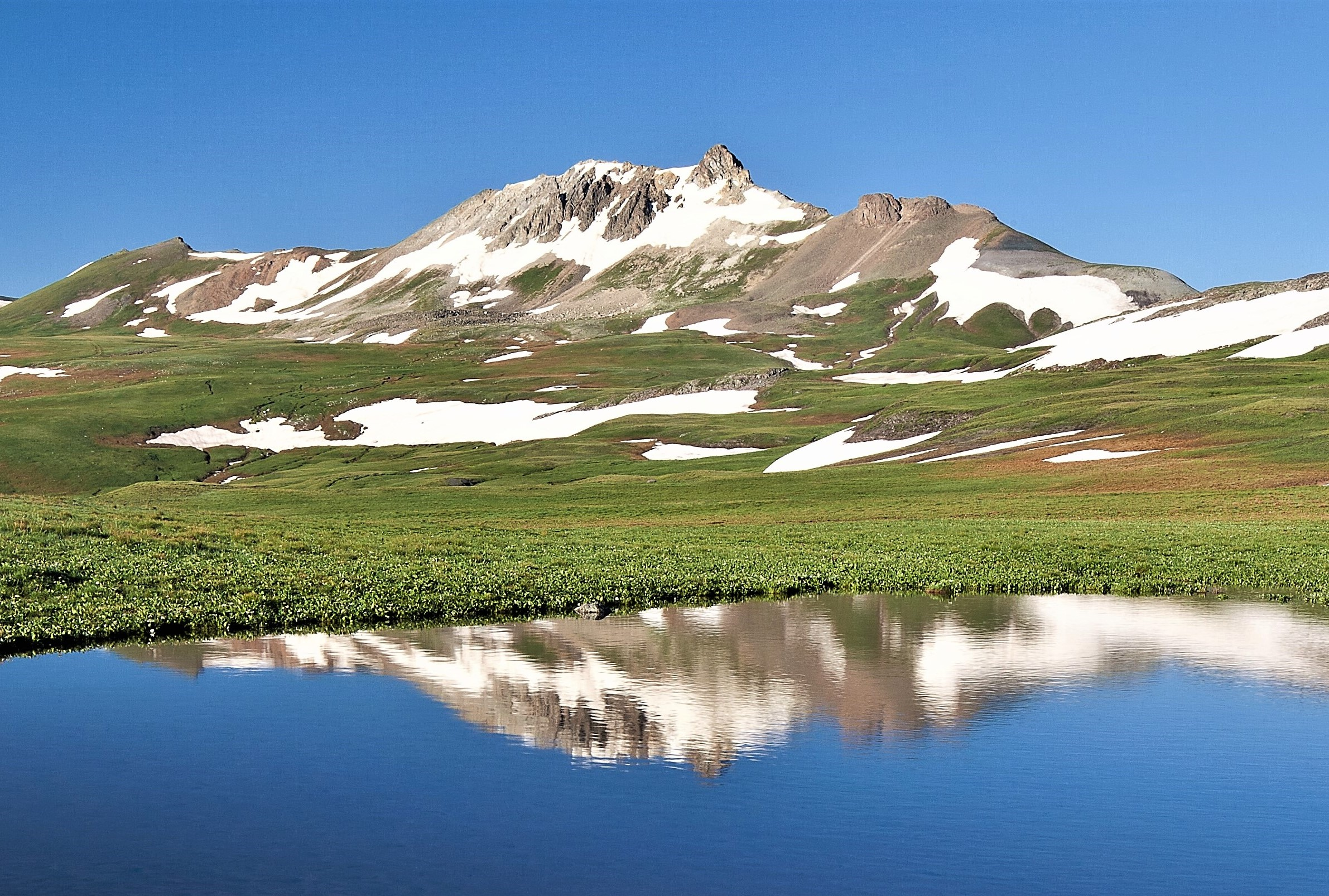
Northeast aspect reflected in American Lake

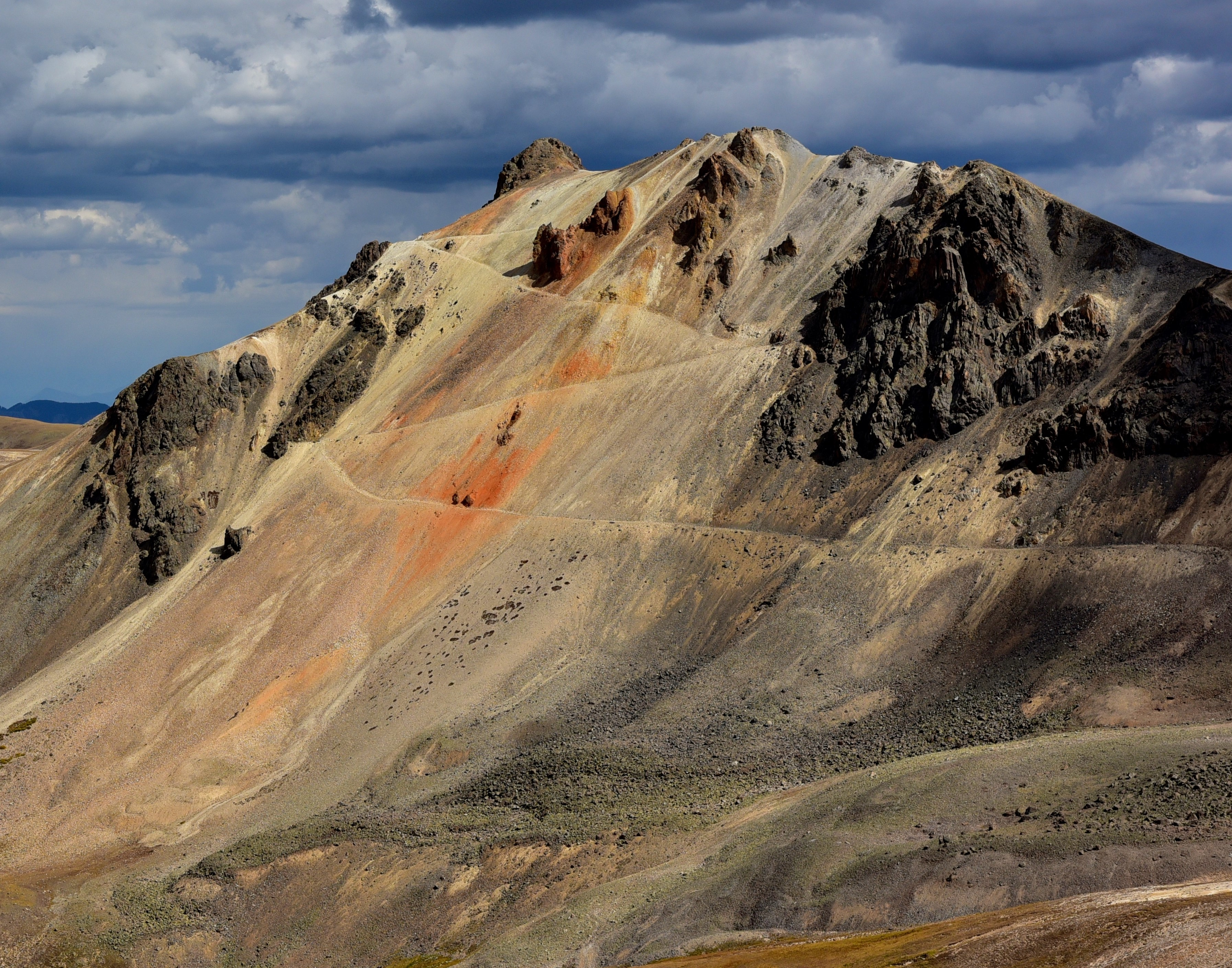
Southwest aspect

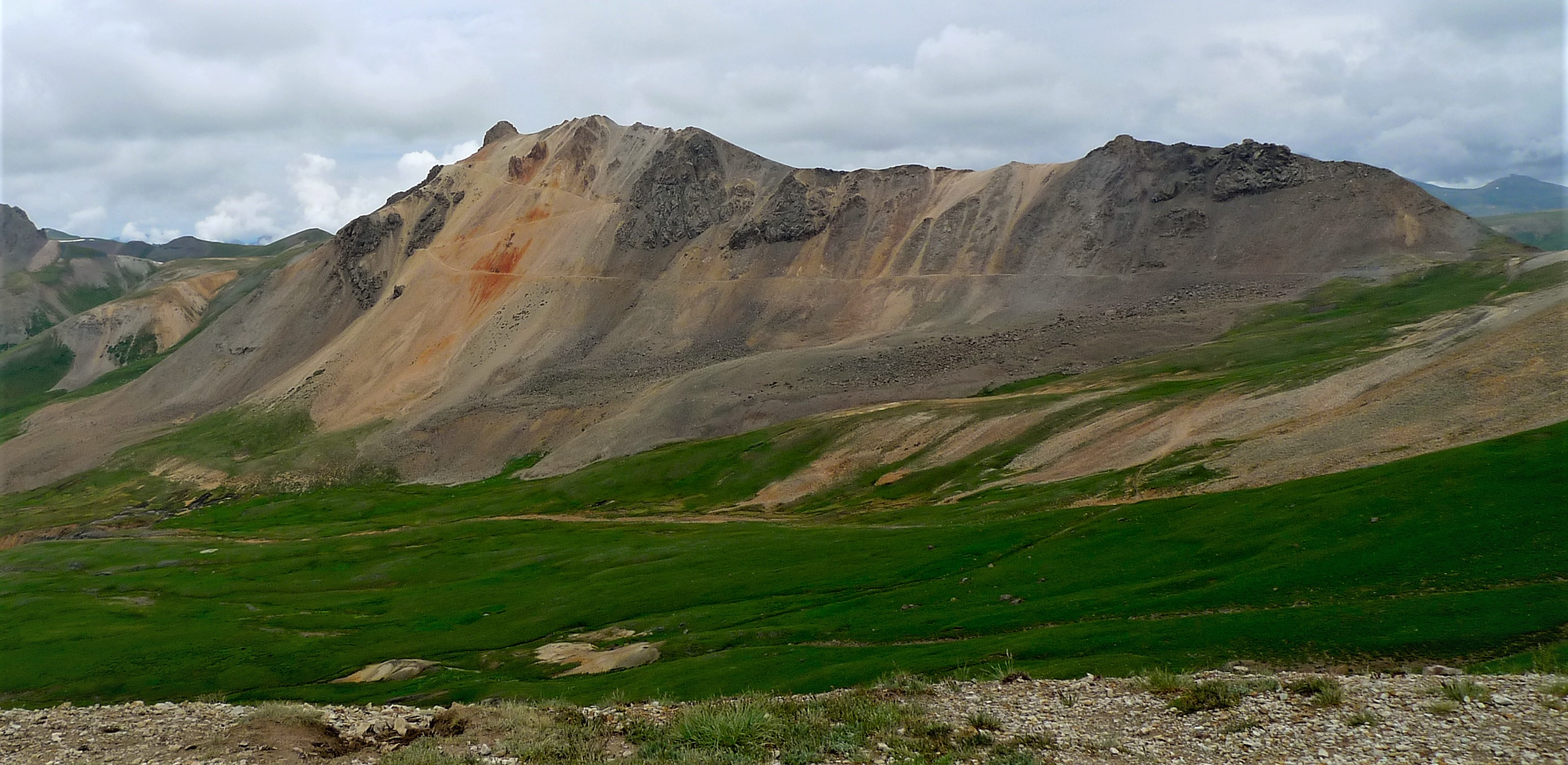
West aspect

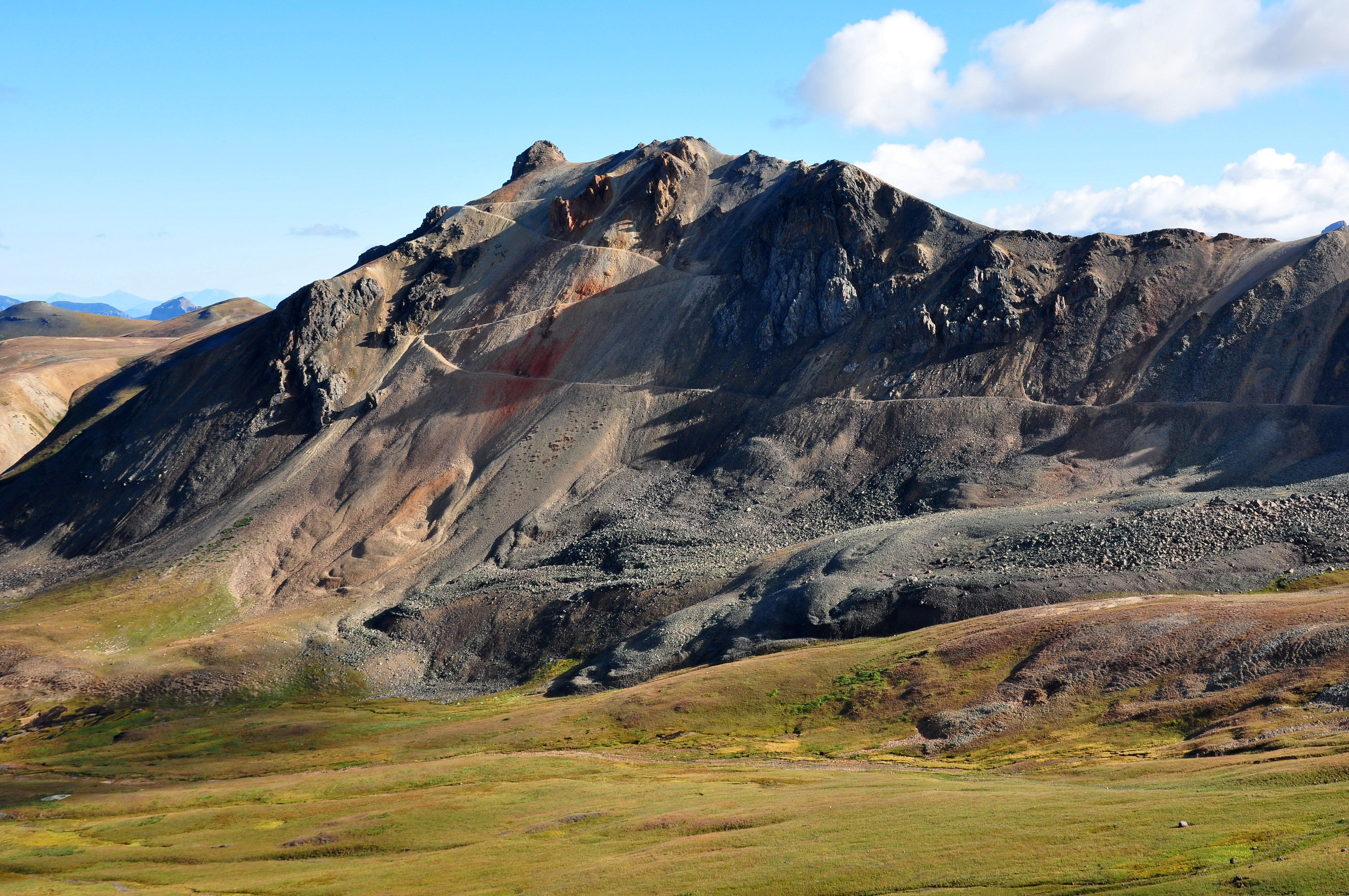

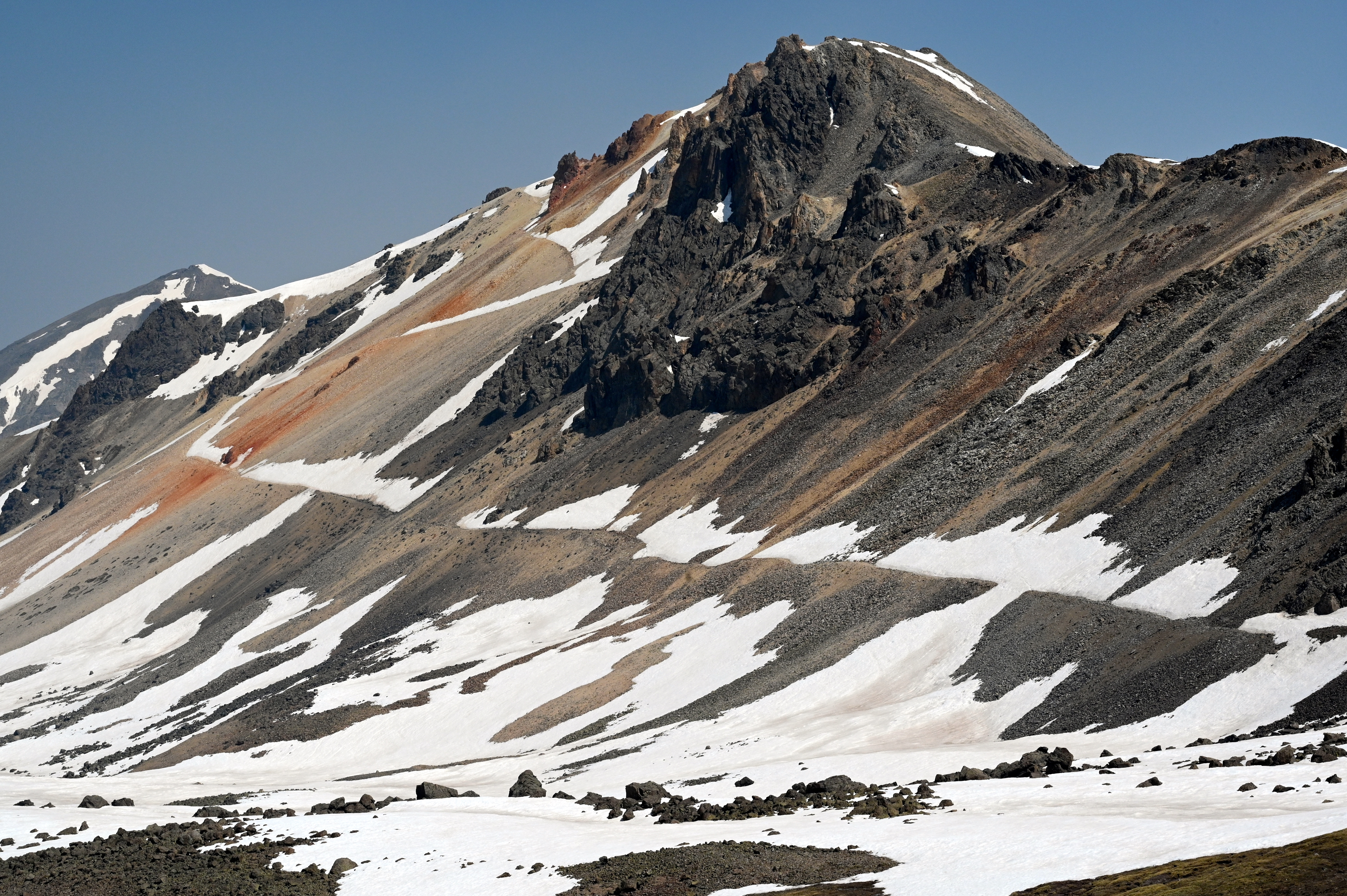
South asect

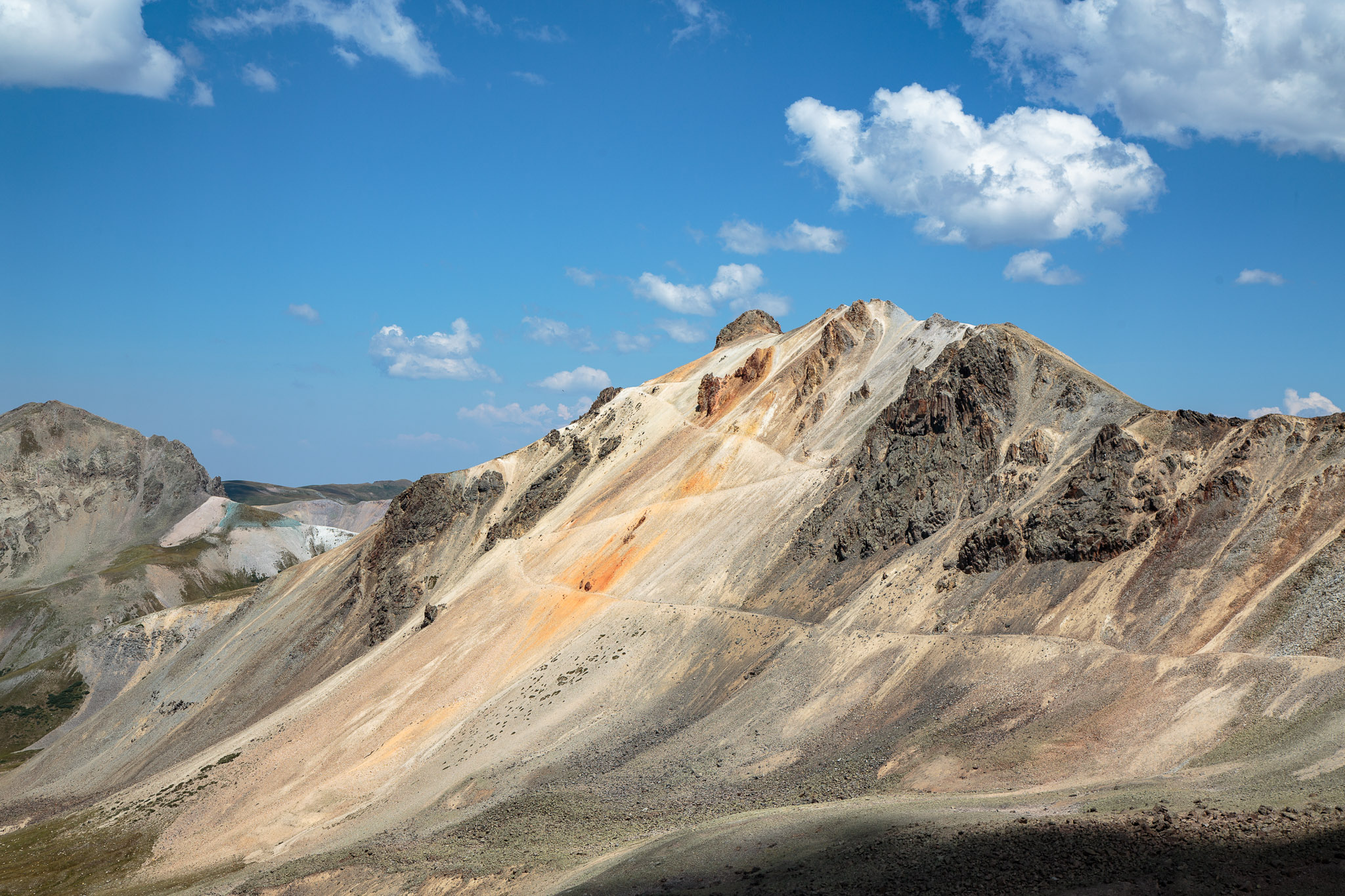

== See also ==
- Mountains of Hinsdale County, Colorado
- Mountains of Ouray County, Colorado
