= Engineer Mountain (Hinsdale and Ouray counties, Colorado) =

Mountain in the state of Colorado

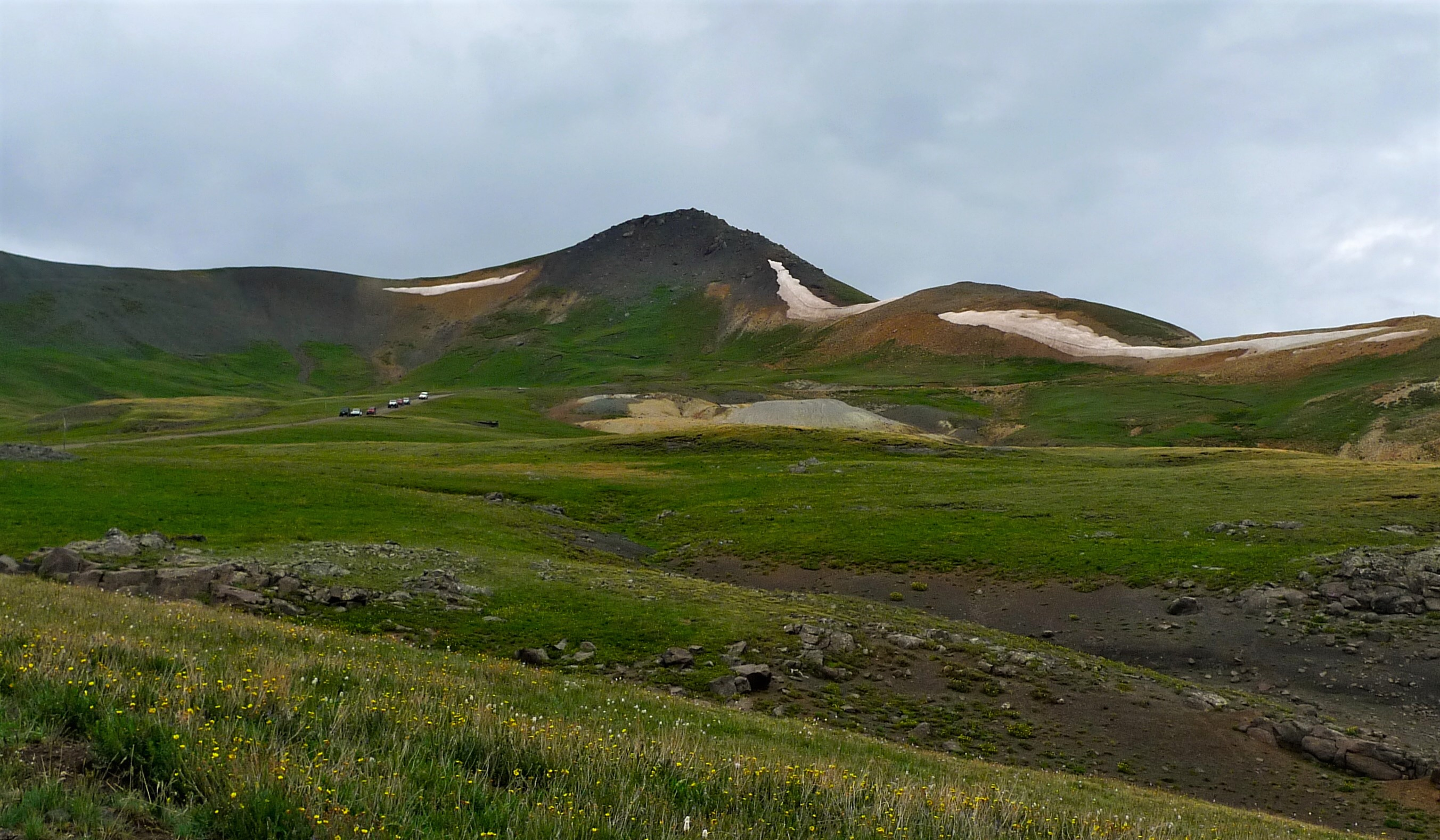
- Northeast aspect

Highest point
- Elevation: 13,225 ft (4,031 m)
- Prominence: 414 ft (126 m)
- Parent peak: Darley Mountain (13,260 ft)
- Isolation: 0.94 mi (1.51 km)
- Coordinates: 37°58′13″N 107°35′18″W

Geography
- Location within Colorado Location within the United States
- Country: United States
- State: Colorado
- County: Hinsdale / Ouray
- Parent range: Rocky Mountains; San Juan Mountains
- Topo map: USGS Handies Peak

Geology
- Rock type: Volcanic

Climbing
- Easiest route: class 1 hiking

Engineer Mountain is a 13,225-foot-elevation (4,031-meter) summit located on the boundary shared by Hinsdale County with Ouray County, in Colorado, United States.

== Description ==
Engineer Mountain is situated 5.7 miles southeast of the community of Ouray on land administered by the Bureau of Land Management. It is set west of the Continental Divide in the San Juan Mountains which are a subset of the Rocky Mountains. Neighboring geographic features include Engineer Pass 0.4 mile to the northeast and the nearest higher neighbor, Darley Mountain, is 0.86 mile to the north. Precipitation runoff from the mountain's west aspect drains into the Uncompahgre River via Bear and Mineral creeks, whereas the east slope drains to Henson Creek which is a tributary of the Gunnison River. Topographic relief is modest as the summit rises nearly 3,100 feet (940 meters) above the Uncompahgre River in two miles (3.2 km) and over 1,800 feet (550 meters) above Mineral Creek in 0.7 mile. Access to the mountain is via the Alpine Loop Back Country Byway at Engineer Pass and the summit offers one of the most spectacular views of the San Juan Mountains in this area.

== Etymology ==
Engineer Mountain's name commemorates the United States Army Corps of Engineers who surveyed this land in 1873. The mountain's toponym has been officially adopted by the United States Board on Geographic Names. There is another Engineer Mountain in Colorado's San Juan Mountains located 22 miles southwest of this one.

== Climate ==
According to the Köppen climate classification system, Engineer Mountain is located in an alpine subarctic climate zone with cold, snowy winters, and cool to warm summers. Due to its altitude, it receives precipitation all year, as snow in winter and as thunderstorms in summer, with a dry period in late spring. Hikers can expect afternoon rain, hail, and lightning from the seasonal monsoon in late July and August.

== Gallery ==
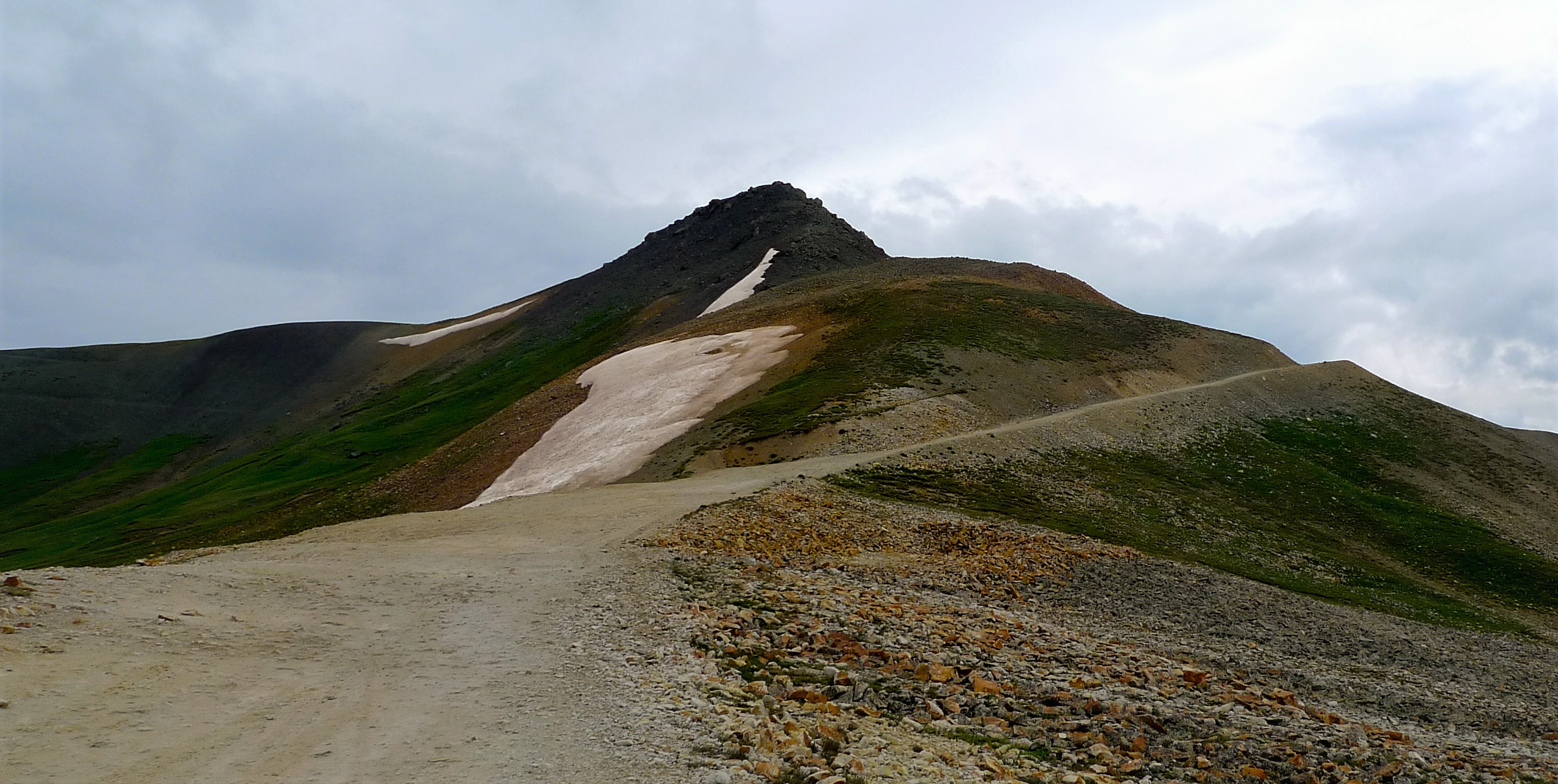
Engineer Mountain viewed from Engineer Pass

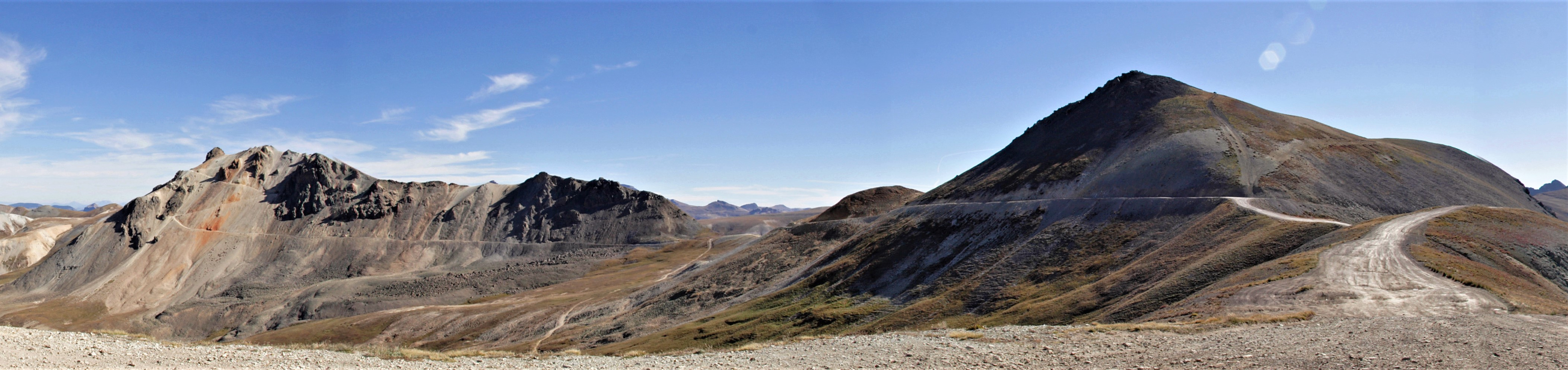
West aspect of Engineer Mountain (right) with parent Darley Mountain to the left

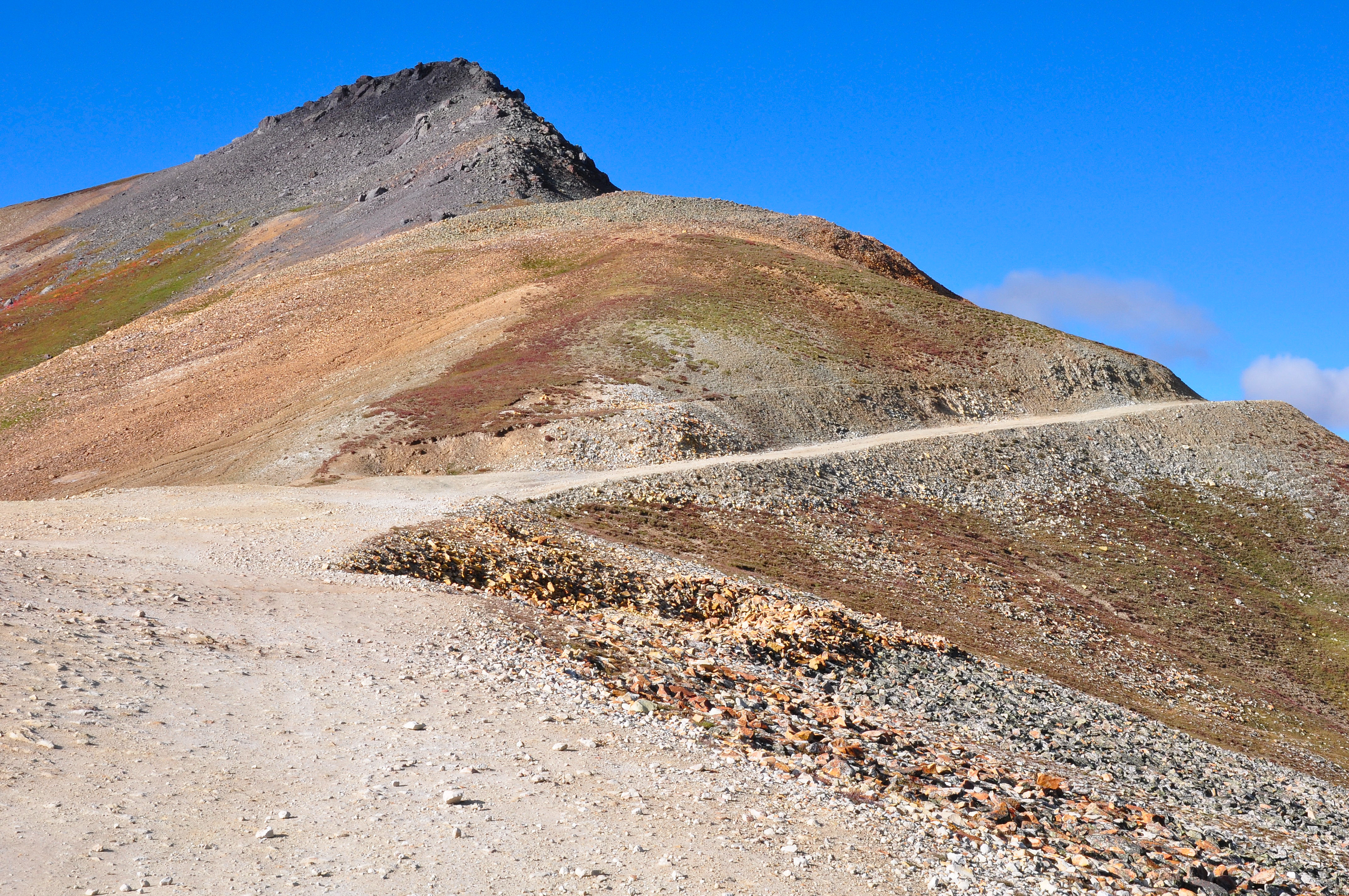

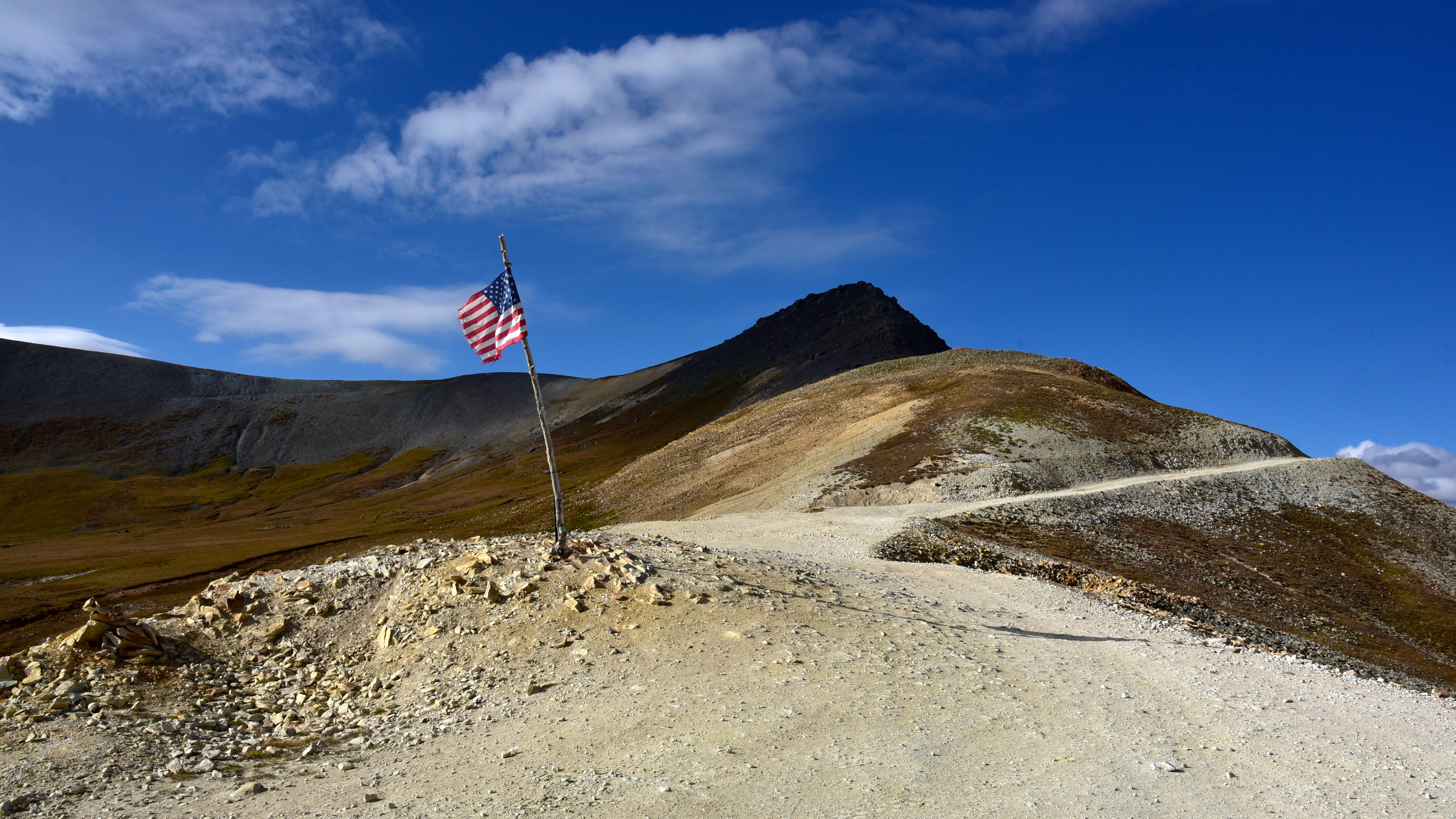
Engineer Mountain viewed from Engineer Pass

== See also ==
- Mountains of Hinsdale County, Colorado
- Mountains of Ouray County, Colorado
- Thirteener
