= Tuttle Mountain =

Mountain in Colorado, United States

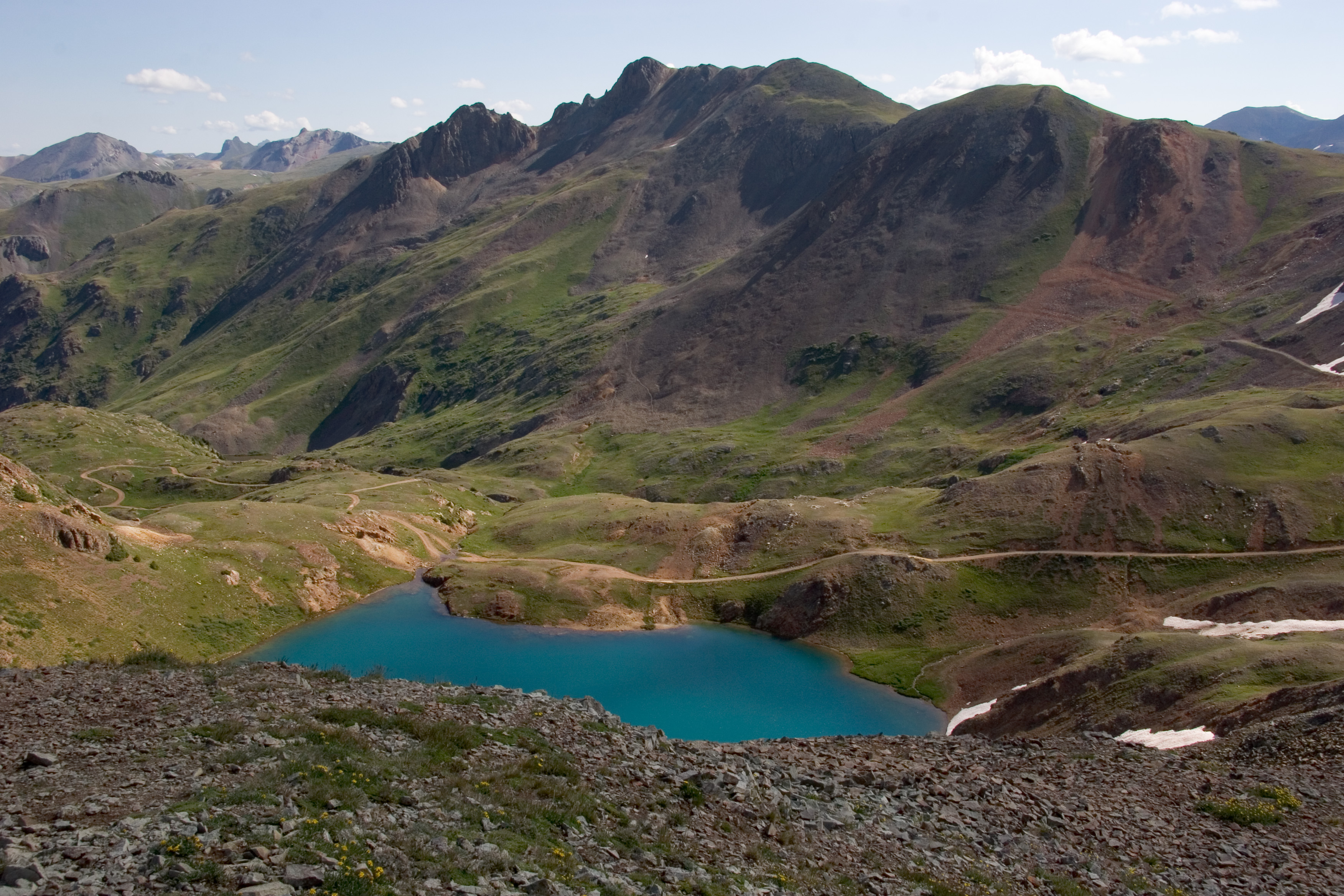
- Southwest aspect beyond Lake Como

Highest point
- Elevation: 13,208 ft (4,026 m)
- Prominence: 496 ft (151 m)
- Parent peak: Hanson Peak (13,462 ft)
- Isolation: 1.63 mi (2.62 km)
- Coordinates: 37°56′02″N 107°36′46″W

Geography
- Location within Colorado Location within the United States
- Country: United States
- State: Colorado
- County: San Juan
- Parent range: Rocky Mountains; San Juan Mountains
- Topo map: USGS Handies Peak

Climbing
- Easiest route: class 2

Tuttle Mountain is a 13,208-foot-elevation (4,026-meter) summit in San Juan County, Colorado, United States.

== Description ==
Tuttle Mountain is located seven miles (11 km) south-southeast of the community of Ouray and two miles (3.2 km) west of Animas Forks, on land administered by the Bureau of Land Management. Tuttle is situated nine miles (14 km) west of the Continental Divide in the San Juan Mountains which are a subrange of the Rocky Mountains. Precipitation runoff from the east side of the mountain drains into tributaries of the Animas River, and the west slope drains to headwaters of the Uncompahgre River. Topographic relief is significant as the summit rises approximately 1,400 feet (430 meters) above California Gulch in one-half mile and 1,600 feet (490 meters) above Poughkeepsie Gulch in one-half mile. Access to the mountain is via the Alpine Loop Back Country Byway. The mountain's toponym has been officially adopted by the United States Board on Geographic Names, and has been recorded in publications since at least 1906.

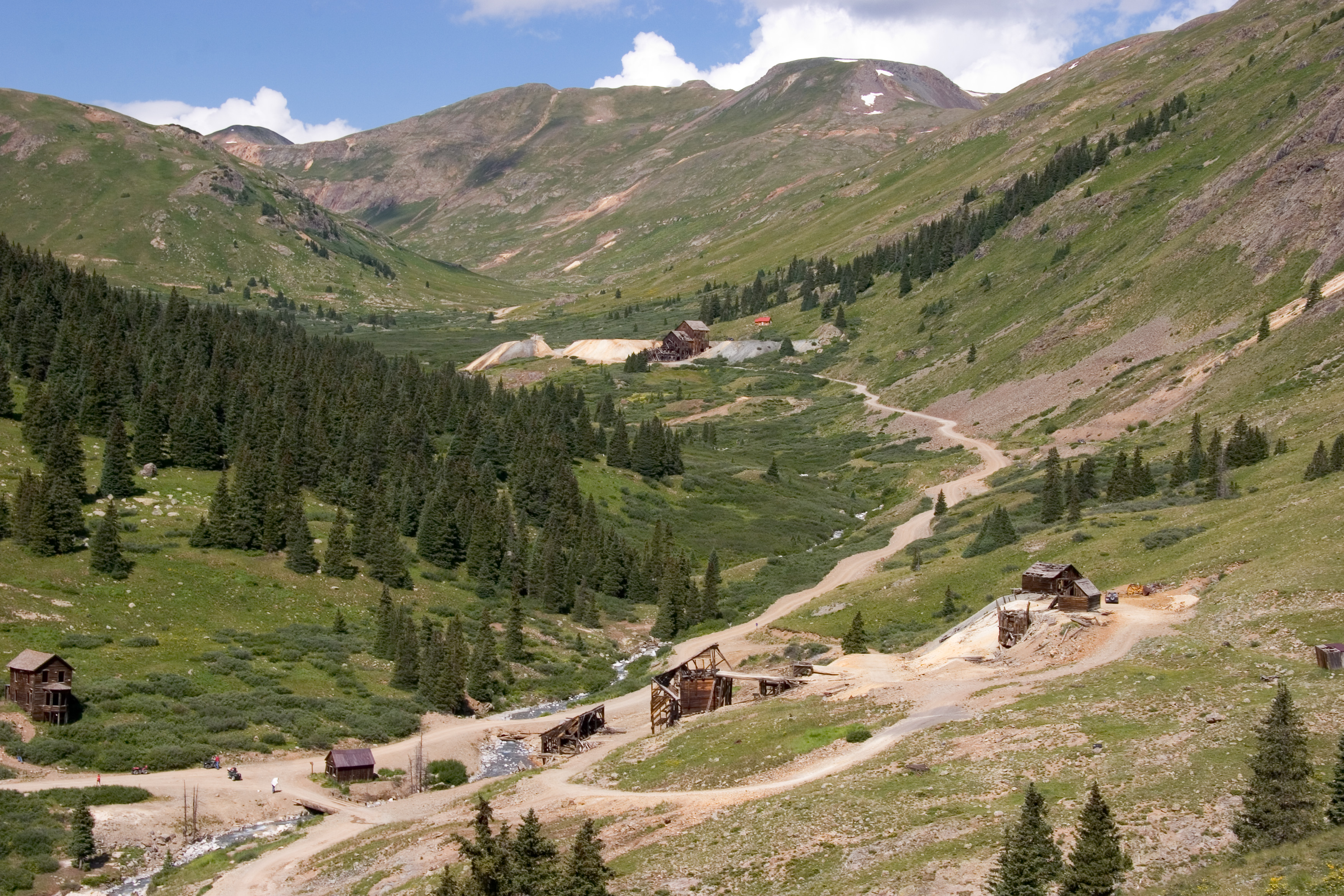
East aspect of Tuttle Mountain beyond Animas Forks

== Climate ==
According to the Köppen climate classification system, Tuttle Mountain is located in an alpine subarctic climate zone with cold, snowy winters, and cool to warm summers. Due to its altitude, it receives precipitation all year, as snow in winter, and as thunderstorms in summer, with a dry period in late spring.

== See also ==
- Mountains of San Juan County, Colorado
- Thirteener
