= Brown Mountain (Colorado) =

Mountain boundary shared by Ouray County and Juan County

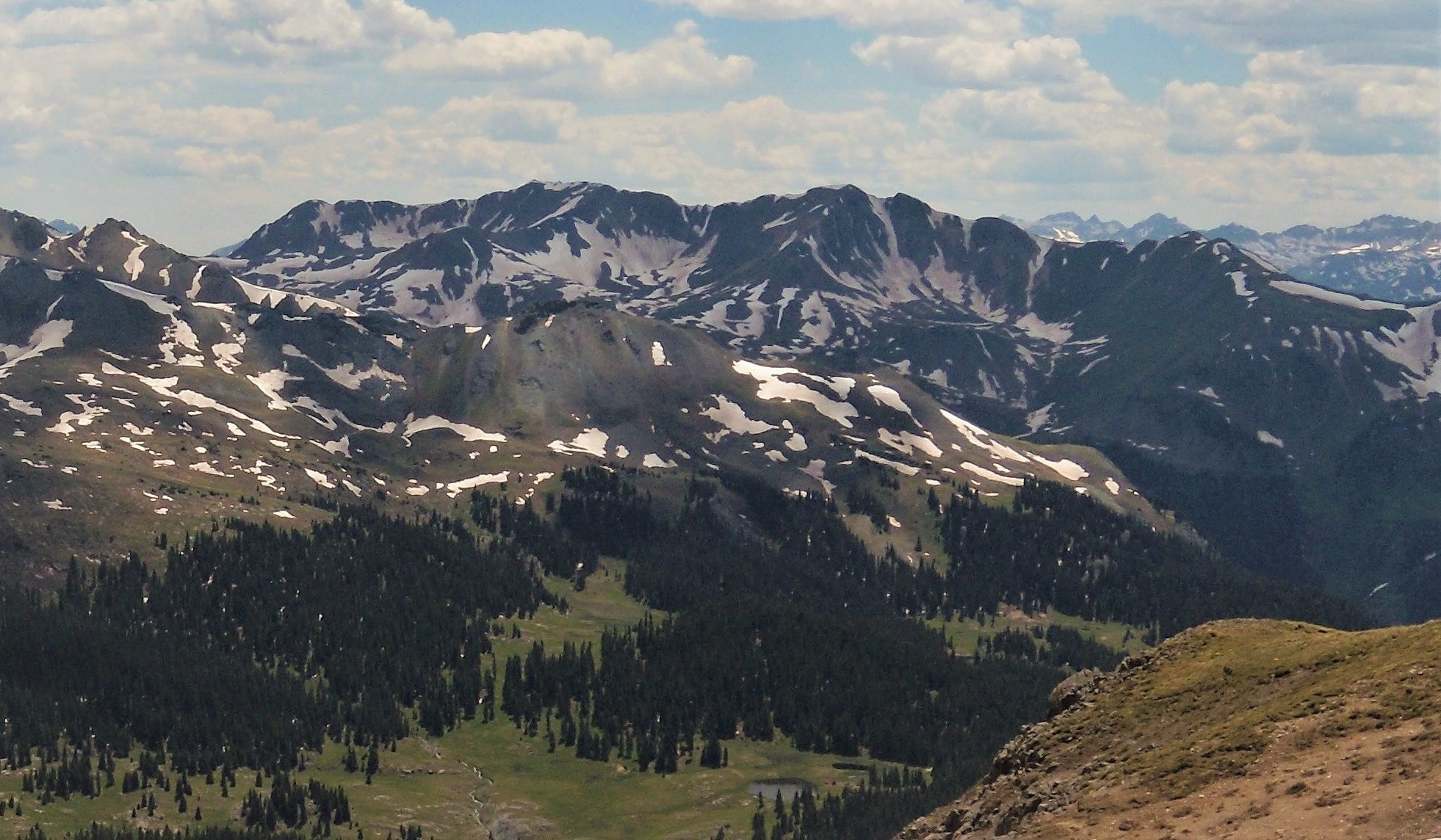
- Northeast aspect

Highest point
- Elevation: 13,347 ft (4,068 m)
- Prominence: 647 ft (197 m)
- Parent peak: Hanson Peak (13,462 ft)
- Isolation: 1.78 mi (2.86 km)
- Coordinates: 37°55′15″N 107°38′16″W

Geography
- Location within Colorado Location within the United States
- Country: United States
- State: Colorado
- County: Ouray / San Juan
- Protected area: Uncompahgre National Forest
- Parent range: Rocky Mountains; San Juan Mountains
- Topo map: USGS Ironton

Climbing
- Easiest route: class 2 hiking

Brown Mountain is a 13,347-foot-elevation (4,068-meter) summit located on the boundary shared by Ouray County with San Juan County in Colorado, United States.

== Description ==
Brown Mountain is situated midway between the towns of Ouray and Silverton, on land managed by Uncompahgre National Forest. It is set west of the Continental Divide in the San Juan Mountains which are a subrange of the Rocky Mountains. The long ridge-like mountain can be seen from the "Million Dollar Highway" (Highway 550) immediately east of Ironton Park. Topographic relief is significant as the summit rises 3,600 feet (1,100 meters) above Ironton Park in two miles and 2,350 feet (720 meters) above Gray Copper Gulch in one mile. Precipitation runoff from the mountain drains primarily into the Uncompahgre River, except the peak's south slope drains to Cement Creek which is a tributary of the Animas River. The mountain's toponym has been officially adopted by the United States Board on Geographic Names.

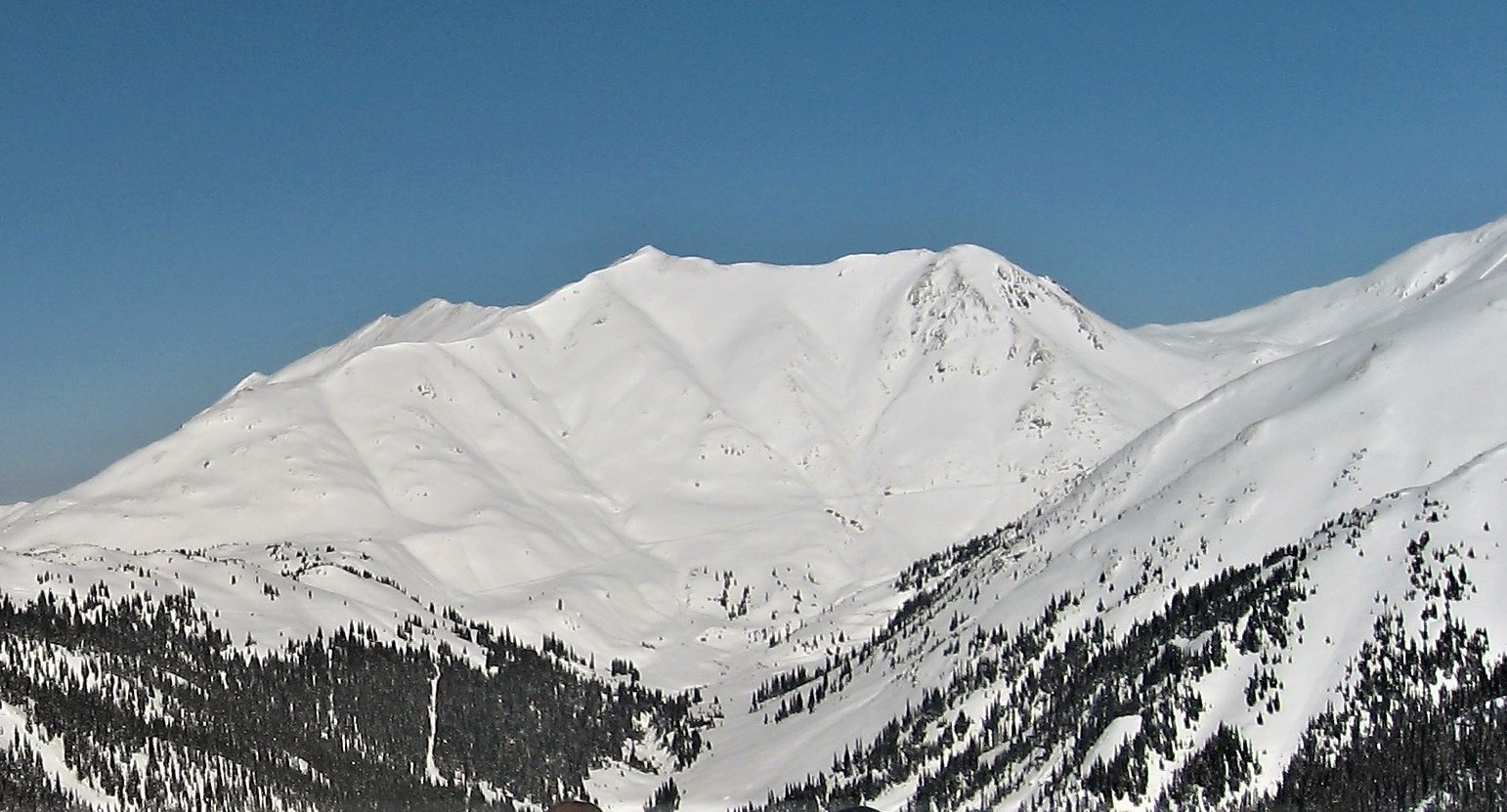
South aspect of Brown Mountain in winter

== Climate ==
According to the Köppen climate classification system, Brown Mountain is located in an alpine subarctic climate zone with long, cold, snowy winters, and cool to warm summers. Due to its altitude, it receives precipitation all year, as snow in winter and as thunderstorms in summer, with a dry period in late spring. Hikers can expect afternoon rain, hail, and lightning from the seasonal monsoon in late July and August.

== See also ==
- Mountains of Ouray County, Colorado
- Thirteener
