= Tornado outbreak sequence of April 20–27, 2007 =

Weather event in the United States

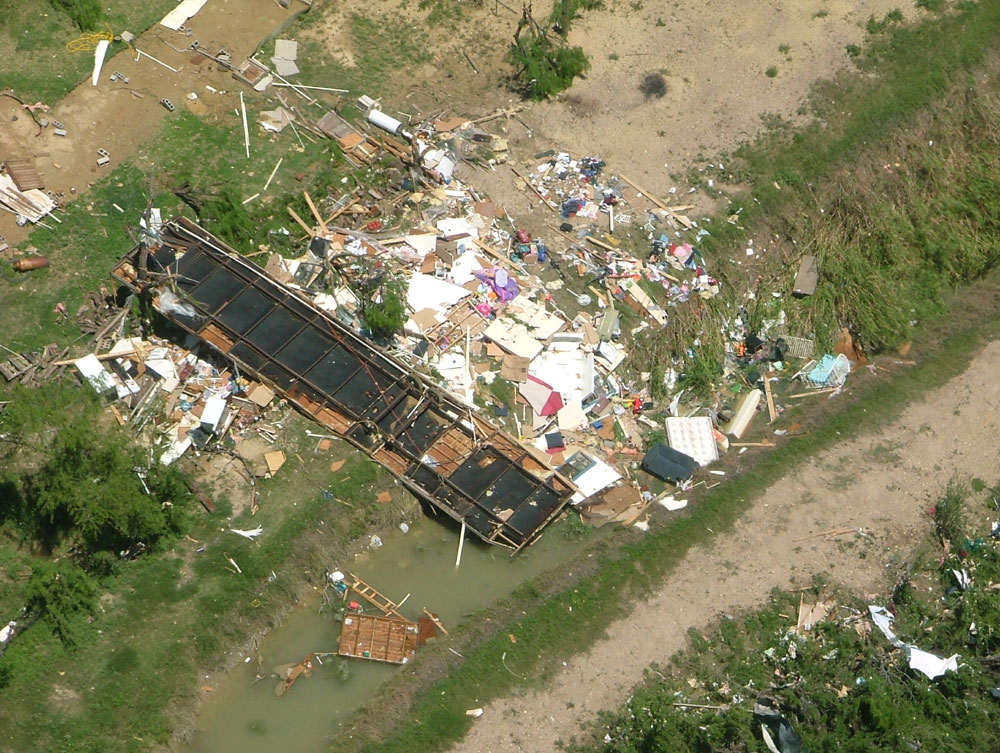
- Damage to a mobile home in Eagle Pass, Texas from an EF3 tornado.

Meteorological history
- Duration: April 20–27, 2007

Tornado outbreak
- Tornadoes: 91
- Max. rating: F4 tornado

Overall effects
- Casualties: 10 fatalities (+1 non-tornadic), ≥270 injuries
- Areas affected: Coahuila, Great Plains, Midwestern U.S., and Eastern U.S.
- Part of the tornado outbreaks of 2007

An extended period of tornado activity occurred between April 20–27, 2007. The outbreak sequence is best known for producing a deadly tornado that struck the border cities of Piedras Negras, Coahuila (rated F4), and Eagle Pass, Texas (rated EF3), along the United States-Mexican border on April 24, 2007, killing ten people. Other strong tornadoes also caused damage and injuries in or near the towns of Moorefield, Nebraska, Gothenburg, Nebraska, Cactus, Texas, and Tulia, Texas. In all, 91 tornadoes were confirmed causing 10 fatalities and injuring at least 270 others.

== Meteorological synopsis ==
Activity was not widespread on April 20, but two strong tornadoes were confirmed in southwestern Nebraska from a single supercell that suddenly developed. The first was an EF3 tornado near Moorefield, Nebraska, which destroyed six farmsteads and injured two people. A large wedge EF2 tornado touched down near Gothenburg and injured nine people as it crossed over Interstate 80, before moving north through rural areas, damaging several farms.

On April 20, the SPC issued a moderate risk of severe thunderstorms for the Texas and Oklahoma Panhandles and the southwestern part of Kansas for April 21, which was extended into Nebraska later. Widespread severe weather developed that evening, although the primary result of the supercells was large hail. The meteorological synopsis was virtually identical to March 28 except for the fact that the air mass was not as unstable. In total, 24 tornadoes were confirmed Despite this, five EF2 tornadoes were confirmed in the Texas Panhandle that day. A large high-end EF2 tornado struck Cactus, Texas damaging or destroying numerous structures and injuring 14 people. Another high-end EF2 tornado struck community was Tulia, Texas where more structures were heavily damaged or destroyed and three people were injured. Over 100 reports of hail were recorded on this day as well. Only isolated severe weather activity occurred on April 22 with only one tornado being confirmed.

A severe weather outbreak was forecast for April 23 and 24 across the southern Plains. In the early morning hours of April 22, the SPC issued a moderate risk of severe weather for South Central Kansas, Central Oklahoma, and North Central Texas. This was an extremely rare issuance; at the time, this was only the third time that such a risk been issued so far in advance with the others being for June 10, 2005 and January 2, 2006, although neither time did it result in a major outbreak. Several tornadic storms were reported across northwest and south-central Texas, far western Oklahoma, and southwest Kansas on April 23. A total of 29 tornadoes were confirmed, although most stayed over sparsely populated area. The activity quickly redeveloped late on the morning of April 24. Later in the afternoon, the risk that day was upgraded to a high risk over parts of East Texas. Tornadoes, along with large hail and damaging winds, occurred in the afternoon and evening hours across the Plains. Although there was virtually no activity in the high risk area, several tornadoes occurred elsewhere. One large tornadic supercell produced a deadly F4 tornado in Piedras Negras, Coahuila in Mexico killing three people, the same supercell moved across the United States-Mexican border and into the Eagle Pass, Texas metro, with reports of significant damage on the U.S. side of the border and at least seven deaths and 80 injuries from the EF3 tornado, plus at least three deaths and at least 153 injuries across the river in Piedras Negras. Isolated tornadic activity occurred on April 25, but a non-tornadic fatality occurred in Lake Village, Arkansas when 60 miles per hour (97 km/h) winds capsized a boat on Lake Chicot.

Several tornadoes developed across the Midwest and into the Tennessee Valley on the afternoon and evening of April 26. The hardest hit communities were LaPorte, Indiana, which was struck by two EF1 tornadoes, and New Tazewell, Tennessee, which was also hit by an EF1 tornado, where structural damage was reported in both communities, and dozens of houses were damaged or destroyed. Several other scattered tornadoes were reported, along with widespread wind damage. In total, seven people were injured. Four other tornadoes were confirmed in Ohio and Illinois. In the final review of 2007, three EF0 tornadoes were confirmed on April 27. Two of which were in Missouri and the other touched down in Virginia.

== Confirmed tornadoes ==
Confirmed tornadoes by Enhanced Fujita rating
EFU	EF0	EF1	EF2	EF3	EF4	EF5	Total
0	60	23	6	1	1*	0	91

- Note: Mexico used the Fujita Scale at the time the tornado that occurred was rated, hence the F4 rating.

=== April 20 event ===
List of confirmed tornadoes – Friday, April 20, 2007 (Note: All dates are based on the local time zone where the tornado touched down; however, all times are in Coordinated Universal Time for consistency.)
EF#	Location	County / Parish	State	Start Coord.	Time (UTC)	Path length	Max width	Summary
EF3	ESE of Moorefield to SW of Brady	Frontier, Lincoln	NE	40.6966°N 100.277°W	02:16–02:46	15.74 mi (25.33 km)	440 yd (400 m)	An intense tornado began its damage by tearing the roof and attached garage off of a house, blowing the windows out of another, and destroying a third. Also in this area, the tornado destroyed grain bins and outbuildings, carried a horse trailer 50 yards, overturned irrigation pivots, scattered irrigation pipe, destroyed a wind mill, and pulled a fence line out of the ground. As the tornado entered Lincoln County, it destroyed a large storage building, removed the roof and an exterior wall from one home, and completely destroyed an unanchored home. Numerous trees and power poles were snapped along the path. Two people were injured when they were thrown 50 yd (46 m) from the unanchored home.
EF2	SSW of Gothenburg to SW of Callaway	Dawson, Custer	NE	41.0299°N 100.1647°W	03:02–03:40	18.92 mi (30.45 km)	1,320 yd (1,210 m)	This large wedge tornado injured nine people as it crossed Interstate 80, where several vehicles and semis were blown off the road. Nearly a dozen head of cattle were killed nearby, and a farmhouse lost half of its roof and had many windows blown out. The tornado then destroyed a barn, chicken house, milk house, an oil bin, and two dryer bins. Irrigation pivots were overturned, and numerous trees and power poles were snapped along the path.

=== April 21 event ===
List of confirmed tornadoes – Saturday, April 21, 2007
EF#	Location	County / Parish	State	Start Coord.	Time (UTC)	Path length	Max width	Summary
EF0	W of Littlefield	Lamb	TX	33.9208°N 102.4245°W	23:20–23:24	2 mi (3.2 km)	200 yd (180 m)	Weak tornado over open fields with no damage.
EF0	SE of Campo	Baca	CO	37.0489°N 102.5159°W	23:25–23:32	2.68 mi (4.31 km)	75 yd (69 m)	Tornado remained over open fields, causing no damage.
EF0	SW of Granada	Prowers	CO	37.9984°N 102.4109°W	23:25–23:35	3.05 mi (4.91 km)	300 yd (270 m)	Large, slow-moving tornado remained over open country with no damage.
EF1	NW of Boys Ranch to SE of Hartley	Oldham, Hartley	TX	35.5312°N 102.3211°W	23:51–00:27	17.13 mi (27.57 km)	880 yd (800 m)	Power poles, signs, and fences were damaged.
EF0	N of Bethune	Kit Carson	CO	39.4179°N 102.4704°W	23:54–23:55	0.5 mi (0.80 km)	10 yd (9.1 m)	A shed was lofted and flipped over, resulting in damage to a hay bailer and two grain bins.
EF2	N of Fieldton to NW of Kress	Lamb, Hale, Castro, Swisher	TX	34.0553°N 102.2226°W	23:57–00:36	28.75 mi (46.27 km)	1,230 yd (1,120 m)	In Lamb County, this long-tracked tornado damaged irrigation pivots and power poles, tore the roofs off of two brick buildings, heavily damaged five homes, destroyed lightweight metal structures, damaged farm equipment, and blew skirting from a mobile home as it passed near Olton. Irrigation pivots were destroyed and power poles were snapped in Hale, Castro, and Swisher Counties before the tornado dissipated. A dog and some livestock was killed, and one person was injured.
EF2	SW of Dumas to SE of Stratford	Moore, Sherman	TX	35.7947°N 102.1347°W	00:16–00:52	26.72 mi (43.00 km)	1,320 yd (1,210 m)	Large wedge tornado caused major damage in the town of Cactus. Ten mobile homes were destroyed with others heavily damaged. Many homes and businesses sustained varying degrees of damage. 14 people were injured.
EF0	SE of Plankinton	Aurora	SD	43.6791°N 98.4234°W	00:48–00:58	2.77 mi (4.46 km)	100 yd (91 m)	Tornado remained over open country with no damage.
EF2	E of Four Way to SE of Dumas	Moore	TX	35.6821°N 101.9166°W	00:50–01:15	11.83 mi (19.04 km)	704 yd (644 m)	Power poles were snapped, a fence was downed, and large hay bales were tossed around.
EF2	Tulia	Swisher	TX	34.5259°N 101.7822°W	00:57–01:01	3 mi (4.8 km)	200 yd (180 m)	30 homes and 20 businesses in Tulia were damaged or destroyed, with a supermarket and industrial buildings sustaining major damage. A storm chaser's vehicle was thrown into a brick building, and a semi-truck was blown into the chase vehicle. A collection of antique cars in a storage building were also damaged by the collapse of overhead doors and roof purlins, and 5 mobile homes were destroyed. A car dealership was heavily damaged, with 41 vehicles damaged by flying debris, and a motor home on the property was overturned. Damage and economic loss was estimated at $2 million. 3 people were injured.
EF0	E of Dumas	Moore	TX	35.8521°N 101.8273°W	01:06–01:08	1 mi (1.6 km)	50 yd (46 m)	Tornado remained over open country with no damage.
EF1	NE of Tulia	Swisher	TX	34.6529°N 101.7707°W	01:11–01:16	4 mi (6.4 km)	300 yd (270 m)	A large barn was heavily damaged.
EF0	W of Sunray	Moore	TX	34.6529°N 101.7707°W	01:19–01:23	1.53 mi (2.46 km)	100 yd (91 m)	Tornado remained over open country with no damage.
EF0	E of Happy	Swisher	TX	34.7303°N 101.5861°W	01:20–01:24	1.53 mi (2.46 km)	500 yd (460 m)	Large tornado remained over open country with no damage.
EF1	NE of Sunray to SE of Stratford	Moore, Sherman	TX	34.7303°N 101.5861°W	01:36–01:50	9.31 mi (14.98 km)	1,320 yd (1,210 m)	A barn was destroyed, hog barns sustained roof damage, and empty rail cars were overturned.
EF1	E of Wayside	Armstrong	TX	34.7511°N 101.5502°W	01:45–01:55	3.33 mi (5.36 km)	440 yd (400 m)	Damage was limited to power poles.
EF1	E of Dumas to SW of Sunray	Moore	TX	35.8511°N 101.8987°W	01:45–02:00	12.23 mi (19.68 km)	440 yd (400 m)	A feedyard sustained minor damage and double wooden power poles were snapped.
EF0	SE of Esmond	Kingsbury	SD	44.2257°N 97.6208°W	01:56–01:58	0.2 mi (0.32 km)	50 yd (46 m)	Brief tornado caused no damage.
EF0	SE of Lautz	Sherman	TX	36.0693°N 101.7447°W	01:58–02:12	7.97 mi (12.83 km)	700 yd (640 m)	Large tornado remained over open country with no damage.
EF1	SW of Sunray	Moore	TX	35.9587°N 101.8058°W	01:59–02:02	2 mi (3.2 km)	704 yd (644 m)	Property damage occurred and double wooden power poles were snapped.
EF1	SE of Canyon	Randall	TX	34.82671°N 101.7331°W	02:00–02:15	10.7 mi (17.2 km)	880 yd (800 m)	Tornado damaged power poles and farm structures. A horse was killed.
EF2	NE of Claude to SE of Panhandle	Armstrong, Carson	TX	35.16981°N 101.2231°W	02:35–03:10	12.88 mi (20.73 km)	440 yd (400 m)	Power poles were damaged while tractors, turbines, vehicles and cotton presser box cars were moved and/or tossed, some for considerable distances.
EF0	E of Claude	Armstrong	TX	35.1208°N 101.1933°W	02:40–03:45	4.21 mi (6.78 km)	50 yd (46 m)	Tornado remained over open country with no damage.
EF1	W of Alanreed to SW of Kings Mill	Gray	TX	35.1208°N 101.1933°W	02:50–03:10	12.7 mi (20.4 km)	50 yd (46 m)	A house lost part of its roof, power poles were snapped, and storage buildings and outbuildings were destroyed.

=== April 22 event ===
List of confirmed tornadoes – Sunday, April 22, 2007
EF#	Location	County / Parish	State	Start Coord.	Time (UTC)	Path length	Max width	Summary
EF0	SW of Osmond	Pierce	NE	42.3393°N 97.6215°W	19:43–19:44	0.5 mi (0.80 km)	100 yd (91 m)	No damage occurred as a tornado remained over open country.

=== April 23 event ===
List of confirmed tornadoes – Monday, April 23, 2007
EF#	Location	County / Parish	State	Start Coord.	Time (UTC)	Path length	Max width	Summary
EF0	SSW of Buffalo	Harper	OK	36.7231°N 99.6753°W	23:14	0.2 mi (0.32 km)	30 yd (27 m)	NWS employees and storm chasers observed a brief and small tornado.
EF0	NE of Laverne	Harper	OK	36.7609°N 99.849°W	23:51	0.2 mi (0.32 km)	30 yd (27 m)	An off-duty NWS meteorologist observed a tornado.
EF0	E of Colorado City	Mitchell	TX	32.4°N 100.7815°W	00:43–00:56	4 mi (6.4 km)	50 yd (46 m)	A tornado damaged a field irrigation system, power poles, vegetation, and signs along I-20.
EF1	E of Sharon Springs	Wallace	KS	38.88°N 101.6743°W	00:47–01:25	12 mi (19 km)	50 yd (46 m)	Power poles were broken.
EF0	N of Wallace	Wallace	KS	38.9923°N 101.58°W	01:03–01:18	5 mi (8.0 km)	75 yd (69 m)	A tornado remained over open fields and did no known damage.
EF0	SE of Sitka	Clark	KS	37.0947°N 99.5682°W	01:04–01:08	1.4 mi (2.3 km)	50 yd (46 m)	A tornado tracked northeast across open land.
EF0	SW of Janus	Mitchell, Nolan	TX	32.4022°N 100.6629°W	01:04–01:06	0.58 mi (0.93 km)	50 yd (46 m)	A cone tornado remained over open land.
EF0	S of Del Rio	Val Verde	TX	29.3122°N 100.9°W	01:06–01:08	0.2 mi (0.32 km)	20 yd (18 m)	Staff from the Del Rio Fire and Rescue observed a small tornado in an open area doing no damage.
EF1	SE of Sitka	Clark	KS	37.1159°N 99.5587°W	01:10–01:35	7.8 mi (12.6 km)	150 yd (140 m)	Trees, power poles and a small shed were damaged. The tornado was a twin to the tornado below.
EF0	WSW of Protection	Comanche	KS	37.186°N 99.5354°W	01:22–01:34	1.7 mi (2.7 km)	75 yd (69 m)	A tornado did minor damage to some trees and was a twin to the previous tornado.
EF0	Val Verde Park	Val Verde	TX	29.37°N 100.8336°W	01:34–01:37	1 mi (1.6 km)	30 yd (27 m)	A sheriff's deputy watched a rope tornado damage ten homes and mobile homes. The tornado also knocked over telephone poles and tossed outbuildings.
EF0	WNW of Protection	Comanche	KS	37.2151°N 99.5219°W	01:37–01:41	1.63 mi (2.62 km)	50 yd (46 m)	A tornado remained over open pasture land.
EF0	NW of Sweetwater	Nolan	TX	32.49°N 100.4602°W	02:00–02:03	0.9 mi (1.4 km)	50 yd (46 m)	A tornado occurred over open country.
EF0	NNE of Trent	Taylor	TX	32.5089°N 100.1158°W	02:20–02:22	0.34 mi (0.55 km)	50 yd (46 m)	A tornado was briefly observed.
EF0	SSE of Brewster	Thomas	KS	39.2899°N 101.3371°W	02:38–02:59	6 mi (9.7 km)	25 yd (23 m)	An empty grain bin was destroyed, several trees were uprooted and minor home damage occurred.
EF0	W of Hodges	Jones	TX	32.58°N 99.91°W	02:41–02:46	0.68 mi (1.09 km)	50 yd (46 m)	A tornado was observed for several minutes.
EF0	NE of Goodland	Sherman	KS	39.4569°N 101.5875°W	03:02–03:04	0.5 mi (0.80 km)	10 yd (9.1 m)	A tornado was spotted from the National Weather Service office in Goodland as it remained over open fields.
EF1	NW of Levant to SSW of Atwood	Thomas, Rawlins	KS	39.4158°N 101.2463°W	03:15–04:15	15.5 mi (24.9 km)	50 yd (46 m)	Power pole and tree damage occurred.
EF1	S of Atwood	Rawlins	KS	39.5687°N 101.05°W	04:15–04:39	12.5 mi (20.1 km)	100 yd (91 m)	A high-end EF1 removed the roof off a home, destroyed many outbuildings, grain bins and trees. An irrigation system as also damaged.
EF1	SE of Atwood	Rawlins	KS	39.6978°N 100.917°W	04:44–04:59	6 mi (9.7 km)	75 yd (69 m)	Power poles were broken and a farmstead had an outbuilding damaged.
EF0	N of Wray	Yuma	CO	40.2969°N 102.23°W	04:49–04:50	0.5 mi (0.80 km)	10 yd (9.1 m)	A tornado remained over open fields, causing no damage.
EF0	SE of Holyoke	Phillips	CO	40.44°N 102.12°W	05:00	0.1 mi (0.16 km)	50 yd (46 m)	A brief tornado caused no damage.
EF0	SW of Enders	Chase	NE	40.3836°N 101.6173°W	05:15–05:16	0.5 mi (0.80 km)	20 yd (18 m)	A weak tornado touched down briefly in open rangeland.
EF0	SW of Enders	Chase	NE	40.3887°N 101.6106°W	05:16–05:17	0.25 mi (0.40 km)	20 yd (18 m)	A trained spotter reported a weak tornado over open land.

=== April 24 event ===
List of confirmed tornadoes – Tuesday, April 24, 2007
EF#	Location	County / Parish	State	Start Coord.	Time (UTC)	Path length	Max width	Summary
EF0	Eastern Wild Horse	Cheyenne	CO	38.82°N 103°W	17:58–17:59	0.5 mi (0.80 km)	10 yd (9.1 m)	A brief tornado damaged the doors on a quonset hut, a trailer was pushed over and the cross on a church received minor damage.
EF0	W of Wild Horse	Cheyenne	CO	38.82°N 103.0557°W	18:15–18:25	4 mi (6.4 km)	25 yd (23 m)	A tornado remained over open fields.
EF0	WNW of Wild Horse to SE of Boyero	Cheyenne, Lincoln	CO	38.8532°N 103.1029°W	18:38–18:46	2 mi (3.2 km)	50 yd (46 m)	No known damage occurred as a small tornado remained over open fields.
EF0	SE of Boyero	Lincoln	CO	38.87°N 103.19°W	18:58	0.1 mi (0.16 km)	50 yd (46 m)	A tornado occurred over open land.
EF1	ESE of Granbury	Hood	TX	32.3836°N 97.6101°W	19:00–19:02	0.5 mi (0.80 km)	50 yd (46 m)	A tornado moved through Pecan Plantation, causing damage to trees and homes. One brick home had portions of its roof removed, the garage door blown in and windows broken.
EF0	WSW of Lincoln Park	Denton	TX	33.22°N 97.0118°W	19:20–19:22	1 mi (1.6 km)	50 yd (46 m)	The roof of a restaurant was damaged. Tree limbs were snapped and a gas station sign was also damaged.
EF1	NNE of Cheyenne Wells	Cheyenne	CO	38.9001°N 102.3074°W	19:26–19:36	4.5 mi (7.2 km)	25 yd (23 m)	A single power pole was broken.
EF0	NE of Arapahoe	Cheyenne	CO	38.9011°N 102.1043°W	19:37–19:45	4 mi (6.4 km)	25 yd (23 m)	A tornado remained over open fields.
EF0	NW of Weskan	Wallace	KS	38.9007°N 102.0094°W	19:48–19:49	0.5 mi (0.80 km)	10 yd (9.1 m)	
EF0	NNE of Arapahoe	Cheyenne	CO	38.9569°N 102.1131°W	19:55–20:14	5 mi (8.0 km)	50 yd (46 m)	A cone tornado was reported by a storm chaser. The tornado did no damage as it remained over open fields.
EF0	NW of Cheyenne Wells	Cheyenne	CO	39.004°N 102.5865°W	20:00–20:01	0.5 mi (0.80 km)	10 yd (9.1 m)	A tornado caused no damage over open fields.
EF0	NW of Cheyenne Wells	Cheyenne	CO	39.0858°N 102.6918°W	20:00–20:01	0.5 mi (0.80 km)	10 yd (9.1 m)	No known damage occurred.
EF0	WNW of Pawhuska	Osage	OK	36.7032°N 96.4299°W	20:27–20:35	5.5 mi (8.9 km)	100 yd (91 m)	A storm chaser for a local station reported a tornado over open country.
EF0	W of Golden City	Barton	MO	37.3796°N 94.1257°W	23:20–23:21	2.83 mi (4.55 km)	25 yd (23 m)	A weak tornado caused minor damage to three outbuildings.
F4	Piedras Negras, COA to E of Rosita, TX	Piedras Negras (COA), Maverick (TX)	COA, TX	28.67°N 100.58°W	23:45–00:10	13.67 mi (22.00 km)	1,094 yd (1,000 m)	10 deaths – A violent tornado touched down in the Acoros neighborhood of Piedras Negras. The tornado tracked southeast inflicting damage to numerous buildings before entering the Villa de Fuente neighborhood, where the worst damage occurred. Well-built masonry buildings were destroyed in this area, cars were thrown and mangled, and trees were debarked. In Piedras Negras overall, 611 homes had serious damage and 208 were considered total losses. 3 people died and 153 were injured in Mexico. The tornado then crossed the Rio Grande into the United States and struck the Rosita neighborhood in Eagle Pass. An elementary school was destroyed, and two nearby brick businesses were left with only interior walls standing. Numerous homes and mobile homes were destroyed as well, some of which were leveled or swept away. A total of 59 manufactured homes and 57 houses were destroyed by the tornado in and around Rosita. Major damage was reported to 21 manufactured homes and 19 houses, with minor damage to 10 manufactured homes, 22 houses, and 9 apartments. 7 fatalities and eighty injuries occurred along the American portion of the damage path of this tornado. The Mexican section of the path was given an F4 rating while the American section of the path was given an EF3 rating.
EF0	SW of Nickerson	Reno	KS	38.0784°N 98.171°W	00:01	0.03 mi (0.048 km)	25 yd (23 m)	A brief tornado touched down in open country.
EF0	SW of Nickerson	Reno	KS	38.0887°N 98.158°W	00:09	0.03 mi (0.048 km)	25 yd (23 m)	A trained spotter reported multiple brief touchdowns in open fields.
EF0	WSW of Nickerson	Reno	KS	38.1223°N 98.1649°W	00:12	0.03 mi (0.048 km)	25 yd (23 m)	Local broadcast media spotted a brief touchdown over open country.
EF0	WSW of Nickerson	Reno	KS	38.1279°N 98.1479°W	00:14	0.03 mi (0.048 km)	25 yd (23 m)	A brief tornado occurred over open fields.
EF0	WSW of Nickerson	Reno	KS	38.1334°N 98.1309°W	00:16	0.03 mi (0.048 km)	25 yd (23 m)	An off-duty NWS employee reported a few brief touchdowns in open country.
EF1	Flower Mound	Denton	TX	33.0132°N 97.163°W	00:19–00:22	2.5 mi (4.0 km)	50 yd (46 m)	Trees and homes were damaged near Lake Grapevine. The tornado continued deeper into the town where trees, fences and a stable also were damaged.
EF0	NW of Nickerson	Reno	KS	38.1602°N 98.093°W	00:29	0.03 mi (0.048 km)	25 yd (23 m)	A brief tornado touched down over open country.
EF1	S of Webb City	Franklin	AR	35.4439°N 93.83°W	00:43–00:45	1 mi (1.6 km)	100 yd (91 m)	A tornado tore damaged several homes, outbuildings and snapped or uprooted a number of trees

=== April 25 event ===
List of confirmed tornadoes – Wednesday, April 25, 2007
EF#	Location	County / Parish	State	Start Coord.	Time (UTC)	Path length	Max width	Summary
EF0	E of Oyster Creek	Brazoria	TX	29°N 95.2704°W	17:05	0.25 mi (0.40 km)	20 yd (18 m)	A brief tornado did no damage.
EF0	Near Assumption	Christian	IL	39.52°N 89.05°W	19:40	0.1 mi (0.16 km)	10 yd (9.1 m)	A landspout briefly touched down in a field. No damage was reported.
EF0	Near Alabama-Coushatta Reservation	Polk	TX	30.72°N 94.7°W	01:20	0.25 mi (0.40 km)	30 yd (27 m)	A tornado was spotted and no known damage occurred.

=== April 26 event ===
List of confirmed tornadoes –Thursday, April 26, 2007
EF#	Location	County / Parish	State	Start Coord.	Time (UTC)	Path length	Max width	Summary
EF0	Plainfield to Bolingbrook	Will	IL	41.6°N 88.2°W	19:58–20:09	3.2 mi (5.1 km)	5 yd (4.6 m)	A weak tornado caused minor damage to a nursing home, several houses, a construction trailer, and playground equipment. Lawn furniture and trampolines were blown away, and tree damage occurred as well. A van in a parking lot was flipped onto its side, with other nearby vehicles affected as well.
EF0	WNW of Crossville	Cumberland	TN	36.0092°N 85.2066°W	20:50–21:02	7.94 mi (12.78 km)	50 yd (46 m)	A mobile home had its roof torn off, a small wooden building was destroyed, a shed lost sections of metal roofing, trees were snapped, and a riding mower was thrown 200 yd (180 m) into a field.
EF1	E of Springville	LaPorte	IN	41.6789°N 86.693°W	21:08–21:11	0.5 mi (0.80 km)	100 yd (91 m)	A barn was destroyed, and two homes were damaged by falling trees and tree limbs.
EF1	ENE of Springville to SW of Hesston	LaPorte	IN	41.7006°N 86.6795°W	21:18–21:21	0.31 mi (0.50 km)	450 yd (410 m)	A patrol car was picked up and thrown 150 ft (46 m) feet over a fence. The police officer inside sustained minor injuries. In addition, numerous trees were uprooted or snapped off along the path. Two homes suffered damage in the area as well.
EF0	NE of Macon	Brown	OH	38.9802°N 83.7069°W	22:55–22:58	0.5 mi (0.80 km)	50 yd (46 m)	Trees were uprooted and limbs were snapped, a trampoline was tossed, the porch of a home was ripped off, and parts of the roof and siding of a barn were damaged.
EF1	W of Berrien Springs	Berrien	MI	41.9452°N 86.3961°W	23:12–23:15	1.24 mi (2.00 km)	50 yd (46 m)	Buildings sustained minor damage and trees were snapped.
EF1	S of Peebles	Adams	OH	38.9802°N 83.7069°W	23:23–23:27	1.5 mi (2.4 km)	50 yd (46 m)	A metal barn was destroyed, the roof was torn off of a house, and several trees were snapped.
EF1	WNW of Sunset to NNE of Hillsboro	Fleming	KY	38.286°N 83.6985°W	23:50–23:55	3.62 mi (5.83 km)	200 yd (180 m)	Three barns were destroyed, a concrete block grain silo was blown over, and trees were uprooted and snapped.
EF1	WNW of Tazewell to New Tazewell	Claiborne	TN	36.4572°N 83.5918°W	23:52–00:15	4.6 mi (7.4 km)	75 yd (69 m)	Multiple mobile homes were damaged, with one of them being rolled over and destroyed. Numerous trees were snapped and uprooted and homes sustained minor damage. 7 people were injured.
EF0	SW of Omega	Pike	OH	39.1296°N 82.9264°W	00:25–00:28	1 mi (1.6 km)	30 yd (27 m)	Two barns sustained minor damage and two trees were snapped.
EF0	WSW of Byers	Arapahoe	CO	39.6562°N 104.4201°W	01:02	0.1 mi (0.16 km)	50 yd (46 m)	A brief tornado occurred. No damage was noted.

=== April 27 event ===
List of confirmed tornadoes – Friday, April 27, 2007
EF#	Location	County / Parish	State	Start Coord.	Time (UTC)	Path length	Max width	Summary
EF0	N of Ark	Gloucester	VA	37.44°N 76.67°W	16:30–16:35	5.13 mi (8.26 km)	100 yd (91 m)	Numerous trees were snapped and uprooted, one of which landed on a house. Horse stables had their roofs blown off as well.
EF0	S of Hume	Bates	MO	38.0855°N 94.58°W	23:20–23:22	1.14 mi (1.83 km)	25 yd (23 m)	Minor tree damage occurred.
EF0	Metz to Walker	Barton	MO	38°N 94.45°W	23:30–00:00	12.92 mi (20.79 km)	25 yd (23 m)	A barn and numerous trees were damaged.

== See also ==
- Weather of 2007
- List of North American tornadoes and tornado outbreaks
- List of F4 and EF4 tornadoes
  - List of F4 and EF4 tornadoes (2000–2009)
- List of United States tornadoes in April 2007
