= List of United States tornadoes in April 2007 =

This page documents all the tornadoes that touched down in the United States in April 2007. Tornadoes in the month of January are given with their Fujita Scale intensity while all tornadoes from February and on are given with their Enhanced Fujita Scale intensity. This is because the scale was changed on February 1 due to the National Weather Service implementing a more accurate way to classify tornadoes.

== United States Yearly Total ==
Confirmed tornadoes by Enhanced Fujita rating
EFU	EF0	EF1	EF2	EF3	EF4	EF5	Total
0	675	298	91	27	4	1	1,096

- Note: January tornadoes were rated using the old Fujita scale, but are included in the chart above by matching the F rating to the related EF scale rating.

== April ==
Confirmed tornadoes by Enhanced Fujita rating
EFU	EF0	EF1	EF2	EF3	EF4	EF5	Total
0	99	52	11	2	1	0	165

=== April 3 event ===
List of confirmed tornadoes – Tuesday, April 3, 2007 (Note: All dates are based on the local time zone where the tornado touched down; however, all times are in Coordinated Universal Time for consistency.)
EF#	Location	County / Parish	State	Start Coord.	Time (UTC)	Path length	Max width	Summary
EF1	ESE of Nettleton	Craighead	AR	35.8089°N 90.6171°W	2354–2355	0.06 mi (0.097 km)	50 yd (46 m)	
EF0	S of Needham	Craighead	AR	35.794°N 90.53°W	2357	0.03 mi (0.048 km)	25 yd (23 m)	
EF0	SE of Spurlington	Taylor	KY	37.4062°N 85.2626°W	0001–0004	1.24 mi (2.00 km)	25 yd (23 m)	
EF1	NW of Dunnville to W of Mangum	Casey, Pulaski	KY	37.2409°N 85.05°W	0023–0040	13.77 mi (22.16 km)	200 yd (180 m)	
EF1	SE of Hogue	Pulaski	KY	37.1598°N 84.6872°W	0040–0045	0.1 mi (0.16 km)	25 yd (23 m)	
EF0	Arlington	Tarrant	TX	32.7°N 97.12°W	0120–0124	1 mi (1.6 km)	20 yd (18 m)	
EF1	ESE of London	Laurel	KY	37.1079°N 84.013°W	0128–0132	1.8 mi (2.9 km)	50 yd (46 m)	
EF1	NW of New Tazewell to S of Tazwell	Claiborne	TN	36.4811°N 83.6635°W	0215–0232	12 mi (19 km)	150 yd (140 m)	
EF1	NNW of Newton	Cumberland	TN	35.8401°N 85.2205°W	0216–0220	4.83 mi (7.77 km)	100 yd (91 m)	
EF0	S of Tway	Harlan	KY	36.8118°N 83.319°W	0217–0221	0.32 mi (0.51 km)	50 yd (46 m)	
EF0	NE of Cawood	Harlan	KY	36.7966°N 83.2052°W	0225–0229	1.18 mi (1.90 km)	50 yd (46 m)	
EF0	SW of Taft to WSW of Hazel Green	Lincoln (TN), Madison (AL)	TN, AL	34.9904°N 86.7662°W	0324–0337	9.27 mi (14.92 km)	50 yd (46 m)	
EF1	SSE of Davistown	Jackson	AL	34.5356°N 86.0128°W	0433–0435	2.57 mi (4.14 km)	100 yd (91 m)	

=== April 10 event ===
List of confirmed tornadoes – Tuesday, April 10, 2007
EF#	Location	County / Parish	State	Start Coord.	Time (UTC)	Path length	Max width	Summary
EF0	W of Ocean Ridge	Palm Beach	FL	26.52°N 80.08°W	2130–2135	0.62 mi (1.00 km)	75 yd (69 m)	

=== April 11 event ===
List of confirmed tornadoes – Wednesday, April 11, 2007
EF#	Location	County / Parish	State	Start Coord.	Time (UTC)	Path length	Max width	Summary
EF1	N of Sayre	Jefferson	AL	33.7502°N 86.98°W	2014–2016	0.57 mi (0.92 km)	40 yd (37 m)	
EF0	Knightsville	Clay	IN	39.53°N 87.1°W	2020–2022	0.1 mi (0.16 km)	50 yd (46 m)	
EF1	ENE of Randolph to W of Hubbard	Bibb, Chilton	AL	32.9096°N 86.8925°W	2047–2050	0.98 mi (1.58 km)	200 yd (180 m)	
EF0	ESE of North Salem	Hendricks	IN	39.8534°N 86.5978°W	2135–2137	0.1 mi (0.16 km)	50 yd (46 m)	
EF0	SE of Wetumpka	Elmore	AL	32.4806°N 86.1539°W	2205	0.09 mi (0.14 km)	25 yd (23 m)	
EF1	N of Dadeville	Tallapoosa	AL	32.8356°N 85.7567°W	2218–2220	0.9 mi (1.4 km)	50 yd (46 m)	
EF1	SW of Lizton to W of Pittsboro	Hendricks	IN	39.8596°N 86.5766°W	2237–2250	4.9 mi (7.9 km)	75 yd (69 m)	
EF1	SSW of Little Texas to WSW of Uchee	Macon, Russell	AL	32.365°N 85.6019°W	2254–2316	11.47 mi (18.46 km)	400 yd (370 m)	
EF2	E of Arcadia to WSW of Elwood	Hamilton, Tipton	IN	40.17°N 85.9632°W	2325–2331	4.1 mi (6.6 km)	100 yd (91 m)	

=== April 13 event ===
List of confirmed tornadoes – Friday, April 13, 2007
EF#	Location	County / Parish	State	Start Coord.	Time (UTC)	Path length	Max width	Summary
EF0	NE of Rule	Haskell	TX	33.22°N 99.87°W	18:45–18:50	0.9 mi (1.4 km)	30 yd (27 m)	Brief tornado crossed Highway 6 and caused no damage.
EF0	S of Seymour	Baylor	TX	33.5199°N 99.3098°W	19:38–19:48	6 mi (9.7 km)	880 yd (800 m)	This large wedge tornado remained over open country, though it was likely capable of causing major damage.
EF0	Benbrook	Tarrant	TX	32.6812°N 97.4586°W	22:55–22:57	1.5 mi (2.4 km)	30 yd (27 m)	A tornado damaged fences, trees, and street signs. The façade of a business was also slightly damaged.
EF1	Northern Fort Worth to Haltom City	Tarrant	TX	32.7704°N 97.3257°W	23:09–23:15	6 mi (9.7 km)	125 yd (114 m)	1 death - Substantial roof damage was done to a grocery store, several homes, and a church. Another church suffered steeple damage, and commercial buildings were also damaged, including one that sustained total collapse of an east-facing wall. Tractor-trailers were damaged or destroyed, and numerous trees and power lines were downed as well. Damage was $1 million.
EF0	Eastern Dallas	Dallas	TX	32.7921°N 96.7165°W	00:00–00:02	1 mi (1.6 km)	30 yd (27 m)	Several trees, tree limbs, and fences were downed in a residential area, and apartment buildings sustained roof damage.
EF0	S of Royse City	Rockwall, Hunt	TX	32.9077°N 96.3343°W	00:45–00:47	1.95 mi (3.14 km)	30 yd (27 m)	Two barns were destroyed and fences were downed.
EF0	SW of Greenville	Hunt	TX	33.0365°N 96.1662°W	00:53–00:54	0.1 mi (0.16 km)	30 yd (27 m)	Brief tornado caused damage to trees.

=== April 14 event ===
List of confirmed tornadoes – Saturday, April 14, 2007
EF#	Location	County / Parish	State	Start Coord.	Time (UTC)	Path length	Max width	Summary
EF0	Pinebur	Marion	MS	31.16°N 89.72°W	15:10–15:11	0.3 mi (0.48 km)	30 yd (27 m)	Trees were snapped and large limbs were blown down.
EF0	ESE of Oak Bowery	Jones	MS	31.6049°N 89.3572°W	15:35–15:36	0.27 mi (0.43 km)	25 yd (23 m)	Brief tornado remained in rural areas with no damage.
EF1	SE of Petal	Forrest	MS	31.3223°N 89.1918°W	1641–1642	0.5 mi (0.80 km)	50 yd (46 m)	One home had significant damage with the carport being destroyed and other damage to sidings, roof and windows. Trees were snapped or uprooted and a power pole also snapped.
EF1	S of Vredenburgh	Monroe	AL	31.8184°N 87.3154°W	18:33–18:36	1.06 mi (1.71 km)	200 yd (180 m)	Following a large microburst, a tornado damaged two churches and an old home had its roof blown off and was pushed off its foundation. Trees were downed in a convergent pattern.
EF0	NW of Saville	Crenshaw	AL	32.0302°N 86.3892°W	21:00–21:02	0.54 mi (0.87 km)	40 yd (37 m)	A rope tornado damaged the tin roofs of three buildings on a poultry farm. A church had shingles taken off and a tree fell onto the roof.
EF1	NNW of Castleberry	Conecuh	AL	31.3334°N 87.0362°W	22:12–22:14	0.25 mi (0.40 km)	50 yd (46 m)	One residence was damaged and trees were blown down.
EF1	W of Tanyard	Pike, Bullock	AL	31.8812°N 85.7189°W	23:11–23:15	3.2 mi (5.1 km)	100 yd (91 m)	One barn was destroyed and several homes had minor roof damage. Numerous trees were snapped and uprooted as well.
EF0	SW of Gilroy	Santa Clara	CA	36.9996°N 121.5956°W	00:05–00:06	0.2 mi (0.32 km)	30 yd (27 m)	A small tornado formed near Gavilan College, damaging an awning on a trailer and tore apart a large tree.
EF1	Northern Ozark	Dale	AL	31.4807°N 85.6862°W	00:05–00:12	5.83 mi (9.38 km)	150 yd (140 m)	A carport, two sheds, a barn and a greenhouse were destroyed. A residential gable collapsed, and several homes sustained moderate damage in the community of Post Oak. Trees were downed as well, including one that landed on a house.
EF0	N of Morgan	Calhoun	GA	31.5473°N 84.6003°W	01:45–01:47	0.83 mi (1.34 km)	50 yd (46 m)	One structure was damaged and numerous trees were knocked down.
EF1	NW of Leesburg	Lee	GA	31.7649°N 84.269°W	02:30–02:33	2.47 mi (3.98 km)	100 yd (91 m)	Fifteen structures were damaged, including a mobile home and a frame home being destroyed. Numerous trees and power lines were downed as well.

=== April 15 event ===
List of confirmed tornadoes – Sunday, April 15, 2007
EF#	Location	County / Parish	State	Start Coord.	Time (UTC)	Path length	Max width	Summary
EF1	Eastman	Dodge	GA	32.2061°N 83.1971°W	05:23–05:28	4.48 mi (7.21 km)	100 yd (91 m)	A greenhouse, an announcers booth at a football field and two mobile homes were destroyed. Several retain buildings sustained minor damage as well. One home was destroyed by a fallen tree, injuring both occupants. Numerous trees and power lines were downed, some of which landed on homes and caused damage.
EF2	NE of Rentz to S of Dublin	Laurens	GA	32.4165°N 82.9557°W	05:45–05:54	6.03 mi (9.70 km)	200 yd (180 m)	Two mobile homes and a greenhouse were destroyed. The carport of a site-built home was removed as well as a portion of the roof. Several other mobile homes and site-built homes sustained minor damage from wind and fallen trees. 3 people were injured.
EF0	NE of Cedar Grove	Laurens	GA	32.3034°N 82.8538°W	05:50–05:58	5.92 mi (9.53 km)	50 yd (46 m)	Outbuildings were damaged and numerous trees were downed.
EF1	SE of Orland to NW of Norristown Junction	Treutlen, Emanuel, Johnson	GA	32.4454°N 82.6817°W	06:04–06:18	11.53 mi (18.56 km)	440 yd (400 m)	One mobile home was rolled over and a utility building lost portions of its roof. About a dozen homes in Adrian were damaged. Two homes at a campground were also damaged due to fallen trees. In Orianna, two homes were heavily damaged and outbuildings were destroyed. A mobile home was also destroyed in Emanuel County near the end of the path.
EF1	SE of Dublin to NNW of Meeks	Laurens, Johnson	GA	32.4954°N 82.8709°W	06:05–06:24	19.03 mi (30.63 km)	100 yd (91 m)	Outbuildings were destroyed and numerous trees and power lines were downed. Several homes and a church sustained minor damage, and a family life center was shifted off of its foundation.
EF2	E of Twin City to SSW of Garfield	Emanuel	GA	32.5596°N 82.1457°W	06:56–07:01	5.39 mi (8.67 km)	200 yd (180 m)	Two homes lost a significant portion of their roofs and outer walls. A mobile home was also damaged and some nearby outbuildings were destroyed.
EF1	NNE of Oakfield to NE of Arabi	Worth, Crisp	GA	31.8053°N 83.9650°W	07:23–07:39	14.56 mi (23.43 km)	200 yd (180 m)	A home and several silos were damaged while trees and power lines were downed. A mobile home was also pushed off its foundation while a car was thrown into a guard rail on Interstate 75.
EF2	Southern Eastman	Dodge	GA	32.1855°N 83.1815°W	08:25–08:30	3.64 mi (5.86 km)	200 yd (180 m)	Two mobile homes, a barn and a garage were destroyed while several homes sustained minor to heavy damage.
EF2	NW of Baxter	Baker	FL	30.53°N 82.25°W	11:15–?	1.5 mi (2.4 km)	300 yd (270 m)	A house sustained minor damage and an outbuilding was destroyed. Widespread tree damage occurred as well.
EF0	NW of Ehrhardt to SE of Bamberg	Bamberg	SC	33.16°N 81.07°W	11:47–11:58	7.6 mi (12.2 km)	50 yd (46 m)	Damage to trees and power lines occurred.
EF0	E of Ehrhardt	Bamberg	SC	33.07°N 81.01°W	12:11–12:17	4.16 mi (6.69 km)	50 yd (46 m)	Damage was limited to trees.
EF3	NW of Pinewood to NW of Mayesville	Sumter	SC	33.7876°N 80.4987°W	12:20–12:41	19.04 mi (30.64 km)	300 yd (270 m)	1 death – Seven mobile homes were destroyed, nine frame homes were severely damaged while 62 mobile and frame homes were damaged at varying degrees. 5 other people were injured.
EF1	E of St. Charles	Lee	SC	33.7876°N 80.4987°W	12:50–12:54	3.64 mi (5.86 km)	200 yd (180 m)	Tornado downed numerous trees, a few powerlines, and did minor damage to a church and a mobile home.
EF0	SE of Rowesville to N of Bowman	Orangeburg	SC	33.31°N 80.75°W	13:37–13:45	6.21 mi (9.99 km)	50 yd (46 m)	Damage to trees and power lines occurred.
EF1	S of Islandton	Colleton	SC	32.8783°N 80.9304°W	13:38–13:39	1 mi (1.6 km)	60 yd (55 m)	Hundreds of trees and power lines were downed, and a large barn was destroyed with debris scattered up to a half-mile away. A house sustained window, brick veneer, and siding damage. A large 8,000 lb (3,600 kg) horse trailer was lifted up and carried 500 ft (150 m), and an 800-pound grain wagon was lifted and carried 400 ft (120 m). A bass boat was flipped over and a 4-wheeler was damaged along with other farm equipment. A tree also fell on a mobile home as well.
EF1	SE of Islandton	Colleton	SC	32.8917°N 80.9061°W	13:41–13:42	0.5 mi (0.80 km)	30 yd (27 m)	Tornado carried two empty grain silos about 100 ft (30 m), snapped off or uprooted dozens of trees, destroyed a large portion of an outbuilding, and severely injured a dog.
EF1	SW of Ruffin	Colleton	SC	32.9599°N 80.8198°W	13:44–13:48	2 mi (3.2 km)	80 yd (73 m)	Tornado overturned 3 mobile homes and shifted another 7 mobile homes off of their foundations. It tore the skirting away from another mobile home, destroyed a storage shed, and snapped off or uprooted dozens of trees. A couple of trees fell on a house. A vehicle and an outbuilding were also damaged. 9 people were injured.
EF1	NW of Summer Haven	St. Johns	FL	29.72°N 81.24°W	14:10	0.2 mi (0.32 km)	50 yd (46 m)	Boat house roofs were blown off, and trees were snapped. Buildings had windows blown out and pieces of lumber embedded into them. Signs were bent over at 45-degree angles.
EF0	Dundee	Polk	FL	28.0089°N 81.6503°W	16:00–16:03	2 mi (3.2 km)	300 yd (270 m)	Several manufactured homes were damaged to various degrees, and some were left uninhabitable.

=== April 17 event ===
List of confirmed tornadoes – Tuesday, April 17, 2007
EF#	Location	County / Parish	State	Start Coord.	Time (UTC)	Path length	Max width	Summary
EF0	NW of Shallowater	Lubbock	TX	33.7413°N 102.0537°W	18:25–18:35	2.5 mi (4.0 km)	70 yd (64 m)	
EF0	WNW of Slaton	Lubbock	TX	33.4411°N 101.682°W	18:40–18:50	1.25 mi (2.01 km)	50 yd (46 m)	
EF1	SW of Cotton Center	Hale	TX	33.9796°N 102.0247°W	18:57–19:03	2 mi (3.2 km)	100 yd (91 m)	
EF0	SSW of Friona	Parmer	TX	34.5499°N 102.7703°W	19:00–19:15	2.75 mi (4.43 km)	50 yd (46 m)	
EF0	Lubbock	Lubbock	TX	33.5662°N 101.8901°W	19:00–19:03	0.75 mi (1.21 km)	40 yd (37 m)	
EF0	NE of Lubbock	Lubbock	TX	33.6534°N 101.7719°W	19:03–19:04	0.25 mi (0.40 km)	50 yd (46 m)	
EF0	E of Keno	Klamath	OR	42.13°N 121.891°W	22:37–22:38	1 mi (1.6 km)	10 yd (9.1 m)	
EF0	E of Haslet	Tarrant	TX	32.97°N 97.3345°W	23:30–23:33	1.1 mi (1.8 km)	30 yd (27 m)	

=== April 20 event ===
List of confirmed tornadoes – Friday, April 20, 2007
EF#	Location	County / Parish	State	Start Coord.	Time (UTC)	Path length	Max width	Summary
EF3	ESE of Moorefield to SW of Brady	Frontier, Lincoln	NE	40.6966°N 100.277°W	02:16–02:46	15.74 mi (25.33 km)	440 yd (400 m)	An intense tornado began its damage by tearing the roof and attached garage off of a house, blowing the windows out of another, and destroying a third. Also in this area, the tornado destroyed grain bins and outbuildings, carried a horse trailer 50 yards, overturned irrigation pivots, scattered irrigation pipe, destroyed a wind mill, and pulled a fence line out of the ground. As the tornado entered Lincoln County, it destroyed a large storage building, removed the roof and an exterior wall from one home, and completely destroyed an unanchored home. Numerous trees and power poles were snapped along the path. Two people were injured when they were thrown 50 yd (46 m) from the unanchored home.
EF2	SSW of Gothenburg to SW of Callaway	Dawson, Custer	NE	41.0299°N 100.1647°W	03:02–03:40	18.92 mi (30.45 km)	1,320 yd (1,210 m)	This large wedge tornado injured nine people as it crossed Interstate 80, where several vehicles and semis were blown off the road. Nearly a dozen head of cattle were killed nearby, and a farmhouse lost half of its roof and had many windows blown out. The tornado then destroyed a barn, chicken house, milk house, an oil bin, and two dryer bins. Irrigation pivots were overturned, and numerous trees and power poles were snapped along the path.

=== April 21 event ===
List of confirmed tornadoes – Saturday, April 21, 2007
EF#	Location	County / Parish	State	Start Coord.	Time (UTC)	Path length	Max width	Summary
EF0	W of Littlefield	Lamb	TX	33.9208°N 102.4245°W	23:20–23:24	2 mi (3.2 km)	200 yd (180 m)	Weak tornado over open fields with no damage.
EF0	SE of Campo	Baca	CO	37.0489°N 102.5159°W	23:25–23:32	2.68 mi (4.31 km)	75 yd (69 m)	Tornado remained over open fields, causing no damage.
EF0	SW of Granada	Prowers	CO	37.9984°N 102.4109°W	23:25–23:35	3.05 mi (4.91 km)	300 yd (270 m)	Large, slow-moving tornado remained over open country with no damage.
EF1	NW of Boys Ranch to SE of Hartley	Oldham, Hartley	TX	35.5312°N 102.3211°W	23:51–00:27	17.13 mi (27.57 km)	880 yd (800 m)	Power poles, signs, and fences were damaged.
EF0	N of Bethune	Kit Carson	CO	39.4179°N 102.4704°W	23:54–23:55	0.5 mi (0.80 km)	10 yd (9.1 m)	A shed was lofted and flipped over, resulting in damage to a hay bailer and two grain bins.
EF2	N of Fieldton to NW of Kress	Lamb, Hale, Castro, Swisher	TX	34.0553°N 102.2226°W	23:57–00:36	28.75 mi (46.27 km)	1,230 yd (1,120 m)	In Lamb County, this long-tracked tornado damaged irrigation pivots and power poles, tore the roofs off of two brick buildings, heavily damaged five homes, destroyed lightweight metal structures, damaged farm equipment, and blew skirting from a mobile home as it passed near Olton. Irrigation pivots were destroyed and power poles were snapped in Hale, Castro, and Swisher Counties before the tornado dissipated. A dog and some livestock was killed, and one person was injured.
EF2	SW of Dumas to SE of Stratford	Moore, Sherman	TX	35.7947°N 102.1347°W	00:16–00:52	26.72 mi (43.00 km)	1,320 yd (1,210 m)	Large wedge tornado caused major damage in the town of Cactus. Ten mobile homes were destroyed with others heavily damaged. Many homes and businesses sustained varying degrees of damage. 14 people were injured.
EF0	SE of Plankinton	Aurora	SD	43.6791°N 98.4234°W	00:48–00:58	2.77 mi (4.46 km)	100 yd (91 m)	Tornado remained over open country with no damage.
EF2	E of Four Way to SE of Dumas	Moore	TX	35.6821°N 101.9166°W	00:50–01:15	11.83 mi (19.04 km)	704 yd (644 m)	Power poles were snapped, a fence was downed, and large hay bales were tossed around.
EF2	Tulia	Swisher	TX	34.5259°N 101.7822°W	00:57–01:01	3 mi (4.8 km)	200 yd (180 m)	30 homes and 20 businesses in Tulia were damaged or destroyed, with a supermarket and industrial buildings sustaining major damage. A storm chaser's vehicle was thrown into a brick building, and a semi-truck was blown into the chase vehicle. A collection of antique cars in a storage building were also damaged by the collapse of overhead doors and roof purlins, and 5 mobile homes were destroyed. A car dealership was heavily damaged, with 41 vehicles damaged by flying debris, and a motor home on the property was overturned. Damage and economic loss was estimated at $2 million. 3 people were injured.
EF0	E of Dumas	Moore	TX	35.8521°N 101.8273°W	01:06–01:08	1 mi (1.6 km)	50 yd (46 m)	Tornado remained over open country with no damage.
EF1	NE of Tulia	Swisher	TX	34.6529°N 101.7707°W	01:11–01:16	4 mi (6.4 km)	300 yd (270 m)	A large barn was heavily damaged.
EF0	W of Sunray	Moore	TX	34.6529°N 101.7707°W	01:19–01:23	1.53 mi (2.46 km)	100 yd (91 m)	Tornado remained over open country with no damage.
EF0	E of Happy	Swisher	TX	34.7303°N 101.5861°W	01:20–01:24	1.53 mi (2.46 km)	500 yd (460 m)	Large tornado remained over open country with no damage.
EF1	NE of Sunray to SE of Stratford	Moore, Sherman	TX	34.7303°N 101.5861°W	01:36–01:50	9.31 mi (14.98 km)	1,320 yd (1,210 m)	A barn was destroyed, hog barns sustained roof damage, and empty rail cars were overturned.
EF1	E of Wayside	Armstrong	TX	34.7511°N 101.5502°W	01:45–01:55	3.33 mi (5.36 km)	440 yd (400 m)	Damage was limited to power poles.
EF1	E of Dumas to SW of Sunray	Moore	TX	35.8511°N 101.8987°W	01:45–02:00	12.23 mi (19.68 km)	440 yd (400 m)	A feedyard sustained minor damage and double wooden power poles were snapped.
EF0	SE of Esmond	Kingsbury	SD	44.2257°N 97.6208°W	01:56–01:58	0.2 mi (0.32 km)	50 yd (46 m)	Brief tornado caused no damage.
EF0	SE of Lautz	Sherman	TX	36.0693°N 101.7447°W	01:58–02:12	7.97 mi (12.83 km)	700 yd (640 m)	Large tornado remained over open country with no damage.
EF1	SW of Sunray	Moore	TX	35.9587°N 101.8058°W	01:59–02:02	2 mi (3.2 km)	704 yd (644 m)	Property damage occurred and double wooden power poles were snapped.
EF1	SE of Canyon	Randall	TX	34.82671°N 101.7331°W	02:00–02:15	10.7 mi (17.2 km)	880 yd (800 m)	Tornado damaged power poles and farm structures. A horse was killed.
EF2	NE of Claude to SE of Panhandle	Armstrong, Carson	TX	35.16981°N 101.2231°W	02:35–03:10	12.88 mi (20.73 km)	440 yd (400 m)	Power poles were damaged while tractors, turbines, vehicles and cotton presser box cars were moved and/or tossed, some for considerable distances.
EF0	E of Claude	Armstrong	TX	35.1208°N 101.1933°W	02:40–03:45	4.21 mi (6.78 km)	50 yd (46 m)	Tornado remained over open country with no damage.
EF1	W of Alanreed to SW of Kings Mill	Gray	TX	35.1208°N 101.1933°W	02:50–03:10	12.7 mi (20.4 km)	50 yd (46 m)	A house lost part of its roof, power poles were snapped, and storage buildings and outbuildings were destroyed.

=== April 22 event ===
List of confirmed tornadoes – Sunday, April 22, 2007
EF#	Location	County / Parish	State	Start Coord.	Time (UTC)	Path length	Max width	Summary
EF0	SW of Osmond	Pierce	NE	42.3393°N 97.6215°W	19:43–19:44	0.5 mi (0.80 km)	100 yd (91 m)	No damage occurred as a tornado remained over open country.

=== April 23 event ===
List of confirmed tornadoes – Monday, April 23, 2007
EF#	Location	County / Parish	State	Start Coord.	Time (UTC)	Path length	Max width	Summary
EF0	SSW of Buffalo	Harper	OK	36.7231°N 99.6753°W	23:14	0.2 mi (0.32 km)	30 yd (27 m)	NWS employees and storm chasers observed a brief and small tornado.
EF0	NE of Laverne	Harper	OK	36.7609°N 99.849°W	23:51	0.2 mi (0.32 km)	30 yd (27 m)	An off-duty NWS meteorologist observed a tornado.
EF0	E of Colorado City	Mitchell	TX	32.4°N 100.7815°W	00:43–00:56	4 mi (6.4 km)	50 yd (46 m)	A tornado damaged a field irrigation system, power poles, vegetation, and signs along I-20.
EF1	E of Sharon Springs	Wallace	KS	38.88°N 101.6743°W	00:47–01:25	12 mi (19 km)	50 yd (46 m)	Power poles were broken.
EF0	N of Wallace	Wallace	KS	38.9923°N 101.58°W	01:03–01:18	5 mi (8.0 km)	75 yd (69 m)	A tornado remained over open fields and did no known damage.
EF0	SE of Sitka	Clark	KS	37.0947°N 99.5682°W	01:04–01:08	1.4 mi (2.3 km)	50 yd (46 m)	A tornado tracked northeast across open land.
EF0	SW of Janus	Mitchell, Nolan	TX	32.4022°N 100.6629°W	01:04–01:06	0.58 mi (0.93 km)	50 yd (46 m)	A cone tornado remained over open land.
EF0	S of Del Rio	Val Verde	TX	29.3122°N 100.9°W	01:06–01:08	0.2 mi (0.32 km)	20 yd (18 m)	Staff from the Del Rio Fire and Rescue observed a small tornado in an open area doing no damage.
EF1	SE of Sitka	Clark	KS	37.1159°N 99.5587°W	01:10–01:35	7.8 mi (12.6 km)	150 yd (140 m)	Trees, power poles and a small shed were damaged. The tornado was a twin to the tornado below.
EF0	WSW of Protection	Comanche	KS	37.186°N 99.5354°W	01:22–01:34	1.7 mi (2.7 km)	75 yd (69 m)	A tornado did minor damage to some trees and was a twin to the previous tornado.
EF0	Val Verde Park	Val Verde	TX	29.37°N 100.8336°W	01:34–01:37	1 mi (1.6 km)	30 yd (27 m)	A sheriff's deputy watched a rope tornado damage ten homes and mobile homes. The tornado also knocked over telephone poles and tossed outbuildings.
EF0	WNW of Protection	Comanche	KS	37.2151°N 99.5219°W	01:37–01:41	1.63 mi (2.62 km)	50 yd (46 m)	A tornado remained over open pasture land.
EF0	NW of Sweetwater	Nolan	TX	32.49°N 100.4602°W	02:00–02:03	0.9 mi (1.4 km)	50 yd (46 m)	A tornado occurred over open country.
EF0	NNE of Trent	Taylor	TX	32.5089°N 100.1158°W	02:20–02:22	0.34 mi (0.55 km)	50 yd (46 m)	A tornado was briefly observed.
EF0	SSE of Brewster	Thomas	KS	39.2899°N 101.3371°W	02:38–02:59	6 mi (9.7 km)	25 yd (23 m)	An empty grain bin was destroyed, several trees were uprooted and minor home damage occurred.
EF0	W of Hodges	Jones	TX	32.58°N 99.91°W	02:41–02:46	0.68 mi (1.09 km)	50 yd (46 m)	A tornado was observed for several minutes.
EF0	NE of Goodland	Sherman	KS	39.4569°N 101.5875°W	03:02–03:04	0.5 mi (0.80 km)	10 yd (9.1 m)	A tornado was spotted from the National Weather Service office in Goodland as it remained over open fields.
EF1	NW of Levant to SSW of Atwood	Thomas, Rawlins	KS	39.4158°N 101.2463°W	03:15–04:15	15.5 mi (24.9 km)	50 yd (46 m)	Power pole and tree damage occurred.
EF1	S of Atwood	Rawlins	KS	39.5687°N 101.05°W	04:15–04:39	12.5 mi (20.1 km)	100 yd (91 m)	A high-end EF1 removed the roof off a home, destroyed many outbuildings, grain bins and trees. An irrigation system as also damaged.
EF1	SE of Atwood	Rawlins	KS	39.6978°N 100.917°W	04:44–04:59	6 mi (9.7 km)	75 yd (69 m)	Power poles were broken and a farmstead had an outbuilding damaged.
EF0	N of Wray	Yuma	CO	40.2969°N 102.23°W	04:49–04:50	0.5 mi (0.80 km)	10 yd (9.1 m)	A tornado remained over open fields, causing no damage.
EF0	SE of Holyoke	Phillips	CO	40.44°N 102.12°W	05:00	0.1 mi (0.16 km)	50 yd (46 m)	A brief tornado caused no damage.
EF0	SW of Enders	Chase	NE	40.3836°N 101.6173°W	05:15–05:16	0.5 mi (0.80 km)	20 yd (18 m)	A weak tornado touched down briefly in open rangeland.
EF0	SW of Enders	Chase	NE	40.3887°N 101.6106°W	05:16–05:17	0.25 mi (0.40 km)	20 yd (18 m)	A trained spotter reported a weak tornado over open land.

=== April 24 event ===
List of confirmed tornadoes – Tuesday, April 24, 2007
EF#	Location	County / Parish	State	Start Coord.	Time (UTC)	Path length	Max width	Summary
EF0	Eastern Wild Horse	Cheyenne	CO	38.82°N 103°W	17:58–17:59	0.5 mi (0.80 km)	10 yd (9.1 m)	A brief tornado damaged the doors on a quonset hut, a trailer was pushed over and the cross on a church received minor damage.
EF0	W of Wild Horse	Cheyenne	CO	38.82°N 103.0557°W	18:15–18:25	4 mi (6.4 km)	25 yd (23 m)	A tornado remained over open fields.
EF0	WNW of Wild Horse to SE of Boyero	Cheyenne, Lincoln	CO	38.8532°N 103.1029°W	18:38–18:46	2 mi (3.2 km)	50 yd (46 m)	No known damage occurred as a small tornado remained over open fields.
EF0	SE of Boyero	Lincoln	CO	38.87°N 103.19°W	18:58	0.1 mi (0.16 km)	50 yd (46 m)	A tornado occurred over open land.
EF1	ESE of Granbury	Hood	TX	32.3836°N 97.6101°W	19:00–19:02	0.5 mi (0.80 km)	50 yd (46 m)	A tornado moved through Pecan Plantation, causing damage to trees and homes. One brick home had portions of its roof removed, the garage door blown in and windows broken.
EF0	WSW of Lincoln Park	Denton	TX	33.22°N 97.0118°W	19:20–19:22	1 mi (1.6 km)	50 yd (46 m)	The roof of a restaurant was damaged. Tree limbs were snapped and a gas station sign was also damaged.
EF1	NNE of Cheyenne Wells	Cheyenne	CO	38.9001°N 102.3074°W	19:26–19:36	4.5 mi (7.2 km)	25 yd (23 m)	A single power pole was broken.
EF0	NE of Arapahoe	Cheyenne	CO	38.9011°N 102.1043°W	19:37–19:45	4 mi (6.4 km)	25 yd (23 m)	A tornado remained over open fields.
EF0	NW of Weskan	Wallace	KS	38.9007°N 102.0094°W	19:48–19:49	0.5 mi (0.80 km)	10 yd (9.1 m)	
EF0	NNE of Arapahoe	Cheyenne	CO	38.9569°N 102.1131°W	19:55–20:14	5 mi (8.0 km)	50 yd (46 m)	A cone tornado was reported by a storm chaser. The tornado did no damage as it remained over open fields.
EF0	NW of Cheyenne Wells	Cheyenne	CO	39.004°N 102.5865°W	20:00–20:01	0.5 mi (0.80 km)	10 yd (9.1 m)	A tornado caused no damage over open fields.
EF0	NW of Cheyenne Wells	Cheyenne	CO	39.0858°N 102.6918°W	20:00–20:01	0.5 mi (0.80 km)	10 yd (9.1 m)	No known damage occurred.
EF0	WNW of Pawhuska	Osage	OK	36.7032°N 96.4299°W	20:27–20:35	5.5 mi (8.9 km)	100 yd (91 m)	A storm chaser for a local station reported a tornado over open country.
EF0	W of Golden City	Barton	MO	37.3796°N 94.1257°W	23:20–23:21	2.83 mi (4.55 km)	25 yd (23 m)	A weak tornado caused minor damage to three outbuildings.
F4	Piedras Negras, COA to E of Rosita, TX	Piedras Negras (COA), Maverick (TX)	COA, TX	28.67°N 100.58°W	23:45–00:10	13.67 mi (22.00 km)	1,094 yd (1,000 m)	10 deaths – A violent tornado touched down in the Acoros neighborhood of Piedras Negras. The tornado tracked southeast inflicting damage to numerous buildings before entering the Villa de Fuente neighborhood, where the worst damage occurred. Well-built masonry buildings were destroyed in this area, cars were thrown and mangled, and trees were debarked. In Piedras Negras overall, 611 homes had serious damage and 208 were considered total losses. 3 people died and 153 were injured in Mexico. The tornado then crossed the Rio Grande into the United States and struck the Rosita neighborhood in Eagle Pass. An elementary school was destroyed, and two nearby brick businesses were left with only interior walls standing. Numerous homes and mobile homes were destroyed as well, some of which were leveled or swept away. A total of 59 manufactured homes and 57 houses were destroyed by the tornado in and around Rosita. Major damage was reported to 21 manufactured homes and 19 houses, with minor damage to 10 manufactured homes, 22 houses, and 9 apartments. 7 fatalities and eighty injuries occurred along the American portion of the damage path of this tornado. The Mexican section of the path was given an F4 rating while the American section of the path was given an EF3 rating.
EF0	SW of Nickerson	Reno	KS	38.0784°N 98.171°W	00:01	0.03 mi (0.048 km)	25 yd (23 m)	A brief tornado touched down in open country.
EF0	SW of Nickerson	Reno	KS	38.0887°N 98.158°W	00:09	0.03 mi (0.048 km)	25 yd (23 m)	A trained spotter reported multiple brief touchdowns in open fields.
EF0	WSW of Nickerson	Reno	KS	38.1223°N 98.1649°W	00:12	0.03 mi (0.048 km)	25 yd (23 m)	Local broadcast media spotted a brief touchdown over open country.
EF0	WSW of Nickerson	Reno	KS	38.1279°N 98.1479°W	00:14	0.03 mi (0.048 km)	25 yd (23 m)	A brief tornado occurred over open fields.
EF0	WSW of Nickerson	Reno	KS	38.1334°N 98.1309°W	00:16	0.03 mi (0.048 km)	25 yd (23 m)	An off-duty NWS employee reported a few brief touchdowns in open country.
EF1	Flower Mound	Denton	TX	33.0132°N 97.163°W	00:19–00:22	2.5 mi (4.0 km)	50 yd (46 m)	Trees and homes were damaged near Lake Grapevine. The tornado continued deeper into the town where trees, fences and a stable also were damaged.
EF0	NW of Nickerson	Reno	KS	38.1602°N 98.093°W	00:29	0.03 mi (0.048 km)	25 yd (23 m)	A brief tornado touched down over open country.
EF1	S of Webb City	Franklin	AR	35.4439°N 93.83°W	00:43–00:45	1 mi (1.6 km)	100 yd (91 m)	A tornado tore damaged several homes, outbuildings and snapped or uprooted a number of trees

=== April 25 event ===
List of confirmed tornadoes – Wednesday, April 25, 2007
EF#	Location	County / Parish	State	Start Coord.	Time (UTC)	Path length	Max width	Summary
EF0	E of Oyster Creek	Brazoria	TX	29°N 95.2704°W	17:05	0.25 mi (0.40 km)	20 yd (18 m)	A brief tornado did no damage.
EF0	Near Assumption	Christian	IL	39.52°N 89.05°W	19:40	0.1 mi (0.16 km)	10 yd (9.1 m)	A landspout briefly touched down in a field. No damage was reported.
EF0	Near Alabama-Coushatta Reservation	Polk	TX	30.72°N 94.7°W	01:20	0.25 mi (0.40 km)	30 yd (27 m)	A tornado was spotted and no known damage occurred.

=== April 26 event ===
List of confirmed tornadoes –Thursday, April 26, 2007
EF#	Location	County / Parish	State	Start Coord.	Time (UTC)	Path length	Max width	Summary
EF0	Plainfield to Bolingbrook	Will	IL	41.6°N 88.2°W	19:58–20:09	3.2 mi (5.1 km)	5 yd (4.6 m)	A weak tornado caused minor damage to a nursing home, several houses, a construction trailer, and playground equipment. Lawn furniture and trampolines were blown away, and tree damage occurred as well. A van in a parking lot was flipped onto its side, with other nearby vehicles affected as well.
EF0	WNW of Crossville	Cumberland	TN	36.0092°N 85.2066°W	20:50–21:02	7.94 mi (12.78 km)	50 yd (46 m)	A mobile home had its roof torn off, a small wooden building was destroyed, a shed lost sections of metal roofing, trees were snapped, and a riding mower was thrown 200 yd (180 m) into a field.
EF1	E of Springville	LaPorte	IN	41.6789°N 86.693°W	21:08–21:11	0.5 mi (0.80 km)	100 yd (91 m)	A barn was destroyed, and two homes were damaged by falling trees and tree limbs.
EF1	ENE of Springville to SW of Hesston	LaPorte	IN	41.7006°N 86.6795°W	21:18–21:21	0.31 mi (0.50 km)	450 yd (410 m)	A patrol car was picked up and thrown 150 ft (46 m) feet over a fence. The police officer inside sustained minor injuries. In addition, numerous trees were uprooted or snapped off along the path. Two homes suffered damage in the area as well.
EF0	NE of Macon	Brown	OH	38.9802°N 83.7069°W	22:55–22:58	0.5 mi (0.80 km)	50 yd (46 m)	Trees were uprooted and limbs were snapped, a trampoline was tossed, the porch of a home was ripped off, and parts of the roof and siding of a barn were damaged.
EF1	W of Berrien Springs	Berrien	MI	41.9452°N 86.3961°W	23:12–23:15	1.24 mi (2.00 km)	50 yd (46 m)	Buildings sustained minor damage and trees were snapped.
EF1	S of Peebles	Adams	OH	38.9802°N 83.7069°W	23:23–23:27	1.5 mi (2.4 km)	50 yd (46 m)	A metal barn was destroyed, the roof was torn off of a house, and several trees were snapped.
EF1	WNW of Sunset to NNE of Hillsboro	Fleming	KY	38.286°N 83.6985°W	23:50–23:55	3.62 mi (5.83 km)	200 yd (180 m)	Three barns were destroyed, a concrete block grain silo was blown over, and trees were uprooted and snapped.
EF1	WNW of Tazewell to New Tazewell	Claiborne	TN	36.4572°N 83.5918°W	23:52–00:15	4.6 mi (7.4 km)	75 yd (69 m)	Multiple mobile homes were damaged, with one of them being rolled over and destroyed. Numerous trees were snapped and uprooted and homes sustained minor damage. 7 people were injured.
EF0	SW of Omega	Pike	OH	39.1296°N 82.9264°W	00:25–00:28	1 mi (1.6 km)	30 yd (27 m)	Two barns sustained minor damage and two trees were snapped.
EF0	WSW of Byers	Arapahoe	CO	39.6562°N 104.4201°W	01:02	0.1 mi (0.16 km)	50 yd (46 m)	A brief tornado occurred. No damage was noted.

=== April 27 event ===
List of confirmed tornadoes – Friday, April 27, 2007
EF#	Location	County / Parish	State	Start Coord.	Time (UTC)	Path length	Max width	Summary
EF0	N of Ark	Gloucester	VA	37.44°N 76.67°W	16:30–16:35	5.13 mi (8.26 km)	100 yd (91 m)	Numerous trees were snapped and uprooted, one of which landed on a house. Horse stables had their roofs blown off as well.
EF0	S of Hume	Bates	MO	38.0855°N 94.58°W	23:20–23:22	1.14 mi (1.83 km)	25 yd (23 m)	Minor tree damage occurred.
EF0	Metz to Walker	Barton	MO	38°N 94.45°W	23:30–00:00	12.92 mi (20.79 km)	25 yd (23 m)	A barn and numerous trees were damaged.

=== April 29 event ===
List of confirmed tornadoes – Sunday, April 29, 2007
EF#	Location	County / Parish	State	Start Coord.	Time (UTC)	Path length	Max width	Summary
EF0	Fort Davis	Jeff Davis	TX	30.5466°N 103.8639°W	16:40–16:54	3.5 mi (5.6 km)	300 yd (270 m)	
EF0	SW of Valentine	Jeff Davis	TX	30.5596°N 104.5237°W	17:07–17:12	1.38 mi (2.22 km)	50 yd (46 m)	
EF0	NNW of Fort Davis	Jeff Davis	TX	30.8071°N 103.9894°W	17:58–18:03	1.5 mi (2.4 km)	50 yd (46 m)	
EF0	W of Las Cruces	Doña Ana	NM	32.32°N 107.2248°W	20:05–20:10	0.1 mi (0.16 km)	10 yd (9.1 m)	

=== April 30 event ===
List of confirmed tornadoes – Monday, April 30, 2007
EF#	Location	County / Parish	State	Start Coord.	Time (UTC)	Path length	Max width	Summary
EF0	SSW of Dimmitt	Castro	TX	34.3497°N 102.4206°W	17:20–17:23	0.2 mi (0.32 km)	50 yd (46 m)	
EF0	SSW of Wantz	McMullen	TX	28.11°N 98.62°W	21:35–21:40	0.49 mi (0.79 km)	50 yd (46 m)	
EF0	SW of Ballinger	Runnels	TX	31.6929°N 99.9969°W	01:10–01:14	1.37 mi (2.20 km)	350 yd (320 m)	

== See also ==
- Tornadoes of 2007
- List of United States tornadoes in March 2007
- List of United States tornadoes in May 2007
