= Colorado State Highway 94 =

State highway in Colorado, United States

State Highway 94
- SH 94 highlighted in red

Route information
- Maintained by CDOT
- Length: 85.57 mi (137.71 km)

Major junctions
- West end: US 24 near Colorado Springs
- SH 71 at Punkin Center
- East end: US 40 / US 287 near Wild Horse

Location
- Country: United States
- State: Colorado
- Counties: El Paso, Lincoln, Cheyenne

Highway system
- Colorado State Highway System; Interstate; US; State; Scenic
← SH 92	→ SH 95

State Highway 94 (SH 94) is an 85.5-mile-long (137.6 km) east–west Colorado state highway that goes east beginning from US 24 just east of Colorado Springs and ending at U.S. Highway 40/U.S. Highway 287 in rural Cheyenne County west of Wild Horse. The highway serves Schriever Air Force Base and the towns of Ellicott, Yoder, and Rush, where it then crosses through rural country. It also serves the Punkin Center area where it comes to a junction with SH 71. It then passes through more very rural country until it reaches a stop at US 40/287 west of the unincorporated town of Wild Horse.

Throughout most of its length, the highway runs due east–west, pointing exactly at Pikes Peak. Under good conditions, the peak can be seen as far east as the rise between mileposts 78 and 79.

"Garbage Hill" gets its name from the Colorado Springs landfill located north of the highway. Originally, the entrance to the landfill was partway up the hill, but currently the entrance is from Blaney Road at the top of the hill. At the bottom of the hill, which is the eastern side of Jimmy Camp Creek valley, there are wrecking yards and two motocross tracks. This hill is one of the most severe hills on Highway 94, having a climbing lane.

Ellicott, Colorado is located along State Highway 94, is the last location for travelers going eastbound to re-fuel, as there are no gas services for the rest of the highways length.

== History ==
The route was established in the 1920s, with the eastern end swerving north then east, ending at Boyero. By 1954, the eastern end no longer swerved north, and by 1970 the eastern end was extended to US 40/287 near Aroya with the entire highway paved.

In September 2020, the Colorado Department of Transportation began work on an $11 million construction project on the segment between US 24 and Enoch Road as part of a larger project to improve mobility for the military installations in the Colorado Springs metropolitan area to improve safety, including a westbound passing lane and a reverse jughandle intersection and traffic signal at Blaney Road South. The projects on SH 94 were completed in June 2023.

== Major intersections ==
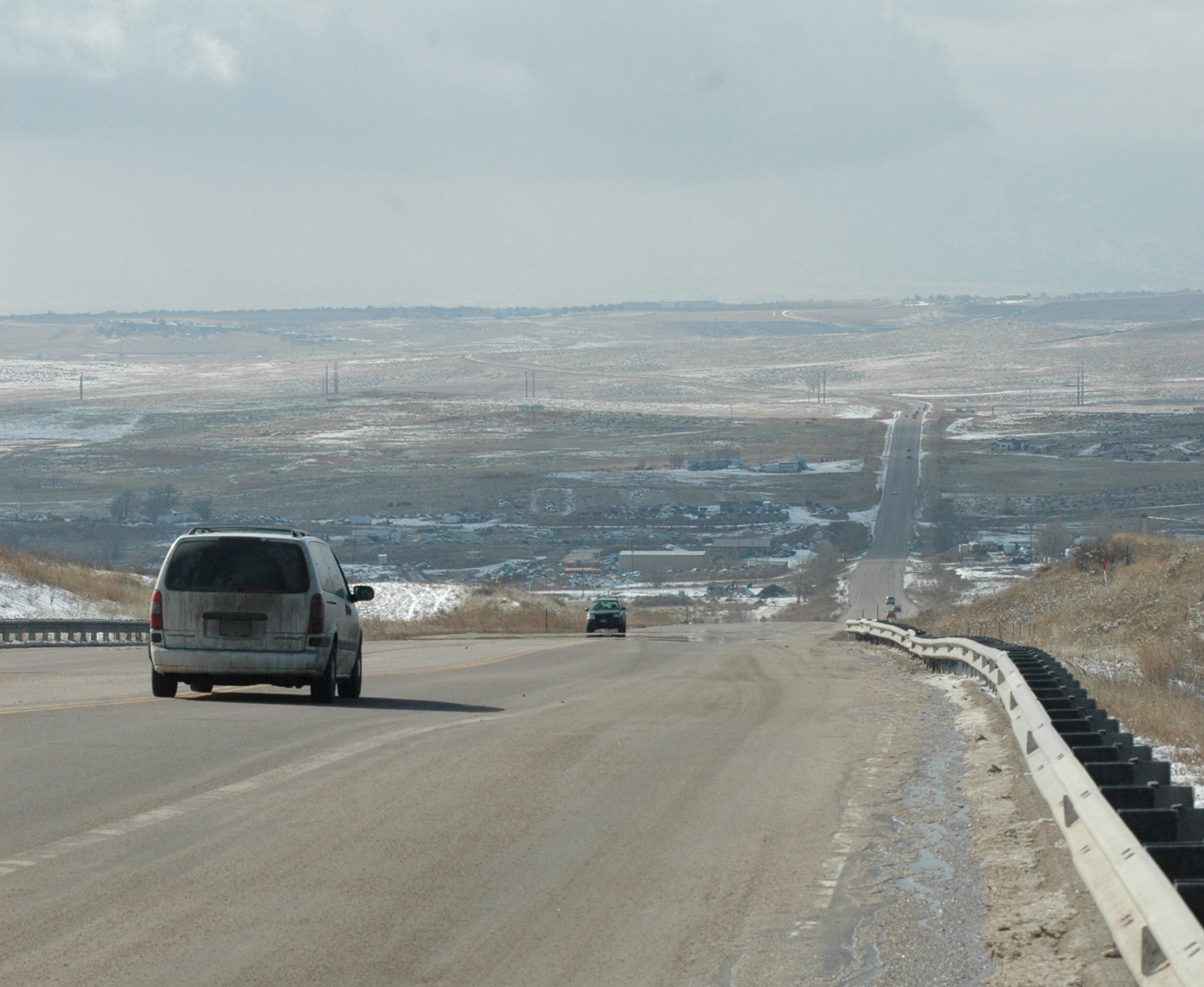
Looking west down "Garbage Hill" several miles outside Colorado Springs.

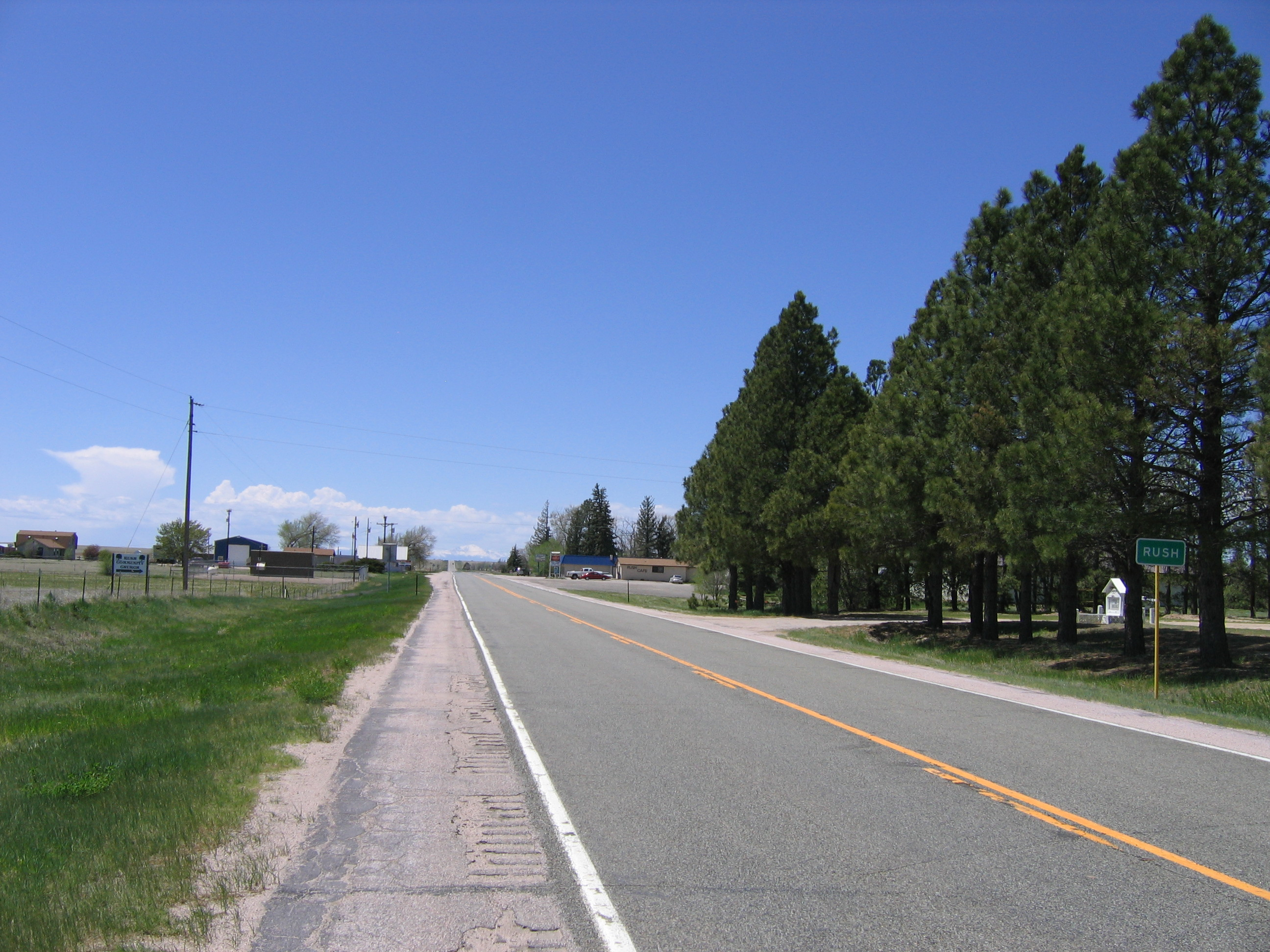
Looking west in Rush, Pikes Peak is in the distance.

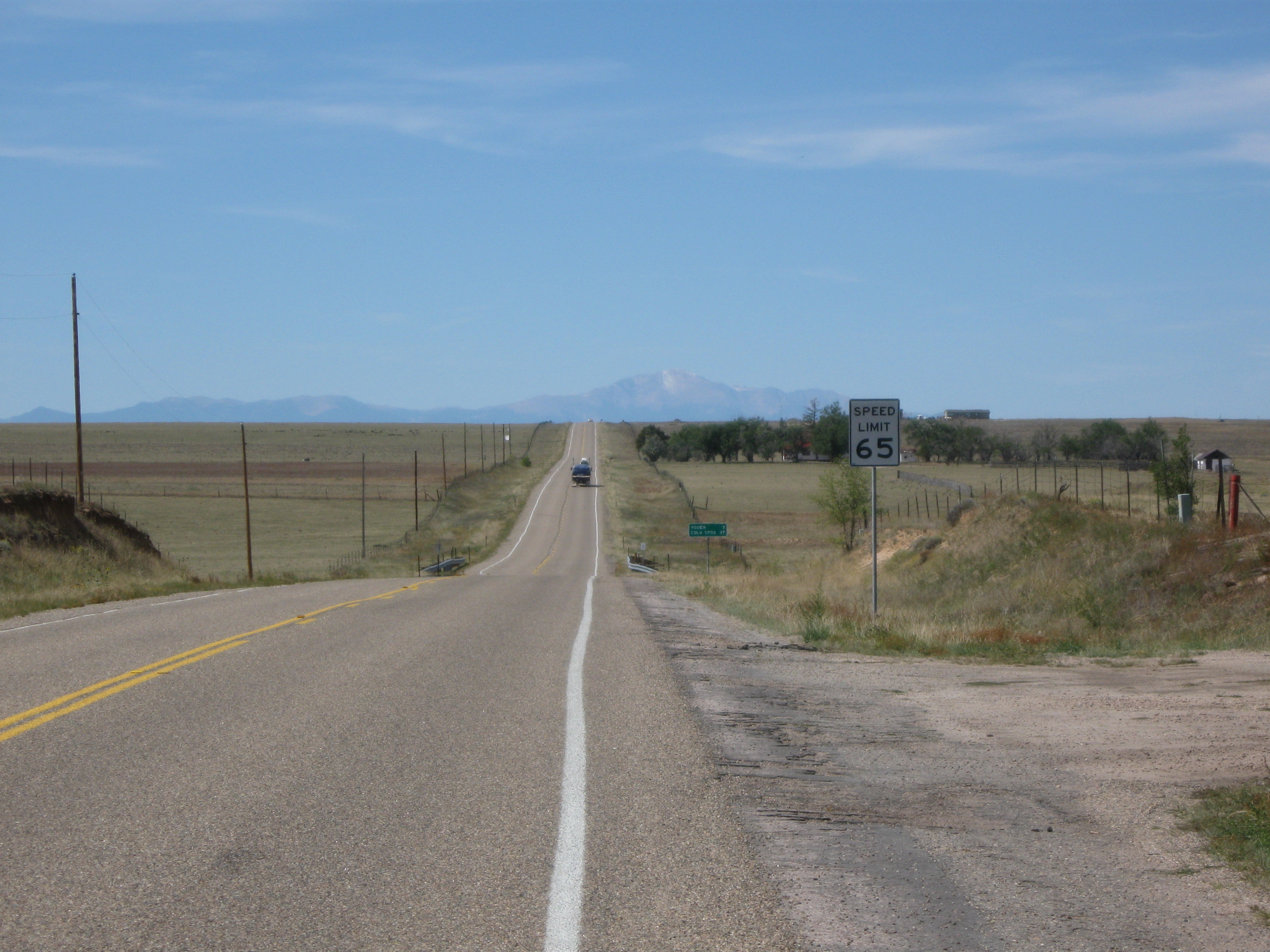
SH 94 looking west with Pikes Peak in the background.

County	Location	mi	km	Destinations	Notes
El Paso	Colorado Springs	0	0.0	US 24 – Colorado Springs, Falcon	Western terminus
Lincoln	Punkin Center	54.5	87.7	SH 71 – Limon, Ordway	
Cheyenne		86	138	US 40 / US 287 – Limon, Kit Carson, Hugo, Wild Horse	Eastern terminus
1.000 mi = 1.609 km; 1.000 km = 0.621 mi
