= Wild Horse Creek (Colorado) =

Stream in Colorado, U.S.

Coordinates: 38°46′05″N 102°48′11″W

Wild Horse Creek is a stream in the U.S. state of Colorado.

Wild Horse Creek was named for the wild horses which roamed along its course.
