= Omega, Ohio =

Unincorporated community in Pike County, Ohio

Coordinates: 39°09′06″N 82°54′37″W

Omega (formerly Sharonville) is an unincorporated community in eastern Jackson Township, Pike County, Ohio, United States. A post office called Omega opened in 1837 and closed in 1935.

A nearby bridge carrying Ohio State Route 335 over the Scioto River was called the Omega Bridge. The Omega Cemetery is located just outside the community to the west.
