= Wild Horse, Colorado =

Unincorporated community in Cheyenne County, CO, USA

- Unincorporated community
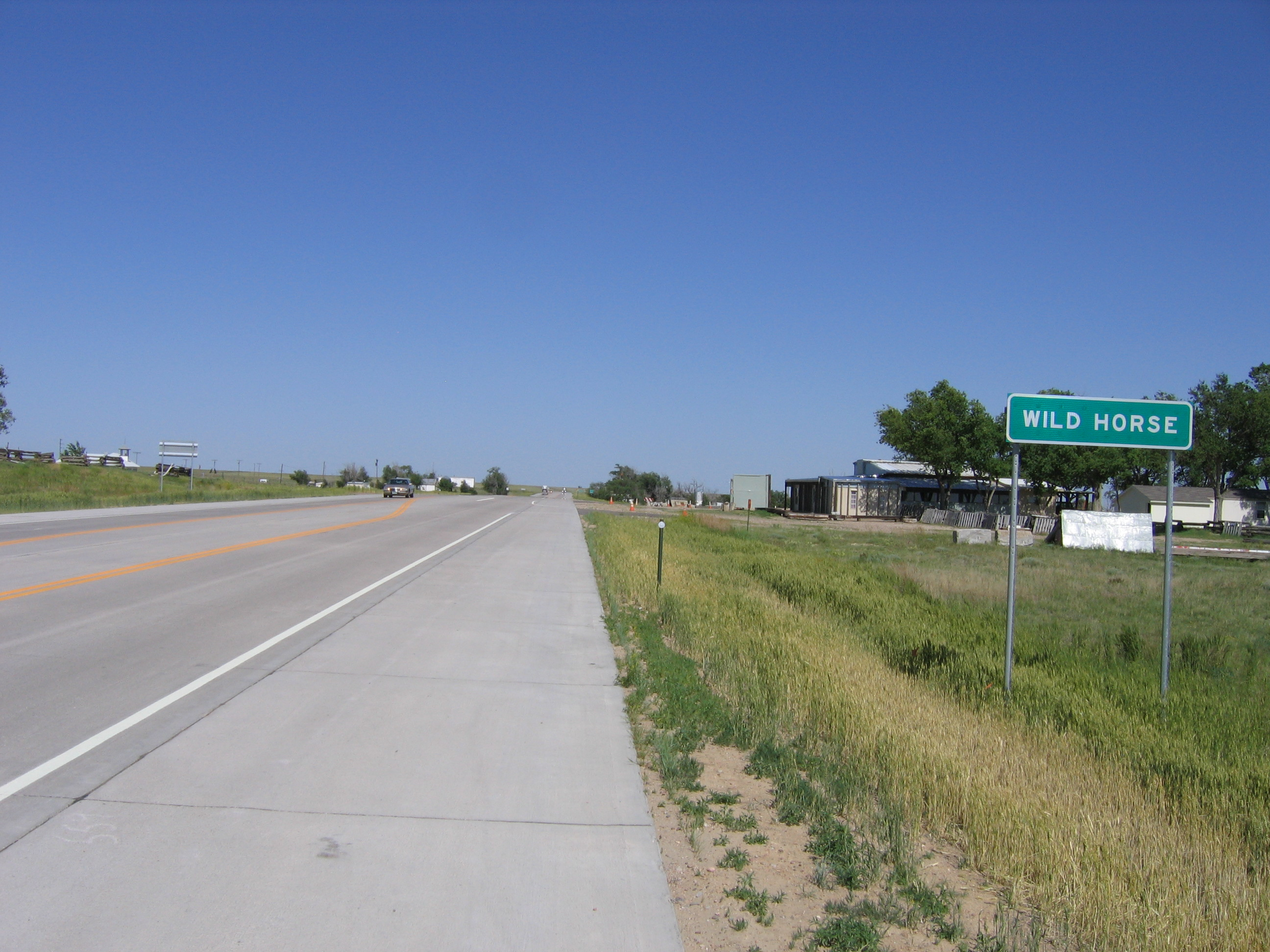
- View from U.S. Highway 40/287 (2007)

- Location within Colorado Location within the United States
- Coordinates: 38°49′33″N 103°00′42″W
- Country: United States
- State: Colorado
- County: Cheyenne
- Elevation: 4,475 ft (1,364 m)
- Time zone: UTC−7 (MST)
  - Summer (DST): UTC−6 (MDT)
- ZIP Code: 80862
- Area code: 719
- FIPS code: 08-84915
- GNIS ID: 195193

Wild Horse is an unincorporated community in Cheyenne County, Colorado, United States.

== History ==
The community takes its name from Wild Horse Creek, and began in 1869 as a cavalry outpost, which soon became a railway station and had expanded to a town by the mid-1870s. After a peak of population and business activities in the early 1900s, the town began dwindling by 1917, when most of it burned down in a great fire. The town rebuilt, but never at the population or business-service centralization level of its earlier years, and by the 1930s, had begun to dwindle further.

There is still a post office at Wild Horse, which has been in operation since 1904. and currently services ZIP Code 80862. There is also a one-room school house, no longer in use, and a cluster of older small homes.

== Popular culture ==
Wild Horse is the home of the United States Space Force in the Netflix comedy series Space Force, although the series was not actually filmed in the village.
