= Cheyenne County, Colorado =

County in Colorado, United States

- County
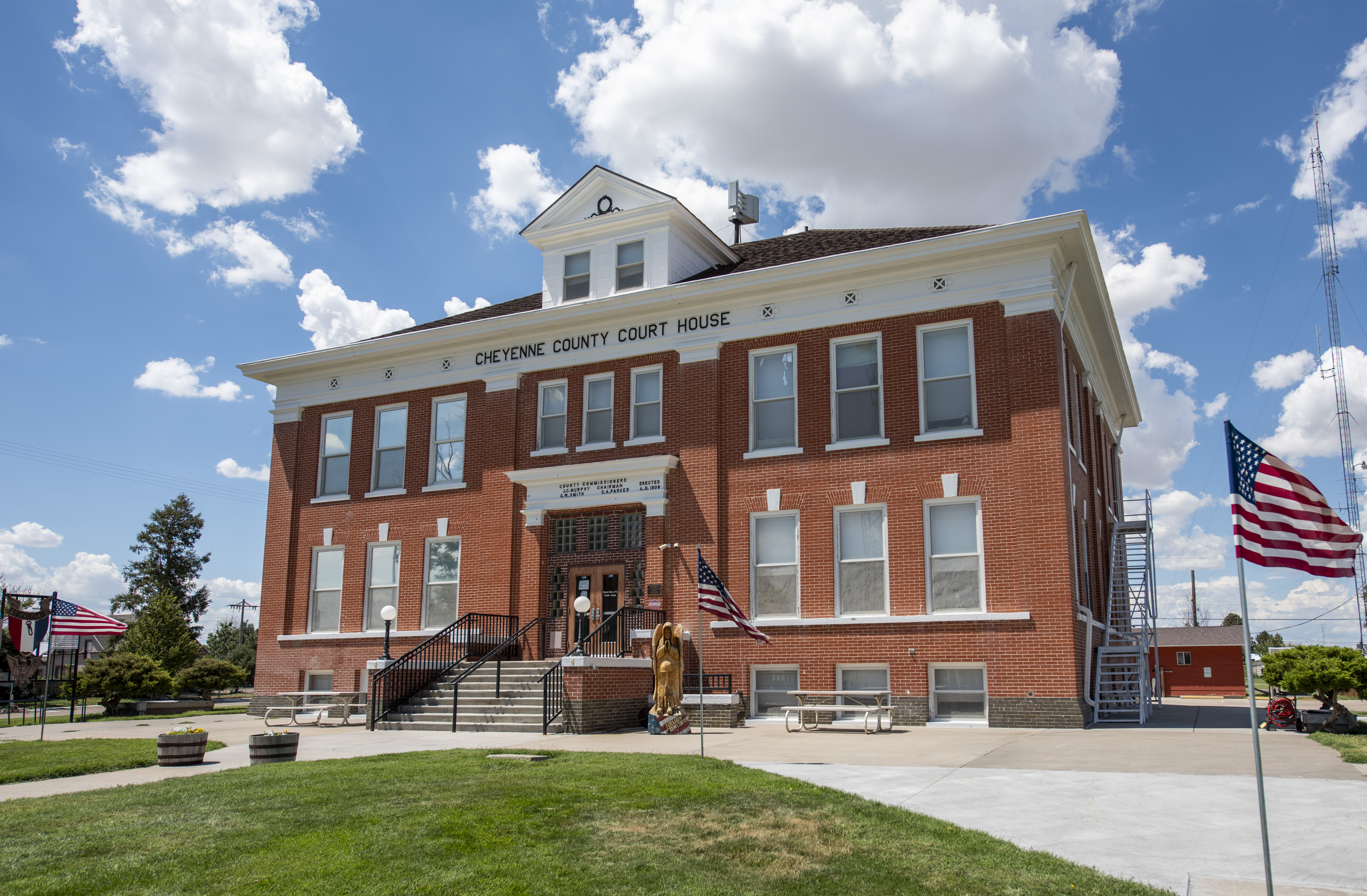
- Cheyenne County Colorado Courthouse

- Location within the U.S. state of Colorado
- Coordinates: 38.82°N 102.59°W
- Country: United States
- State: Colorado
- Founded: March 25, 1889
- Named for: The Cheyenne Nation
- Seat: Cheyenne Wells
- Largest town: Cheyenne Wells

Area
  - Total: 1,781 sq mi (4,610 km^{2})
  - Land: 1,778 sq mi (4,600 km^{2})
  - Water: 3.2 sq mi (8.3 km^{2}) 0.2%

Population (2020)
  - Total: 1,748
  - Estimate (2025): 1,713 ▼
  - Density: 0.9831/sq mi (0.3796/km^{2})
- Time zone: UTC−7 (Mountain)
  - Summer (DST): UTC−6 (MDT)
- Congressional district: 4th
- Website: www.co.cheyenne.co.us

Cheyenne County is a county located in the U.S. state of Colorado. The county population was 1,748 at 2020 census. The county seat is Cheyenne Wells.

== History ==
Cheyenne County was created with its present borders by the Colorado State Legislature on March 25, 1889, out of portions of northeastern Bent County and southeastern Elbert County. It was named after the Cheyenne Indians who occupied eastern Colorado.

== Geography ==
According to the U.S. Census Bureau, the county has a total area of 1,781 square miles (4,610 km^{2}), of which 1,778 square miles (4,600 km^{2}) is land and 3.2 square miles (8.3 km^{2}) (0.2%) is water.

The drainage basins in Cheyenne County include Bellyache, Big Timber, East and Middle Fork Big Spring, Eureka, Goose, Ladder, Little Spring, Pass, Rock, Sand, Turtle, White Woman, Wild Horse and Willow Creeks, as well as the Smoky Hill River. The Smoky Hill drains into the Republican River in Kansas. The creeks in the northern and eastern part of the county drain to the Republican or Smoky Hill Rivers; those in the central and southeastern part of the county drain ultimately to the Arkansas River. All of the creeks in Cheyenne County are generally dry with some flow when drawing snowmelt or rainfall. There are four summits in Cheyenne County: Agate Mound (4,457 ft.), Eureka Hill (4,700 ft.), Landsman Hill (4,695 ft.), and Twin Buttes (4,621 ft.) The highest point in the county is in the extreme northwest corner of the county on the Bledsoe Ranch (5,255 ft.)

=== Adjacent counties ===
- Kit Carson County (north)
- Wallace County, Kansas (east)
- Greeley County, Kansas (southeast)
- Lincoln County (west)
- Kiowa County (south)

=== Major highways ===
- U.S. Highway 40
- U.S. Highway 287
- U.S. Highway 385
- State Highway 59
- State Highway 94

=== Antipode ===
Cheyenne County is home to the antipode of Île Saint-Paul making it one of the few places in the continental United States with a non-oceanic antipode.

== Demographics ==
Historical population
Census	Pop.	Note	%±
1890	534		—
1900	501		−6.2%
1910	3,687		635.9%
1920	3,746		1.6%
1930	3,723		−0.6%
1940	2,964		−20.4%
1950	3,453		16.5%
1960	2,789		−19.2%
1970	2,396		−14.1%
1980	2,153		−10.1%
1990	2,397		11.3%
2000	2,231		−6.9%
2010	1,836		−17.7%
2020	1,748		−4.8%
2025 (est.)	1,713	▼	−2.0%
U.S. Decennial Census; 1790-1960 1900-1990; 1990-2000 2010-2020

=== 2020 census ===
As of the 2020 census, the county had a population of 1,748. Of the residents, 23.5% were under the age of 18 and 22.4% were 65 years of age or older; the median age was 44.0 years. For every 100 females there were 100.0 males, and for every 100 females age 18 and over there were 100.6 males. 0.0% of residents lived in urban areas and 100.0% lived in rural areas.

Cheyenne County, Colorado – Racial and ethnic composition Note: the US Census treats Hispanic/Latino as an ethnic category. This table excludes Latinos from the racial categories and assigns them to a separate category. Hispanics/Latinos may be of any race.
Race / Ethnicity (NH = Non-Hispanic)	Pop 2000	Pop 2010	Pop 2020	% 2000	% 2010	% 2020
White alone (NH)	2,018	1,617	1,470	90.45%	88.07%	84.10%
Black or African American alone (NH)	9	7	1	0.40%	0.38%	0.06%
Native American or Alaska Native alone (NH)	9	11	5	0.40%	0.60%	0.29%
Asian alone (NH)	3	10	3	0.13%	0.54%	0.17%
Pacific Islander alone (NH)	0	1	0	0.00%	0.05%	0.00%
Other race alone (NH)	1	0	3	0.04%	0.00%	0.17%
Mixed race or Multiracial (NH)	10	12	60	0.45%	0.65%	3.43%
Hispanic or Latino (any race)	181	178	206	8.11%	9.69%	11.78%
Total	2,231	1,836	1,748	100.00%	100.00%	100.00%

The racial makeup of the county was 87.8% White, 0.1% Black or African American, 0.7% American Indian and Alaska Native, 0.2% Asian, 0.0% Native Hawaiian and Pacific Islander, 4.8% from some other race, and 6.4% from two or more races. Hispanic or Latino residents of any race comprised 11.8% of the population.

There were 745 households in the county, of which 26.2% had children under the age of 18 living with them and 23.2% had a female householder with no spouse or partner present. About 33.9% of all households were made up of individuals and 14.3% had someone living alone who was 65 years of age or older.

There were 925 housing units, of which 19.5% were vacant. Among occupied housing units, 73.8% were owner-occupied and 26.2% were renter-occupied. The homeowner vacancy rate was 1.1% and the rental vacancy rate was 9.2%.

=== 2000 census ===
As of the census of 2000, there were 2,231 people, 880 households, and 602 families residing in the county. The population density was 1 people per square mile (0.39 people/km^{2}). There were 1,105 housing units at an average density of 1 units per square mile (0.39 units/km^{2}). The racial makeup of the county was 92.87% White, 0.49% Black or African American, 0.76% Native American, 0.13% Asian, 5.11% from other races, and 0.63% from two or more races. 8.11% of the population were Hispanic or Latino of any race.

There were 880 households, out of which 34.10% had children under the age of 18 living with them, 59.30% were married couples living together, 5.70% had a female householder with no husband present, and 31.50% were non-families. 29.00% of all households were made up of individuals, and 12.40% had someone living alone who was 65 years of age or older. The average household size was 2.50 and the average family size was 3.12.

In the county, the population was spread out, with 28.80% under the age of 18, 7.10% from 18 to 24, 26.20% from 25 to 44, 21.30% from 45 to 64, and 16.60% who were 65 years of age or older. The median age was 38 years. For every 100 females there were 100.60 males. For every 100 females age 18 and over, there were 98.40 males.

The median income for a household in the county was $37,054, and the median income for a family was $44,394. Males had a median income of $32,250 versus $19,286 for females. The per capita income for the county was $17,850. About 8.70% of families and 11.10% of the population were below the poverty line, including 12.90% of those under age 18 and 10.90% of those age 65 or over.

== Communities ==
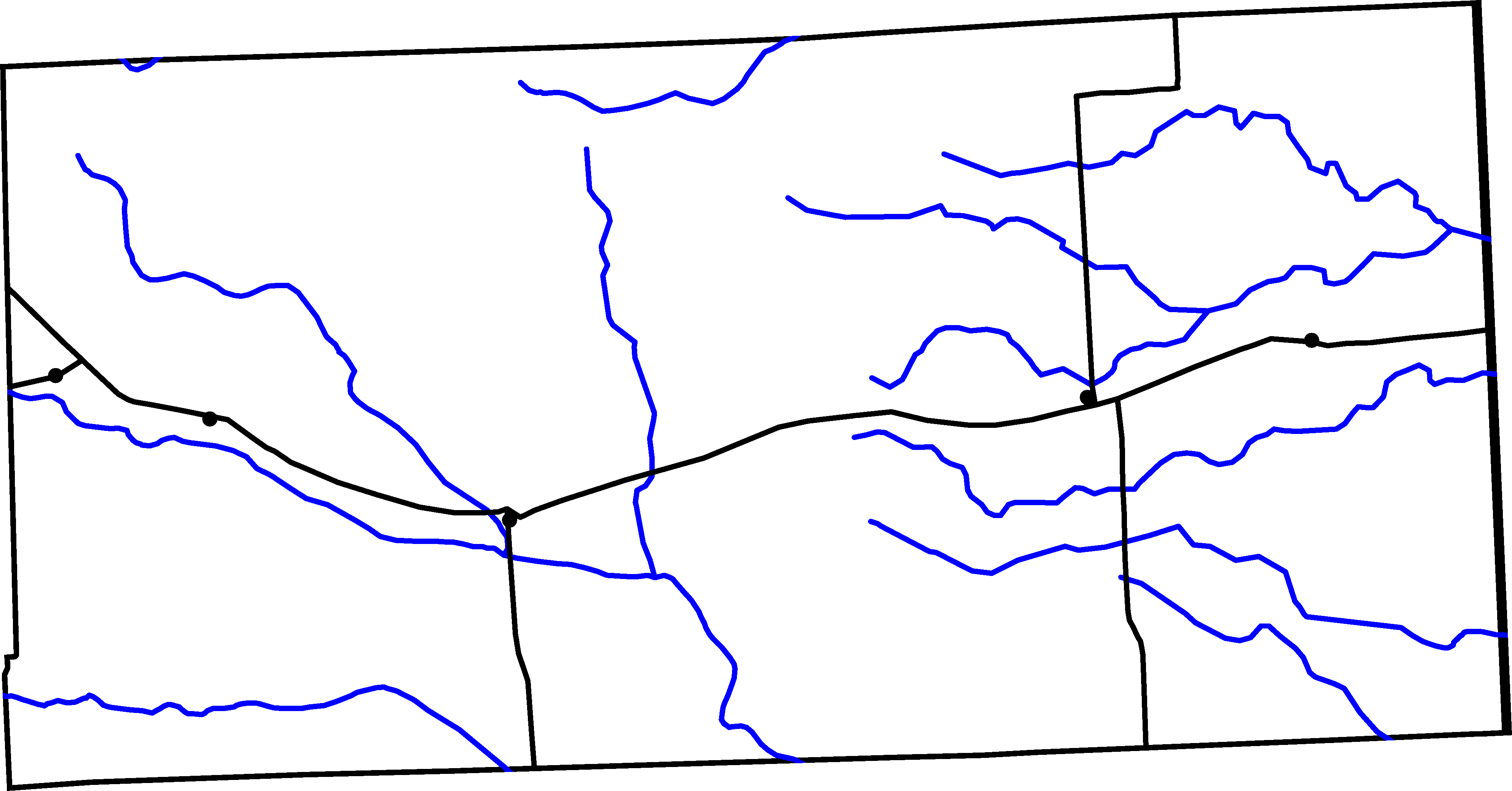
Cheyenne County, Colorado

=== Towns ===
- Cheyenne Wells
- Kit Carson

=== Census Designated Place ===
- Arapahoe

=== Unincorporated communities ===
- Wild Horse

== Politics ==
United States presidential election results for Cheyenne County, Colorado
Year	Republican		Democratic		Third party(ies)	
Year	No.	%	No.	%	No.	%
1892	102	66.67%	0	0.00%	51	33.33%
1896	87	45.55%	104	54.45%	0	0.00%
1900	128	56.39%	97	42.73%	2	0.88%
1904	145	65.91%	69	31.36%	6	2.73%
1908	445	54.33%	331	40.42%	43	5.25%
1912	237	17.66%	507	37.78%	598	44.56%
1916	558	38.38%	802	55.16%	94	6.46%
1920	840	64.57%	358	27.52%	103	7.92%
1924	875	55.70%	236	15.02%	460	29.28%
1928	945	63.85%	500	33.78%	35	2.36%
1932	746	39.41%	1,042	55.04%	105	5.55%
1936	767	44.85%	903	52.81%	40	2.34%
1940	915	54.43%	758	45.09%	8	0.48%
1944	923	60.68%	594	39.05%	4	0.26%
1948	657	47.40%	713	51.44%	16	1.15%
1952	1,004	65.97%	515	33.84%	3	0.20%
1956	820	61.70%	507	38.15%	2	0.15%
1960	806	65.69%	419	34.15%	2	0.16%
1964	545	42.48%	735	57.29%	3	0.23%
1968	664	55.70%	392	32.89%	136	11.41%
1972	815	63.37%	400	31.10%	71	5.52%
1976	610	48.15%	625	49.33%	32	2.53%
1980	816	65.86%	322	25.99%	101	8.15%
1984	892	73.23%	307	25.21%	19	1.56%
1988	760	64.08%	399	33.64%	27	2.28%
1992	615	50.74%	301	24.83%	296	24.42%
1996	739	62.84%	328	27.89%	109	9.27%
2000	957	78.96%	209	17.24%	46	3.80%
2004	923	81.39%	198	17.46%	13	1.15%
2008	890	80.11%	198	17.82%	23	2.07%
2012	889	81.34%	172	15.74%	32	2.93%
2016	925	83.94%	132	11.98%	45	4.08%
2020	993	87.41%	131	11.53%	12	1.06%
2024	930	88.15%	108	10.24%	17	1.61%

United States Senate election results for Cheyenne County, Colorado2
Year	Republican		Democratic		Third party(ies)	
Year	No.	%	No.	%	No.	%
2020	995	88.44%	119	10.58%	11	0.98%

United States Senate election results for Cheyenne County, Colorado3
Year	Republican		Democratic		Third party(ies)	
Year	No.	%	No.	%	No.	%
2022	763	83.21%	120	13.09%	34	3.71%

Colorado Gubernatorial election results for Cheyenne County
Year	Republican		Democratic		Third party(ies)	
Year	No.	%	No.	%	No.	%
2022	758	82.84%	115	12.57%	42	4.59%

Since the 1920s, Cheyenne County has mostly supported Republican candidates in presidential elections. In the 27 presidential elections since 1920, the Democratic presidential candidates have carried the county only five times, none have broken 60% of the vote, and only Lyndon Johnson in 1964, and Franklin Delano Roosevelt in 1932 won the county by a double-digit margin. By contrast, the Republican nominees have carried the county 22 times, including the last twelve in a row, with all except Wendell Willkie in 1940 winning by at least a double-digit margin. The four most recent GOP presidential candidates George W. Bush, John McCain, Mitt Romney, and Donald Trump all carried Cheyenne county with over 80% of the vote.

== Historic Trails ==
- Old Military Trail - This trail connected Fort Wallace (on the Smoky Hill River in Kansas) to Fort Lyon (on the Arkansas River in Colorado).
- Omaha Trail - This trail came from Kansas into northeast Cheyenne County and merged with the Smoky Hill Trail east of Cheyenne Wells.
- Smoky Hill Trail - The Smoky Hill Trail is also called the Butterfield Trail and the Starvation Trail. It followed the Smoky Hill River, crossing Cheyenne County from east to west. Lt. John C. Fremont is known to have used this trail as early as 1844. When gold was discovered on Cherry Creek in 1859, the trail was promoted as the most direct route to Denver from the Nebraska and Kansas Territories. The route was treacherous and earned the name "Starvation Trail." David Butterfield established the Butterfield Overland Dispatch along this trail. The area was Indian hunting grounds. Several military forts were established along the trail to protect travelers. The Kansas Pacific Railway followed this trail through Kansas. The trail split near "Old Wells" (about five miles north of present-day Cheyenne Wells) into north and south forks. The north fork of the trail went northwest from "Old Wells" Station through Deering Wells Station, Big Springs Station, and David Wells Station and eventually to Denver. The south fork was first surveyed in 1860, and again in 1865. The south fork ran southwest from Old Wells through Eureka Station to Dubois Station. Then it headed northwest to Grady Station. The two forks joined up again near Hugo.
- Texas-Montana Cattle Trail - This trail was used during the Civil War. It ran south to north across Cheyenne County through Big Springs Station.

== Historic Sites ==
- Cheyenne County Courthouse in Cheyenne Wells. The courthouse was built in 1908 and is listed on the National Register of Historic Places.
- Old Cheyenne County Jail in Cheyenne Wells. The jail was built in 1894 and used as a jail until 1961. The structure is listed on the National Register of Historic Places. The jail was designed by noted Colorado architect Robert Roeschlaub, who designed the Central City Opera House and other historic structures in Colorado. The Old Cheyenne County Jail is now a historical museum.
- The Historic Plains Hotel in Cheyenne Wells. Built in 1919, the hotel is still used as a hotel.
- Mountain States Telephone & Telegraph Building in Cheyenne Wells. The building's entablature frieze simply says "Telephone" in block letters. The building, constructed in 1927, is currently a museum.
- Kit Carson Pool Hall in Kit Carson.
- Union Pacific Pumphouse in Kit Carson. Built in about 1880, the stone pumphouse was used by Union Pacific Railroad's steam locomotives.
- Wild Horse Mercantile in the town of Wild Horse. Built after the 1917 fire, the store was in continuous operation into the late 1960s.
- Wild Horse School in the town of Wild Horse. The school was built in 1912.

== See also ==
- Bibliography of Colorado
- Geography of Colorado
- History of Colorado
  - National Register of Historic Places listings in Cheyenne County, Colorado
- Index of Colorado-related articles
- List of Colorado-related lists
  - List of counties in Colorado
- Outline of Colorado
