= Val Verde Park, Texas =

- Census-designated place
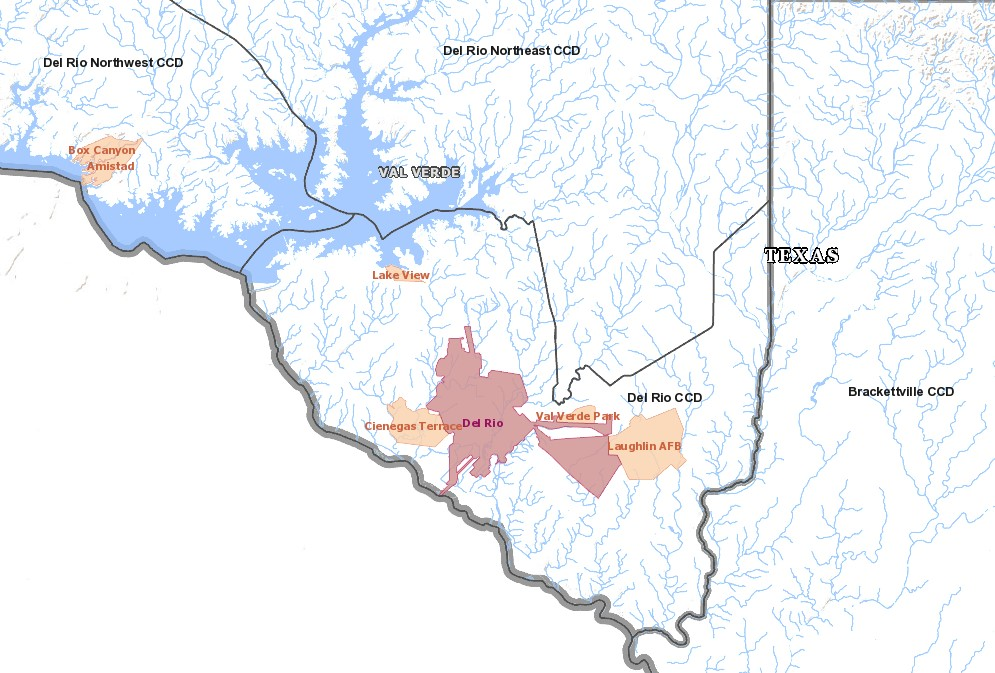

- Location within the state of Texas
- Coordinates: 29°22′33″N 100°49′43″W
- Country: United States
- State: Texas
- County: Val Verde

Area
  - Total: 0.81 sq mi (2.1 km^{2})
  - Land: 0.81 sq mi (2.1 km^{2})
  - Water: 0 sq mi (0.0 km^{2})
- Elevation: 1,083 ft (330 m)

Population (2020)
  - Total: 2,332
  - Density: 2,900/sq mi (1,100/km^{2})
- Time zone: UTC-6 (Central (CST))
  - Summer (DST): UTC-5 (CDT)
- Zip Code: 78840
- FIPS code: 48-74895
- GNIS feature ID: 2409389

Val Verde Park is a census-designated place (CDP) in Val Verde County, Texas, United States. As of the 2020 census, Val Verde Park had a population of 2,332.

== Geography ==
According to the United States Census Bureau, the CDP has a total area of 0.8 square mile (2.1 km^{2}), all land.

== Demographics ==
Historical population
Census	Pop.	Note	%±
2010	2,384		—
2020	2,332		−2.2%
U.S. Decennial Census; 1850–1900 1910; 1920 1930 1940; 1950 1960 1970; 1980 1990 2000; 2010 2020

Val Verde Park first appeared as a census designated place in the 2010 U.S. census.

=== 2020 census ===
Val Verde Park CDP, Texas – Racial and ethnic composition Note: the US Census treats Hispanic/Latino as an ethnic category. This table excludes Latinos from the racial categories and assigns them to a separate category. Hispanics/Latinos may be of any race.
Race / Ethnicity (NH = Non-Hispanic)	Pop 2010	Pop 2020	% 2010	% 2020
White alone (NH)	176	136	7.38%	5.83%
Black or African American alone (NH)	10	8	0.42%	0.34%
Native American or Alaska Native alone (NH)	2	0	0.08%	0.00%
Asian alone (NH)	1	9	0.04%	0.39%
Native Hawaiian or Pacific Islander alone (NH)	1	0	0.04%	0.00%
Other race alone (NH)	0	6	0.00%	0.26%
Mixed race or Multiracial (NH)	6	3	0.25%	0.13%
Hispanic or Latino (any race)	2,188	2,170	91.78%	93.05%
Total	2,384	2,332	100.00%	100.00%

As of the 2020 United States census, there were 2,332 people, 861 households, and 730 families residing in the CDP.

=== 2000 census ===
As of the census of 2000, there were 1,945 people, 521 households, and 451 families residing in the CDP. The population density was 2,386.1 inhabitants per square mile (921.3/km^{2}). There were 590 housing units at an average density of 723.8 per square mile (279.5/km^{2}). The racial makeup of the CDP was 66.68% White, 0.72% African American, 0.82% Native American, 0.05% Pacific Islander, 29.00% from other races, and 2.72% from two or more races. Hispanic or Latino of any race were 86.79% of the population.

There were 521 households, out of which 57.0% had children under the age of 18 living with them, 69.9% were married couples living together, 11.7% had a female householder with no husband present, and 13.4% were non-families. 12.3% of all households were made up of individuals, and 3.6% had someone living alone who was 65 years of age or older. The average household size was 3.73 and the average family size was 4.08.

In the CDP, the population was spread out, with 39.1% under the age of 18, 11.0% from 18 to 24, 27.5% from 25 to 44, 15.9% from 45 to 64, and 6.6% who were 65 years of age or older. The median age was 25 years. For every 100 females, there were 105.0 males. For every 100 females age 18 and over, there were 97.8 males.

The median income for a household in the CDP was $29,211, and the median income for a family was $32,984. Males had a median income of $21,161 versus $15,104 for females. The per capita income for the CDP was $7,893. About 25.3% of families and 25.9% of the population were below the poverty line, including 26.1% of those under age 18 and 36.7% of those age 65 or over.

== Education ==
Val Verde Park is served by the San Felipe Del Rio Consolidated Independent School District.

Val Verde County is served by Southwest Texas Junior College, according to the Texas Education Code.
