= Ark, Virginia =

Unincorporated community in Virginia, United States

- Unincorporated community
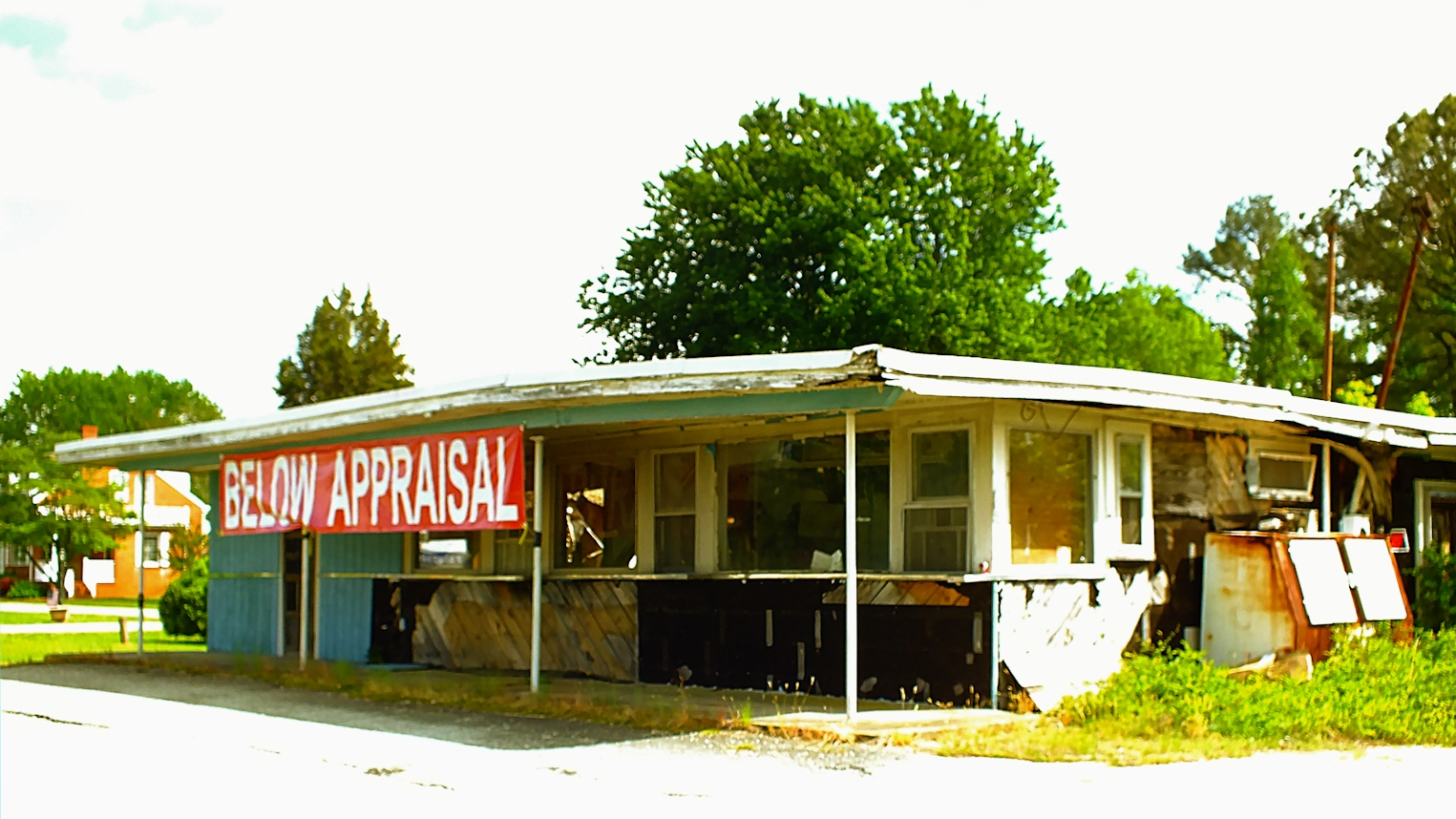

- Location within Virginia Location within the United States
- Coordinates: 37°26′19″N 76°34′33″W
- Country: United States
- State: Virginia
- County: Gloucester
- Elevation: 10 ft (3.0 m)
- Time zone: UTC-5 (Eastern (EST))
  - Summer (DST): UTC-4 (EDT)
- ZIP code: 23003
- Area code: 804
- GNIS feature ID: 1494815

Ark is an unincorporated community in Gloucester County, Virginia, United States. Ark is located on U.S. Route 17 and Virginia State Route 14, 3 miles (4.8 km) west-northwest of Gloucester Courthouse. Ark has a post office with ZIP code 23003.
