= Enders, Nebraska =

- Census-designated place
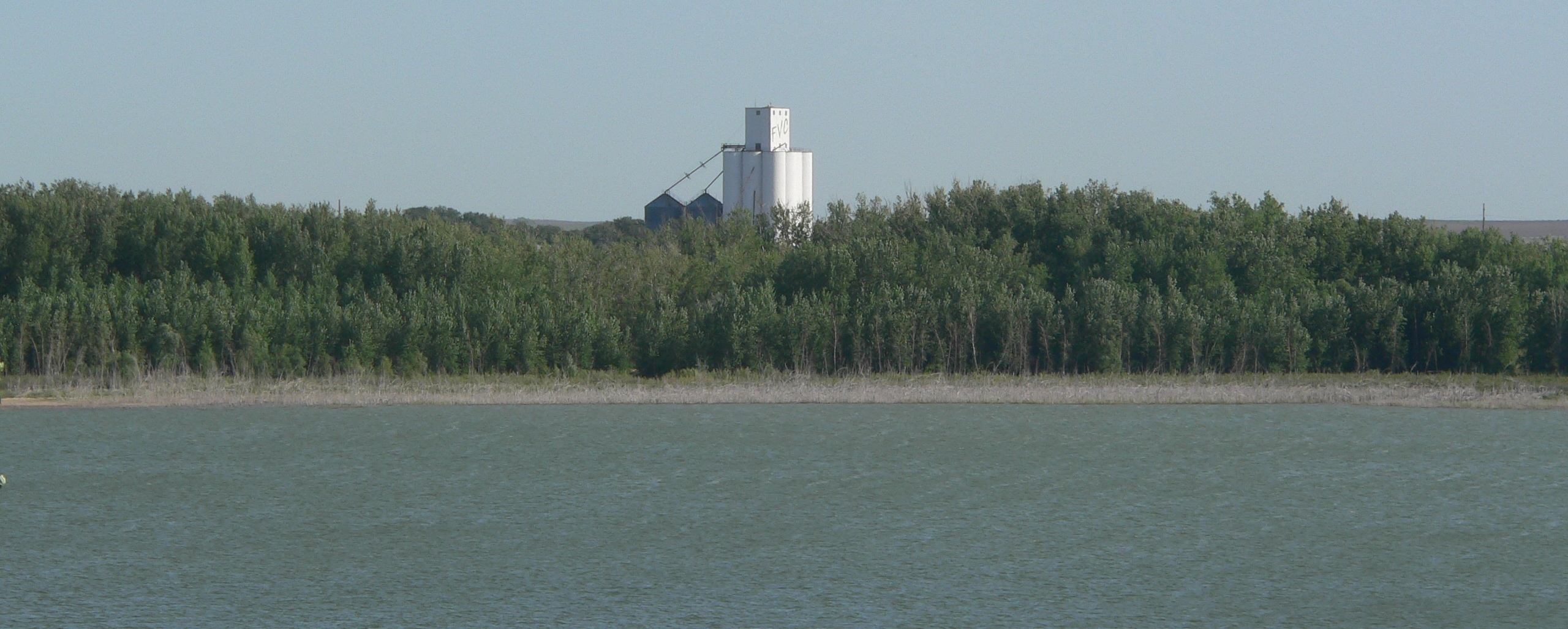
- Enders, seen from the south across Enders Reservoir

- Location within the state of Nebraska
- Coordinates: 40°27′18″N 101°32′08″W
- Country: United States
- State: Nebraska
- County: Chase

Area
  - Total: 0.13 sq mi (0.34 km^{2})
  - Land: 0.13 sq mi (0.34 km^{2})
  - Water: 0 sq mi (0.00 km^{2})
- Elevation: 3,146 ft (959 m)

Population (2020)
  - Total: 37
  - Density: 282.1/sq mi (108.93/km^{2})
- Time zone: UTC-7 (Mountain (MST))
  - Summer (DST): UTC-6 (MDT)
- ZIP codes: 69027
- FIPS code: 31-15885
- GNIS feature ID: 2583879

Enders is an unincorporated community and census-designated place in Chase County, Nebraska, United States. As of the 2020 census, Enders had a population of 37. Although Enders is unincorporated, it has a post office, with the ZIP code of 69027.

== History ==
Enders was established on the present site in 1890. The original location of Enders was 2 miles (3 km) to the east-southeast of the present site. The village was relocated to the railroad line which was to be built to Imperial. Enders Post Office was established Aug. 26, 1890, with William A. Reid as postmaster. After being closed in 1893, the post office was reestablished in 1907 with George W. Brown as postmaster. The village was named for Peter Enders, a local pioneer rancher.

Enders was one of the first communities in western Nebraska to be served with electrical power. An irrigation and power dam was located south of the village on Frenchman Creek. The dam and generator were operated by Ralph Grosbach. The location of the power dam was flooded when Enders Dam was finished in 1951.

== Geography ==
Enders lies along U.S. Route 6 and Nebraska Highway 61, 9 miles (14 km) southeast of the city of Imperial, the county seat of Chase County.

Enders is located on the north shore of Enders Reservoir. Enders Dam was built on Frenchman Creek in 1947-1951 as part of the Missouri Basin Program of the Bureau of Reclamation. Enders Reservoir State Recreation Area is a popular location for fishing, hunting and other outdoor recreation activities.

== Demographics ==
Historical population
Census	Pop.	Note	%±
2020	37		—
U.S. Decennial Census
