= Fieldton, Texas =

- Unincorporated community
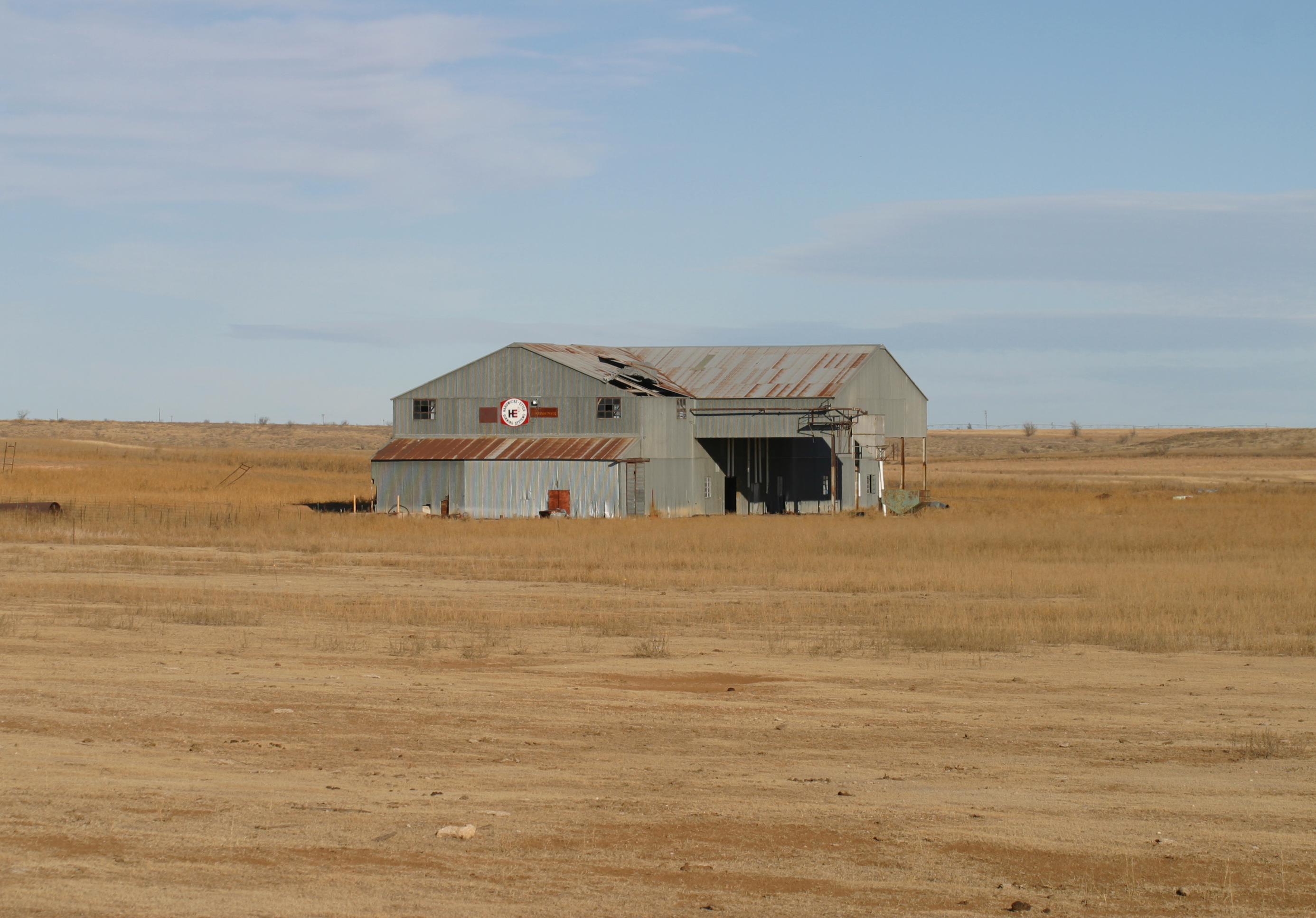
- Fieldton cotton gin, constructed in 1931, now abandoned.

- Location within Texas Location within the United States
- Coordinates: 34°02′21″N 102°13′24″W
- Country: United States
- State: Texas
- County: Lamb
- Region: Llano Estacado
- Established: 1924
- Elevation: 3,579 ft (1,091 m)

Population (2000)
  - Total: 126
- Time zone: UTC-6 (CST)
- ZIP code: 79326
- Area code: 806
- Website: Handbook of Texas

Fieldton is an unincorporated community in Lamb County, Texas, United States. Fieldton has a post office with the ZIP code 79326.

== Geography ==
Fieldton lies on the high plains of the Llano Estacado in eastern Lamb County at the intersection of Farm to Market roads 37 and 1072, just to the north of Blackwater Draw, a dry tributary of the Double Mountain Fork Brazos River. The community is located 10 mi (16 km) northeast of Littlefield, 11 mi (18 km) southwest of Olton, and 38 mi (61 km) northwest of Lubbock, Texas.

== See also ==
- Blackwater Draw
- Yellow House Canyon
- Llano Estacado
- West Texas
