= Arapahoe, Colorado =

Census-designated place in Cheyenne County, Colorado, United States

- Census-designated place
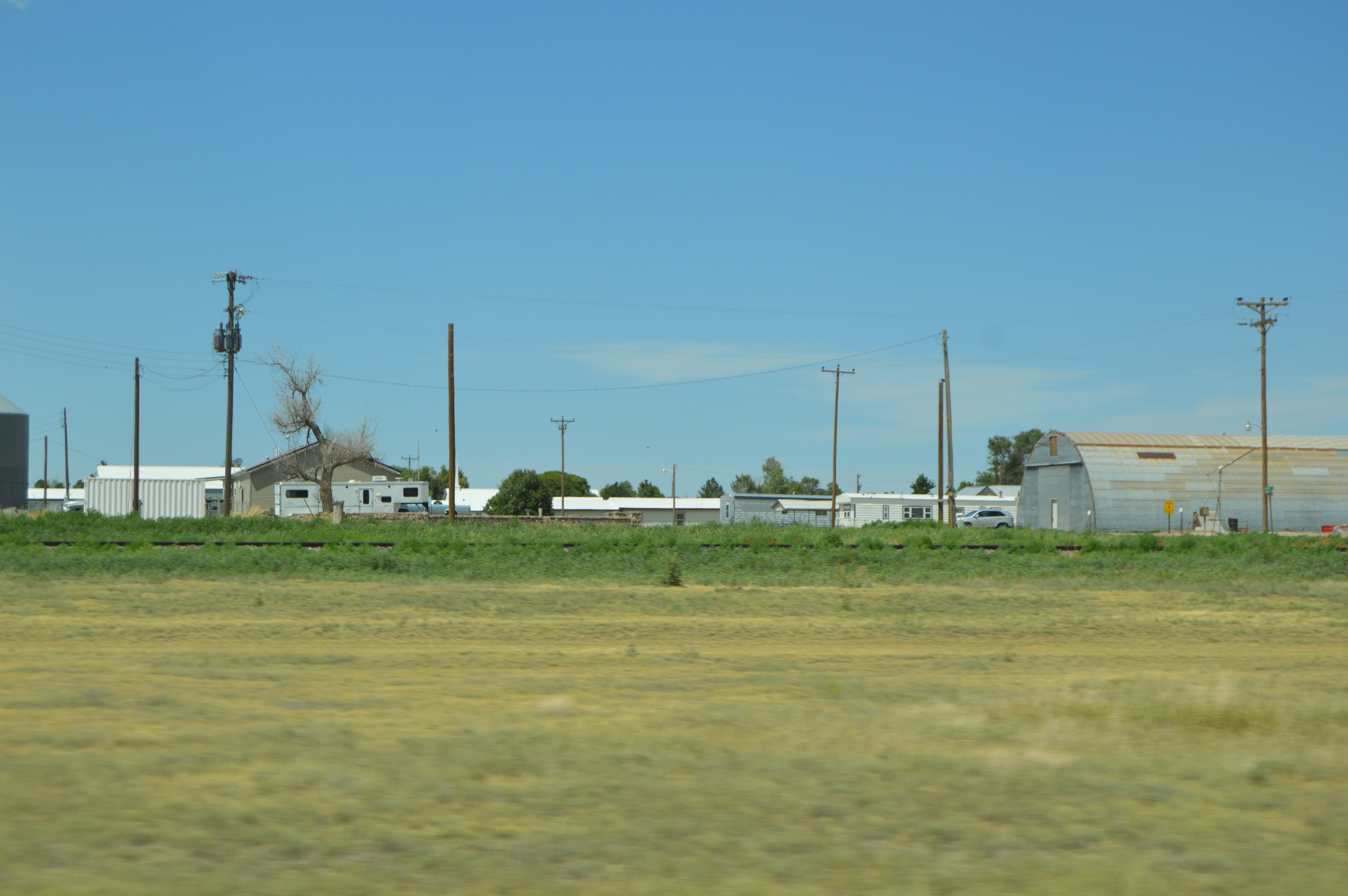
- View from U.S. Route 40 (2024)

- Location of Arapahoe, Colorado. Arapahoe (Colorado)
- Coordinates: 38°51′11″N 102°10′44″W
- Country: United States
- State: Colorado
- County: Cheyenne
- Founded: 1870

Government
  - Type: Unincorporated community
  - Body: Cheyenne County

Area
  - Total: 0.277 sq mi (0.718 km^{2})
  - Land: 0.277 sq mi (0.718 km^{2})
  - Water: 0 sq mi (0.000 km^{2})
- Elevation: 4,006 ft (1,221 m)

Population (2020)
  - Total: 102
  - Density: 368/sq mi (142/km^{2})
- Time zone: UTC−07:00 (MST)
  - Summer (DST): UTC−06:00 (MDT)
- ZIP Code: 80802
- Area code: 719
- GNIS CDP ID: 2804445
- FIPS code: 08-02850

Arapahoe is an unincorporated community and census-designated place (CDP) in Cheyenne County, Colorado, United States. The population was 102 at the 2020 census.

== History ==
Arapahoe was established in 1870. The Arapahoe, Colorado, post office opened on May 5, 1906. The Arapahoe post office has the ZIP code 80802. The town name honors the Arapaho Native American people who lived in the area.

== Geography ==
At the 2020 United States Census, the CDP has an area of 177 acres (0.718 km^{2}), all land.

== Demographics ==
Arapahoe, Colorado
Year	Pop.	±%
2020	102	—
Source: United States Census Bureau

The United States Census Bureau defined the Arapahoe CDP for the United States Census 2020.

== See also ==
- List of census-designated places in Colorado
