= Sitka, Kansas =

Unincorporated community in Clark County, Kansas

- Unincorporated community
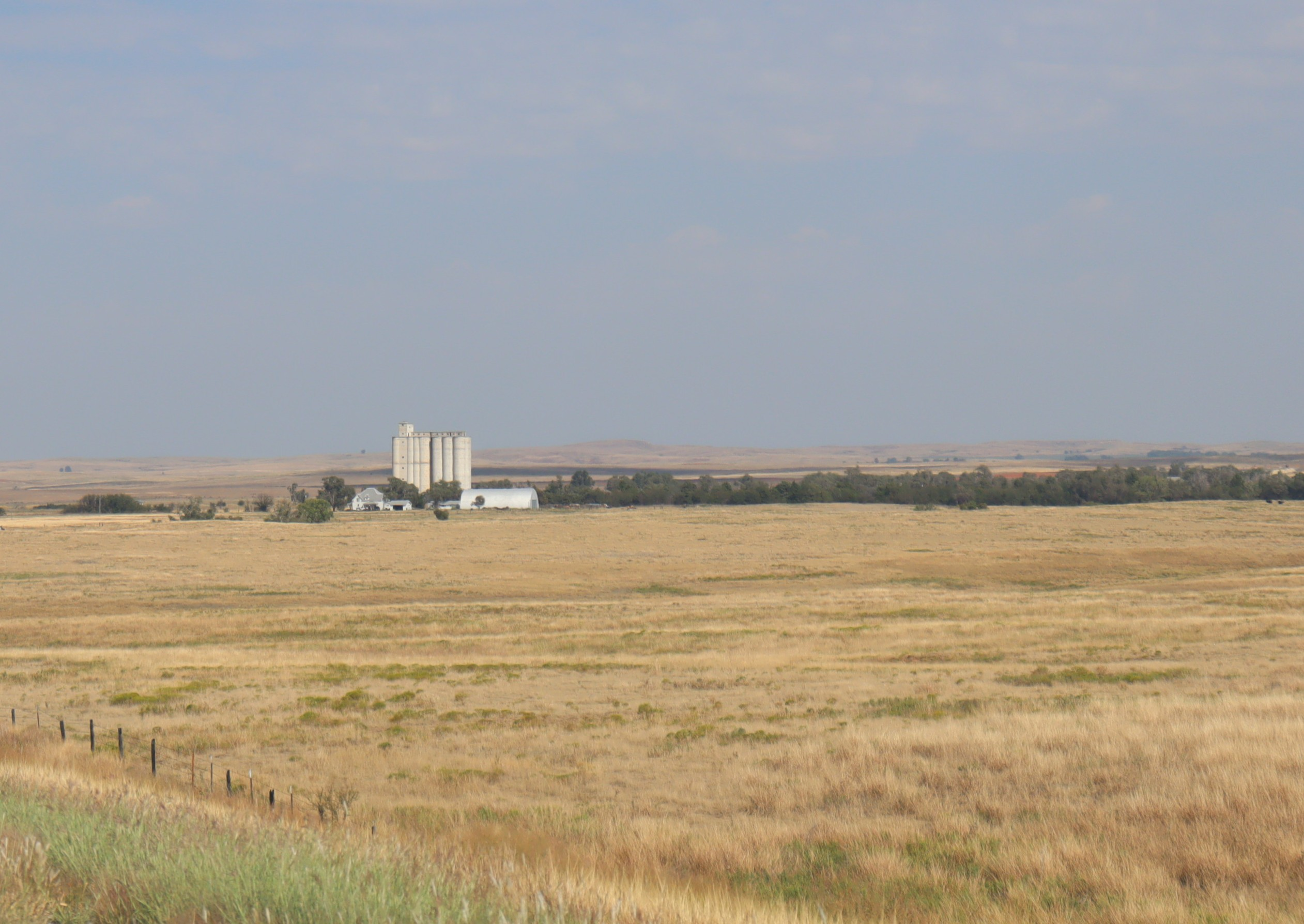
- Skyline view of Sitka (2024)

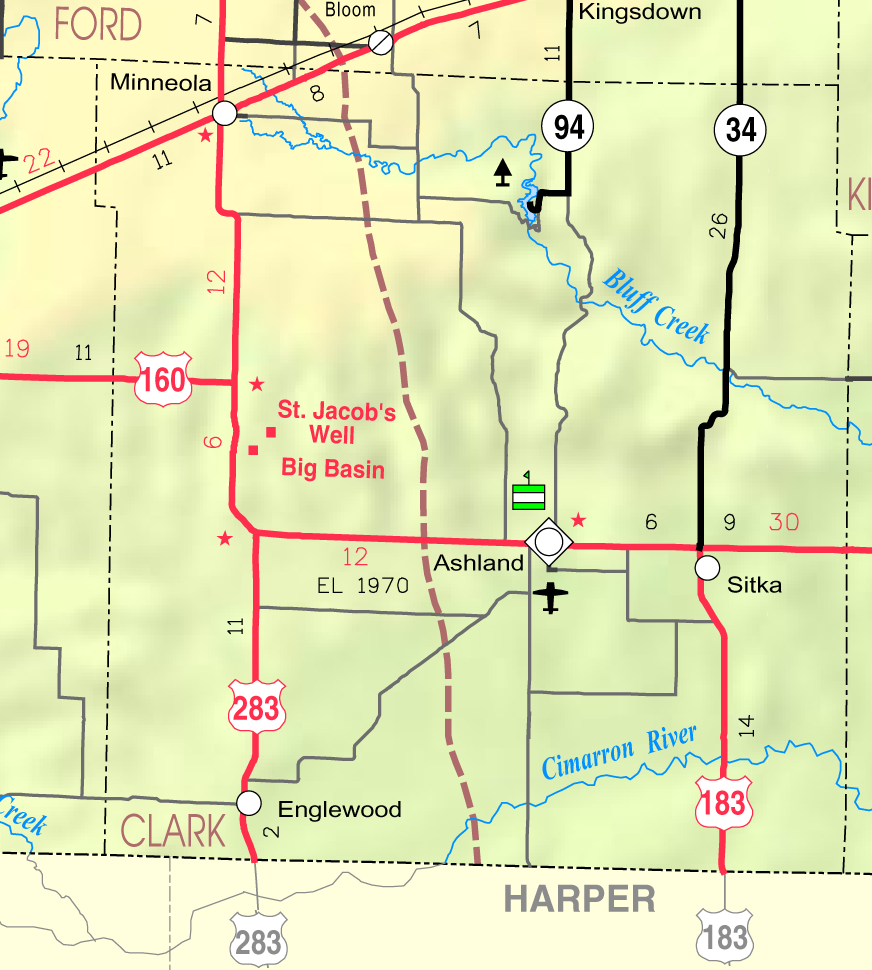
- KDOT map of ClarkMarion County (legend)

- Location within Kansas Location within the United States
- Coordinates: 37°10′30″N 99°39′5″W
- Country: United States
- State: Kansas
- County: Clark
- Founded: 1909
- Elevation: 1,890 ft (580 m)
- Time zone: UTC-6 (CST)
  - Summer (DST): UTC-5 (CDT)
- Area code: 620
- FIPS code: 20-65700
- GNIS ID: 484538

Sitka is an unincorporated community in Clark County, Kansas, United States.

== History ==
Sitka was founded in 1909.

Its post office was closed on May 22, 1964. The Atchison, Topeka and Santa Fe depot, built in 1930, has been moved to Dodge City and is now part of the Boot Hill Museum.

The town today consists of only three occupied houses, a grain elevator, a few vacant buildings, and numerous ruins. Most of the town is on private property.

== Education ==
The community is served by Ashland USD 220 public school district.

== Transportation ==
The Atchison, Topeka and Santa Fe Railway formerly provided passenger rail service to Sitka on a line between Wichita and Englewood. Dedicated passenger service was provided until at least 1958, while mixed trains continued until at least 1961. As of 2025, the nearest passenger rail station is located in Dodge City, where Amtrak's Southwest Chief stops once daily on a route from Chicago to Los Angeles.
