= Boyero, Colorado =

Unincorporated community in Lincoln County, Colorado, United States

- unincorporated community
- Location of Boyero, Colorado. Boyero (Colorado)
- Coordinates: 38°56′34″N 103°16′45″W
- Country: United States
- State: Colorado
- County: Lincoln

Government
  - Type: Unincorporated community
  - Body: Lincoln County
- Elevation: 4,721 ft (1,439 m)
- Time zone: UTC−07:00 (MST)
  - Summer (DST): UTC−06:00 (MDT)
- ZIP Code: 80821 (Hugo)
- Area code: 719
- GNIS pop ID: 195163

Boyero is an unincorporated community in Lincoln County, Colorado, United States.

== History ==
The Boyero, Colorado, post office operated from March 3, 1902, until July 20, 1973, when it was converted to a contract post office of the Hugo, Colorado, post office (Zip code 80821).

The community was named for the local cattle industry. "Boyero" means "drover" in the Spanish language.

== See also ==
- List of populated places in Colorado
- List of post offices in Colorado
