= KDDD =

KDDD may refer to:

- KDDD-FM, a radio station (95.3 FM) licensed to Dumas, Texas, United States
- KDDD (AM), a radio station (800 AM) licensed to Dumas, Texas, United States
