= McKee refinery fire =

1956 oil tank explosion in Texas

Coordinates: 35°57′21.28″N 101°53′11.49″W

The McKee refinery tank explosion and fire on Sunday, July 29, 1956, was an explosion and severe fire-related mass casualty event, killing 19 firefighters. The fire is considered to have the fourth-most (the September 11 attacks being first) casualties of fire fighters in the United States for a single fire event. Their names are engraved at the firefighters' memorial on the grounds of the Texas State Capitol. Another memorial is on the grounds of the Moore County courthouse.

The refinery, located south of the Texas/Oklahoma border and seven miles south of Sunray, Texas, included a spherical tank containing 500,000 gallons of pentane and hexane. Vapors escaped from the tank and migrated downhill toward other installations. The vapors ignited, probably near an asphalt plant and travelled back toward the tank. There, the flames consumed the escaping vapors, forcing firefighters to use water to cool nearby tanks to prevent further spread.

The volunteer fire crews from nearby Sunray and Dumas were fighting the fire in a conventional manner, while the decision was made to reduce the amount of liquid in the burning tank. This increased the volume of the tank filled with explosive vapors. A few minutes before 7:00 am, an hour after the blaze began, the tank ruptured as the remaining fluid in the tank boiled, increasing the gas pressure past the tank's bursting point.

Sixteen firefighters died at the scene; three more perished later, succumbing to burns. An additional 32 people, firefighters and sight-seers, were injured. The blast ignited three additional storage tanks. The fire overwhelmed the resources available and was allowed to burn itself out overnight.
