= KDUX =

KDUX may refer to:

- KDUX-FM, a radio station (104.7 FM) licensed to Aberdeen, Washington, United States
- Moore County Airport (Texas) (ICAO code KDUX) in Moore County, Texas
