= Dumas Independent School District =

School district in Texas

Dumas Independent School District is a public school district based in Dumas, Texas (USA).

In addition to Dumas, the district serves the city of Cactus and most of rural Moore County.

In 2009, the school district was rated "academically acceptable" by the Texas Education Agency.

== Schools ==
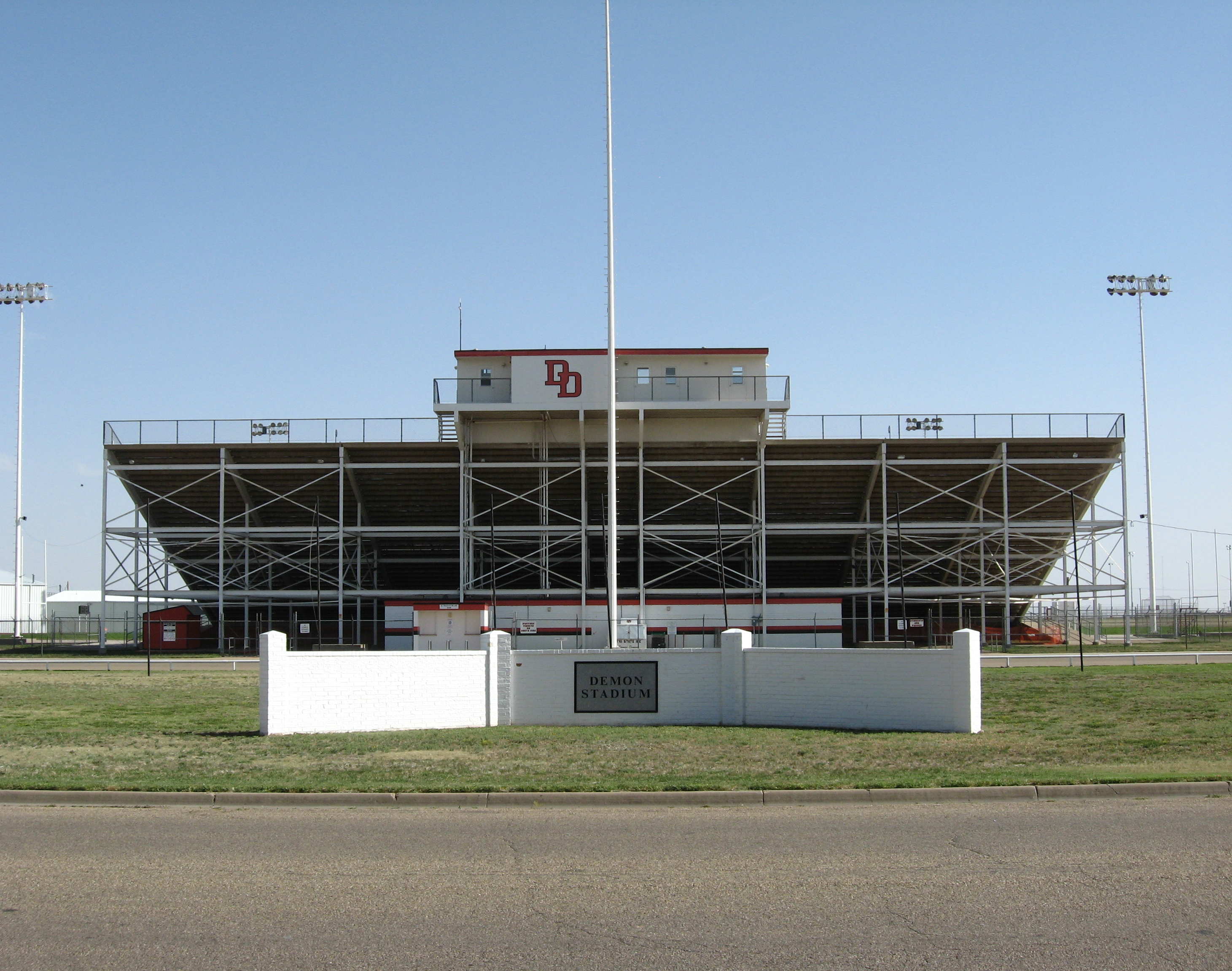
Demon Stadium in Dumas

=== Secondary schools ===
- Dumas High School (Dumas, Grades 9-12)
- Dumas Junior High School (Dumas, Grades 7-8)
  - 1999-2000 National Blue Ribbon School
- Dumas Intermediate School (Dumas, Grades 5-6)

=== Primary schools ===
- Dumas Intermediate School (Dumas)
- Green Acres Elementary School (Dumas)
- Hillcrest Elementary School (Dumas)
- Morningside Elementary School (Dumas)
- Sunset Elementary School (Dumas)
- Cactus Elementary School (Cactus)

=== Alternative Schools ===
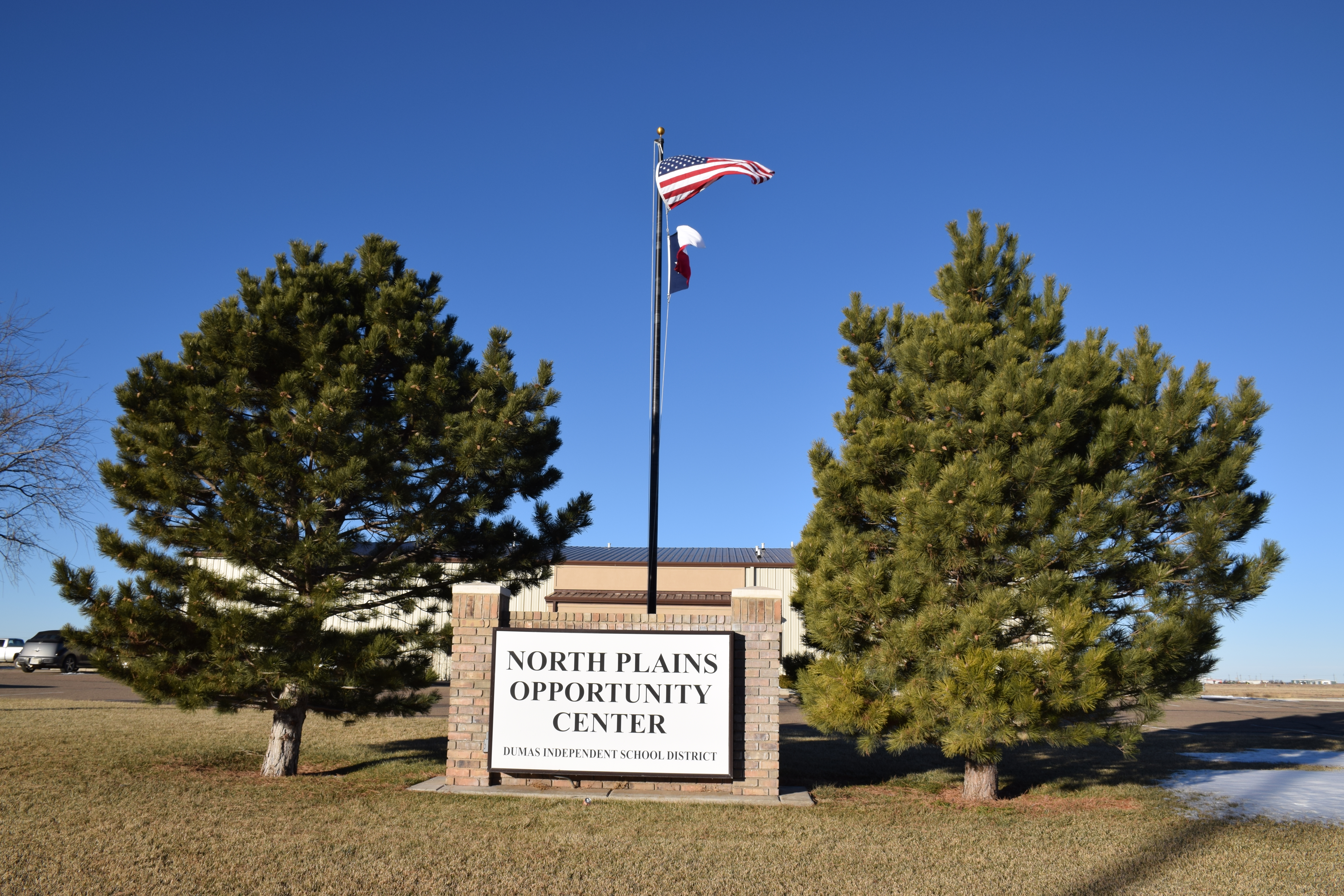
Front of building

The North Plains Opportunity Center (Op-Center) is an alternative school located within the Dumas Independent School District. The primary function of the school is to provide an alternative education for the student who is at risk of dropping out of school, needing to recover lost credits or who desires to accelerate their education experience in order to pursue college or career goals.
