= KDDD (AM) =

- Dumas, Texas; United States
- Broadcast area: Amarillo area
- Frequency: 800 kHz

Programming
- Format: Oldies
- Affiliations: The True Oldies Channel

Ownership
- Owner: Grant Merrill; (Southwest Media Group - Dumas, LLC)
- Sister stations: KDDD-FM

History
- First air date: 1948
- Call sign meaning: "I’m a Ding Dong Daddy From Dumas", a song written by Phil Baxter in the 1920s

Technical information
- Licensing authority: FCC
- Facility ID: 74312
- Class: D
- Power: 250 watts (day); 8 watts (night)
- Transmitter coordinates: 35°51′42.1″N 101°55′51.6″W
- Translator: 103.5 K278DB (Borger)

Links
- Public license information: Public file; LMS

KDDD (800 AM) is a radio station broadcasting an oldies music format. Licensed to Dumas, Texas, United States, the station serves the Amarillo, Texas, area. The station is currently owned by Grant Merrill, through Southwest Media Group - Dumas, LLC, and features programming from The True Oldies Channel.

Previous owner PBI, LLC and Paramount Broadcasting Corporation signed a five-year local marketing agreement that allowed the "All Ag, All Day" programming to be broadcast across the entire Texas and Oklahoma panhandles. Coverage also included southwestern Kansas, southeastern Colorado and northeastern New Mexico.

== History ==
Until 2019, KDDD and KDDD-FM, known as K Triple D, had their most successful years under the ownership of Ken Duke. Duke used and trademarked the popular Ding Dong Daddy from Dumas mascot, that is still used today as part of the stations' logo. The trademark was lent to the Dumas Moore County Chamber of Commerce for marketing purposes for the town.

Also during this time, rock 'n roll history was made in 1957, when a local group known as the Rhythm Orchids, featuring Dumas residents Jimmy Bowen, and Don Lanier, both performers on K Triple D AM, teamed up with singer Buddy Knox of Happy, Texas in college. At the famed Norman Petty Studios in Clovis, New Mexico they recorded the songs "Party Doll" and I'm Sticking With You", and started the small label Triple D Records, named after the radio station.

Roulette Records in New York City bought out the Triple D Records label, and released both songs, with the Buddy Knox and the Orchids name on Party Doll. The song went to #1 on the national charts, while Jimmy Bowen singing lead on I'm Sticking With You, going to #14. The boys were instant stars.

Also during this time, Buddy Holly, friends of Knox and the Orchids, performed in concert in downtown Dumas in front of the Evelyn Theater (which still exists) on June 21, 1957. "That'll Be the Day" was climbing the charts at this time, and went to #1 in October, launching his iconic career.

KDDD during these years was mostly country, while KDDD-FM was beautiful music and then mellow rock, known as Mellow Rock 95.3, with the call sign KMRE.

After struggling for years under different owners, the stations were saved by local resident, and sports play by play man, Darrell Wait. With the help of partners, including Moore County resident and farmer Darren Stallwitz, the stations were saved and made solid again. During this time period, many local Dumas Demon and Demonette sports have been aired. For their eleven years of ownership, KDDD-FM was oldies.

In 2018, they wanted to sell the stations, and found a buyer in broadcast veteran Chris Lash of Tennessee. Lash changed the FM station from its long time oldies format to classic country, known now as Big Country 95.3 K Triple D.

Plans are now in the works for KDDD, which has been an all agriculture format, leased by a group in Floyada, Texas for the past five years. KDDD went all Christmas music on Black Friday, 2019, and was to feature a new format on December 26, 2019. KDDD, known in the past as the "Voice of the High Plains", has one of the larger daytime AM signals on the Panhandle of Texas.

Planned also in 2020 was a revival of the Buddy Holly concert in 1957, at the town's annual Dogie Days celebration.

Both stations stream from the website www.bigcountry953.com.

On November 29, 2019, the station dropped their agricultural news format and began playing Christmas music. It announced via its social media that it would introduce a new, permanent format on December 26. The station subsequently introduced an oldies format using The True Oldies Channel programming.

Effective June 24, 2022, owners Highway 64 Radio, LLC sold KDDD and KDDD-FM to Grant Merrill's Southwest Media Group - Dumas, LLC for $300,000.
