= Sunray High School (Texas) =

Location
- 900 Avenue Q Sunray, Texas 79086-0240; United States; 36.013418°N 101.820858°W

Information
- School type: Public High School
- School district: Sunray Independent School District
- Principal: Mandy Traylor
- Staff: 18.15 (FTE)
- Grades: 9-12
- Enrollment: 188 (2023–2024)
- Student to teacher ratio: 10.36
- Colors: Blue & Gold
- Athletics conference: UIL Class AA
- Mascot: Bobcat/Lady Bobcat
- Yearbook: The Bobcat
- Website: Sunray High School

Sunray High School is a public high school located in Sunray, Texas, United States, and classified as a 2A school by the UIL. It is part of the Sunray Independent School District located in northeast Moore County. In 2015, the school was rated "Met Standard" by the Texas Education Agency.

== Athletics ==
The Sunray Bobcats compete in these sports -

- Basketball
- Cross Country
- Football
- Golf
- Powerlifting
- Tennis
- Track and Field
- Baseball
- Softball

=== State Titles ===
- Girls Track -
  - 1979(1A)
  - 2019(2A)

==== State Finalists ====
- Boys Basketball -
  - 1960(1A)
