= Moore County Airport =

Moore County Airport may refer to:

- Moore County Airport (North Carolina) in Moore County, North Carolina, United States (FAA/IATA: SOP)
- Moore County Airport (Texas) in Moore County, Texas, United States (FAA/IATA: DUX)
