= Cactus, Texas =

- City
- City of Cactus
- Interactive map of Cactus, Texas
- Coordinates: 36°02′46″N 102°00′08″W
- Country: United States
- State: Texas
- County: Moore

Government
  - Type: Commission-Manager
  - Mayor: Socorro Marquez

Area
  - Total: 2.13 sq mi (5.52 km^{2})
  - Land: 2.13 sq mi (5.52 km^{2})
  - Water: 0 sq mi (0.00 km^{2})
- Elevation: 3,619 ft (1,103 m)

Population (2020)
  - Total: 3,057
  - Density: 1,430/sq mi (554/km^{2})
- Time zone: UTC-6 (Central (CST))
  - Summer (DST): UTC-5 (CDT)
- ZIP code: 79013
- Area code: 806
- FIPS code: 48-11692
- GNIS feature ID: 2409953
- Website: https://cityofcactus.org/

Cactus is a city in Moore County, Texas, United States, located along U.S. Route 287. The population was 3,057 at the 2020 census.

"Cactus Texas", a song by Waylon Jennings, is a sketch of Cactus from years past.

== Geography ==
According to the United States Census Bureau, the city has a total area of 2.0 square miles (5.2 km^{2}), all land. Cactus is located 54 miles (87 km) north of Amarillo and 13 miles (21 km) north of Dumas.

=== Climate ===
According to the Köppen climate classification system, Cactus has a semiarid climate, BSk on climate maps.

== Economy ==
JBS USA has a beef plant in Cactus. Its work force comes largely from an immigrant population.

== Demographics ==
Historical population
Census	Pop.	Note	%±
1970	644		—
1980	898		39.4%
1990	1,529		70.3%
2000	2,538		66.0%
2010	3,179		25.3%
2020	3,057		−3.8%
U.S. Decennial Census

=== 2020 Census ===
As of the 2020 census, there were 3,057 people, 921 households, and 668 families residing in the city.

There were 1,046 housing units, of which 12.0% were vacant. Among occupied housing units, 38.2% were owner-occupied and 61.8% were renter-occupied. The homeowner vacancy rate was 0.8% and the rental vacancy rate was 13.1%.

The median age was 28.8 years. 32.3% of residents were under the age of 18 and 5.4% of residents were 65 years of age or older. For every 100 females there were 132.6 males, and for every 100 females age 18 and over there were 149.4 males age 18 and over.

0% of residents lived in urban areas, while 100.0% lived in rural areas.

Racial composition as of the 2020 census
Race	Percent
White	13.8%
Black or African American	12.4%
American Indian and Alaska Native	2.6%
Asian	11.1%
Native Hawaiian and Other Pacific Islander	0.1%
Some other race	38.4%
Two or more races	21.6%
Hispanic or Latino (of any race)	72.0%

Cactus racial composition (NH = Non-Hispanic) (Note: Note: the US Census treats Hispanic/Latino as an ethnic category. This table excludes Latinos from the racial categories and assigns them to a separate category. Hispanics/Latinos can be of any race.)
Race	Number	Percentage
White (NH)	130	4.25%
Black or African American (NH)	362	11.84%
Native American or Alaska Native (NH)	3	0.1%
Asian (NH)	328	10.73%
Some Other Race (NH)	15	0.49%
Mixed/Multi-Racial (NH)	17	0.56%
Hispanic or Latino	2,202	72.03%
Total	3,057	

=== 2010 Census ===
As of the census of 2010, 3,179 people, 801 households, and 650 families resided in the city. The population density was 1,558.1 inhabitants per square mile (601.6/km^{2}). The 908 housing units averaged 445.0 per square mile (171.9/km^{2}). The racial makeup of the city was 48.22% White, 1.01% African American, 2.8% Native American, 19.35% Asian, 24.41% from other races, and 3.84% from two or more races. Hispanics or Latinos of any race were 74.08% of the population. 67.9% of the city identified themselves as being of Mexican origin and 16.4% identified themselves as being of Burmese origin.

Of the 801 households, 54.7% had children under the age of 18 living with them, 57.8% were married couples living together, 12.4% had a female householder with no husband present, and 18.9% were not families. About 9.7% of all households were made up of individuals, and 1.5% had someone living alone who was 65 years of age or older. The average household size was 3.97 and the average family size was 4.26.

In the city, the population was distributed as 37.34% under the age of 18, 12.8% from 18 to 24, 30% from 25 to 44, 16.6% from 45 to 64, and 3.4% who were 65 years of age or older. The median age was 25 years. For every 100 females, there were 127.2 males. For every 100 females age 18 and over, there were 131.4 males.

=== 2000 Census ===
As of the census of 2000, 2,538 people, 660 households, and 570 families resided in the city. The population density was 1,243.9 inhabitants per square mile (480.3/km^{2}). The 820 housing units averaged 401.9 per square mile (155.2/km^{2}). The racial makeup of the city was 24.43% White, 0.55% African American, 0.87% Native American, 0.28% Asian, 71.24% from other races, and 2.64% from two or more races. Hispanics or Latinos of any race were 96.10% of the population.

Of the 660 households, 67.1% had children under the age of 18 living with them, 68.0% were married couples living together, 11.8% had a female householder with no husband present, and 13.5% were not families. About 8.3% of all households were made up of individuals, and 1.7% had someone living alone who was 65 years of age or older. The average household size was 3.85 and the average family size was 4.10.

In the city, the population was distributed as 42.7% under the age of 18, 13.9% from 18 to 24, 30.7% from 25 to 44, 10.3% from 45 to 64, and 2.4% who were 65 years of age or older. The median age was 22 years. For every 100 females, there were 118.8 males. For every 100 females age 18 and over, there were 115.7 males.

The median income for a household in the city was $25,611, and for a family was $26,250. Males had a median income of $21,384 versus $18,110 for females. The per capita income for the city was $8,340. About 21.4% of families and 22.3% of the population were below the poverty line, including 25.3% of those under age 18 and 15.4% of those age 65 or over.

== Government ==
The City of Cactus government is a commission-manager government with a mayor and five commissioners all elected from the city at-large, and a city manager appointed by the commission to serve as the administrative manager of the city.

== Education ==
The City of Cactus is served by the Dumas Independent School District.

- Cactus Elementary School
- Dumas Intermediate School
- Dumas Junior High School
- Dumas High School

== Tornado ==
On April 21, 2007, Cactus was hit by an EF2 tornado. In all, 16 tornadoes were reported across the Texas Panhandle on that Saturday evening, including one in Tulia that damaged several businesses and injured three people, but Cactus suffered comparably greater damage. City and Moore County officials, including Cactus City Manager Jeff Jenkins, estimated about one-third of Cactus either was damaged or destroyed. The tornado injured 14 people, said Trooper Wayne Beighle of the Texas Department of Public Safety. "I am shocked no one was killed," said Charles Morehead, a special projects manager for West Texas Gas. Morehead said the devastation in Cactus was akin to that which he saw in Higgins as a child. A tornado swept through the town, killing about 50 people on April 9, 1947. It remains the most destructive tornado in Texas Panhandle history. The tornado was a mile wide when it struck the city of Cactus. Buildings were flattened, power was knocked out to thousands, and debris was scattered for miles after the tornado.

== See also ==
- Impact of the COVID-19 pandemic on the meat industry in the United States

== External links and further reading ==
- "U.S. Raids 6 Meat Plants in ID Case", article The New York Times by Julia Preston, December 13, 2006
