= KDDD-FM =

- Dumas, Texas; United States
- Broadcast area: Moore County
- Frequency: 95.3 MHz
- Branding: Big Country 95.3

Programming
- Format: Classic country
- Affiliations: ABC Radio

Ownership
- Owner: Grant Merrill; (Southwest Media Group - Dumas, LLC)
- Sister stations: KDDD

History
- First air date: 1948
- Call sign meaning: "I’m a Ding Dong Daddy From Dumas," a song written by Phil Baxter in the 1920s

Technical information
- Licensing authority: FCC
- Facility ID: 74311
- Class: C3
- ERP: 6,600 watts
- HAAT: 79 meters
- Transmitter coordinates: 35°51′51″N 101°55′44″W

Links
- Public license information: Public file; LMS
- Website: bigcountry953.com

KDDD-FM (95.3 FM) is a radio station broadcasting a classic country format. Licensed to Dumas, Texas, United States, the station serves the Dumas area. The station is currently owned by Grant Merrill and Ben Buckland, through licensee Southwest Media Group - Dumas, LLC, and features programming from ABC Radio.

In June 2006, KDDD-FM made a major update to its website. The new site includes local news stories and sports stories for the northern Texas Panhandle.

== KDDD and KDDD-FM ownership ==
1956-1988 Ken Duke 1988-1990 George Chapman, Jay Speegle, A.C. "Bub" Smith, Richard Khouri 1990-2000 Phil Haaland 2000-2004 Joel Williamson 2004-2006 Eddie Tubbs and Darrell Wait 2006-2019 Darrell Wait and Darren Stallwitz 2019-2022 Carienne Carstater 2022- Grant Merrill, Ben Buckland

== 1956 to 1988 ==
Until 2019, KDDD and KDDD-FM, known as K Triple D, had their most successful years under the ownership of Ken Duke. Duke used and trademarked the popular Ding Dong Daddy from Dumas mascot, that is still used today as part of the station's logo. The trademark was lent to the Dumas Moore County Chamber of Commerce for marketing purposes for the town.

Also during this time, rock 'n roll history was made in 1957, when a local group known as the Rhythm Orchids, featuring Dumas residents Jimmy Bowen, and Don Lanier, both performers on K Triple D AM, teamed up with singer Buddy Knox of Happy, TX in college. At the famed Norman Petty Studios in Clovis, NM, they recorded the songs "Party Doll" and I'm Sticking With You", and started the small label Triple D Records, named after the radio station.

Roulette Records in New York bought out the Triple D Records label, and released both songs, with the Buddy Knox and the Orchids name on Party Doll. The song went to #1 on the national charts, while Jimmy Bowen singing lead on I'm Sticking With You, going to #14. The boys were instant stars.

Also during this time, Buddy Holly, friends of Knox and the Orchids, performed in concert in downtown Dumas in front of the Evelyn Theater (which still exists) on June 21, 1957. "That'll Be The Day" was climbing the charts at this time, and went to #1 in October, launching his iconic career.

KDDD during these years was mostly country, while KDDD-FM was beautiful music and then mellow rock, known as Mellow Rock 95.3, with the call sign KMRE.

== 2004-2022 ==
After struggling for years under different owners, the stations were saved by local resident and sports play-by-play man Darrell Wait. With the help of partners, including Moore County resident and farmer Darren Stallwitz, the stations were saved and made solid again. During this time period, many Dumas Demon and Demonette athletic events have been aired. For their eleven years of ownership, KDDD-FM was oldies.

In 2018, they wanted to sell the stations, and found a buyer in a company managed by broadcast veteran Chris Lash of Tennessee. Lash changed the FM station from its long time oldies format to classic country, known now as Big Country 95.3 K Triple D.

Plans are now in the works for KDDD, which has been an all ag format, leased by a group in Floyada, TX for the past five years. KDDD went all Christmas music on Black Friday 2019, and was to feature a new format on December 26, 2019. KDDD, known in the past as the "Voice of the High Plains", has one of the larger daytime AM signals on the Panhandle of Texas.

Both stations stream from the website www.bigcountry953.com

Lash died unexpectedly in November 2021. On March 4, 2022, an application was filed with the FCC to sell the company to Southwest Media Group, owned by broadcasters Grant Merrill and Ben Buckland. The deal for both stations, at a price of $300,000, was consummated on June 24, 2022.
