= Sunray, Texas =

- City
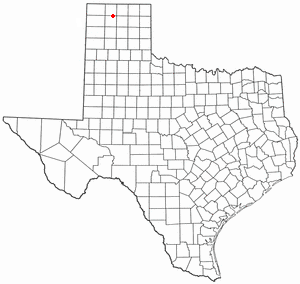
- Location of Sunray, Texas

- Coordinates: 36°01′06″N 101°49′28″W
- Country: United States
- State: Texas
- County: Moore

Area
  - Total: 1.71 sq mi (4.42 km^{2})
  - Land: 1.71 sq mi (4.42 km^{2})
  - Water: 0 sq mi (0.00 km^{2})
- Elevation: 3,504 ft (1,068 m)

Population (2020)
  - Total: 1,707
  - Density: 1,000/sq mi (386/km^{2})
- Time zone: UTC-6 (Central (CST))
  - Summer (DST): UTC-5 (CDT)
- ZIP code: 79086
- Area code: 806
- FIPS code: 48-71180
- GNIS feature ID: 2412010
- Website: http://cityhall.cityofsunray.com/

Sunray is a city in northeastern Moore County, Texas, United States. Its population was 1,707 at the 2020 census.

== History ==
Sunray, Texas, was founded by Jack Clarence Collins. He was born in Hartley, Texas, in 1893, and in 1902 moved to Channing with his parents, Mr. and Mrs. E.S. Collins. Jack graduated from Channing High School and later, in 1916, from Texas A&M, where he was class valedictorian and class president in his senior year. Later, he served for several years as cashier of the First National Bank of Channing while extending his family's ranch holdings. Mr. Collins was well-known and respected in ranching and financial circles and was a ranking member of the Republican Party for several years.

Jack Collins did not call the town "Sunray" when he laid it out in 1930. The first lots were sold at $10 each under the name "Altman", but a town in Rusk County had already appropriated that name, hence, the name "Sunray" was used. A post office was applied for on May 5, 1930, using the name "Altman", but because of the duplication, "Sunray" was not approved until 1935.

The change to the name "Sunray" came because Sunray Oil Company (later Sunoco) set up a gas-oil refinery near the town on 10 acres (40,000 m^{2}) of land originally donated by Mr. Collins to Dana Oil and Gas Royalty Company. Sunray Oil Company bought Dana's holdings in the early Jones Field in northeastern Moore County, which was near the new town. The townsite location was determined by a new Rock Island Railroad route running from Dalhart to Morse along the northern edge of Mr. Collins's townsite survey. At the time, the town was 3 miles (4.8 km) from the Jones Well and 6 miles (9.7 km) from the Morton oil well—both early oil-gas discoveries in Moore County.

On Sunday, July 29, 1956, the nearby industrial plant was the site of a major accident. The McKee refinery fire killed 19 firefighters when a storage tank suffered a vapor explosion.

== Geography ==
According to the United States Census Bureau, the city has a total area of 1.7 square miles (4.4 km^{2}), all land.

=== Climate ===
According to the Köppen climate classification, Sunray has a semiarid climate, BSk on climate maps.

== Demographics ==
Historical population
Census	Pop.	Note	%±
1950	1,530		—
1960	1,967		28.6%
1970	1,854		−5.7%
1980	1,952		5.3%
1990	1,729		−11.4%
2000	1,950		12.8%
2010	1,926		−1.2%
2020	1,707		−11.4%
U.S. Decennial Census

=== 2020 census ===
As of the 2020 census, Sunray had a population of 1,707 and 577 families. The median age was 36.7 years. 29.7% of residents were under the age of 18 and 13.1% of residents were 65 years of age or older. For every 100 females there were 106.9 males, and for every 100 females age 18 and over there were 106.9 males age 18 and over.

0.0% of residents lived in urban areas, while 100.0% lived in rural areas.

There were 628 households in Sunray, of which 39.2% had children under the age of 18 living in them. Of all households, 56.8% were married-couple households, 20.2% were households with a male householder and no spouse or partner present, and 18.5% were households with a female householder and no spouse or partner present. About 22.1% of all households were made up of individuals and 9.5% had someone living alone who was 65 years of age or older.

There were 716 housing units, of which 12.3% were vacant. The homeowner vacancy rate was 2.3% and the rental vacancy rate was 16.2%.

Racial composition as of the 2020 census
Race	Number	Percent
White	1,036	60.7%
Black or African American	5	0.3%
American Indian and Alaska Native	32	1.9%
Asian	3	0.2%
Native Hawaiian and Other Pacific Islander	0	0.0%
Some other race	341	20.0%
Two or more races	290	17.0%
Hispanic or Latino (of any race)	814	47.7%

=== 2000 census ===
As of the census of 2000, 1,950 people, 688 households, and 531 families resided in the city. The population density was 1,154.0 inhabitants per square mile (445.6/km^{2}). The 772 housing units averaged 456.9/sq mi (176.4/km^{2}). The racial makeup of the city was 72.92% White, 0.72% African American, 0.77% Native American, 0.15% Asian, 23.38% from other races, and 2.05% from two or more races. Hispanics or Latinos of any race were 35.59% of the population.

Of the 688 households, 45.1% had children under t18 living with them, 64.7% were married couples living together, 8.7% had a female householder with no husband present, and 22.8% were not families. About 20.5% of all households were made up of individuals, and 10.0% had someone living alone who was 65 or older. The average household size was 2.83 and the average family size was 3.31.

In the city, the population was distributed as 33.8% under 18, 7.3% from 18 to 24, 29.4% from 25 to 44, 19.7% from 45 to 64, and 9.8% who were 65 or older. The median age was 32 years. For every 100 females, there were 99.4 males. For every 100 females 18 and over, there were 93.8 males.

The median income for a household in the city was $32,026, and for a family was $36,813. Males had a median income of $31,141 versus $18,077 for females. The per capita income for the city was $16,656. About 11.5% of families and 13.8% of the population were below the poverty line, including 18.1% of those under age 18 and 11.5% of those age 65 or over.

== Economy ==
The Valero McKee Refinery is located several miles southwest of Sunray. It processes 200,000 barrels of oil per day and has 475 full-time personnel.

== Education ==
The City of Sunray is served by the Sunray Independent School District and home to the Sunray High School Bobcats.
