= Sunray Independent School District =

School district in Texas

Sunray Independent School District is a public school district based in Sunray, Texas (USA). Located in Moore County, the district extends into a portion of Sherman County.

In 2009, the school district was rated "recognized" by the Texas Education Agency.

== Schools ==
- Sunray High School
- Sunray Middle School
- Sunray Elementary School
