= Dumas High School (Texas) =

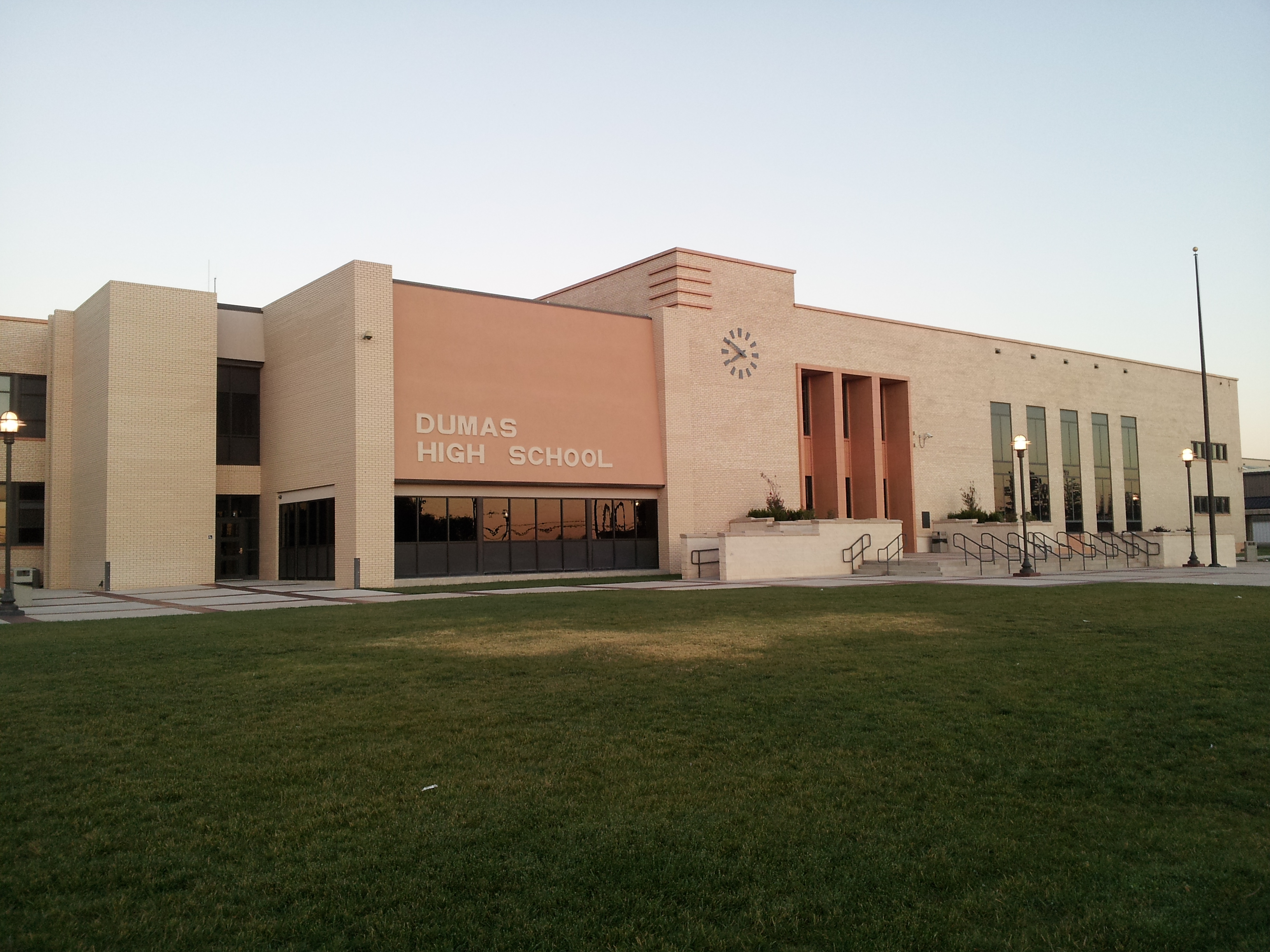

Location
- 300 South Klein; Dumas, Texas 79029; United States; 35.8632°N 101.9779°W

Information
- School type: Public high school
- School district: Dumas Independent School District
- Principal: Carl Clements
- Teaching staff: 82.88 (on an FTE basis)
- Grades: 9-12
- Enrollment: 1,151 (2023-2024)
- Student to teacher ratio: 13.89
- Colors: Orange & Black
- Athletics conference: UIL Class AAAA
- Mascot: Demons/Demonettes
- Yearbook: The Demon
- Website: Dumas High School

Dumas High School is a public high school located in the city of Dumas, Texas, United States, and classified as a 4A school by the UIL. It is a part of the Dumas Independent School District located in central Moore County. In 2015, the school was rated "Met Standard" by the Texas Education Agency.

== Athletics ==
The Dumas Demons and Demonettes compete in these sports -

Volleyball, Cross Country, Football, Basketball, Wrestling, Powerlifting, Soccer, Golf, Tennis, Track, Softball & Baseball

=== State Titles ===
- Boys Soccer 2020-
  - 1971(3A) 2022 (4a)
- Boys Basketball -
  - 1962(3A), 1971(3A)
- Girls Basketball -
  - 1980(3A)
- Football -
  - 1961(3A), 1962(3A)
- Volleyball -
  - 1988(4A), 1989(4A), 1990(4A), 1998(4A), 2006(4A)
- Wrestling 2016(5A)

== Gallery ==
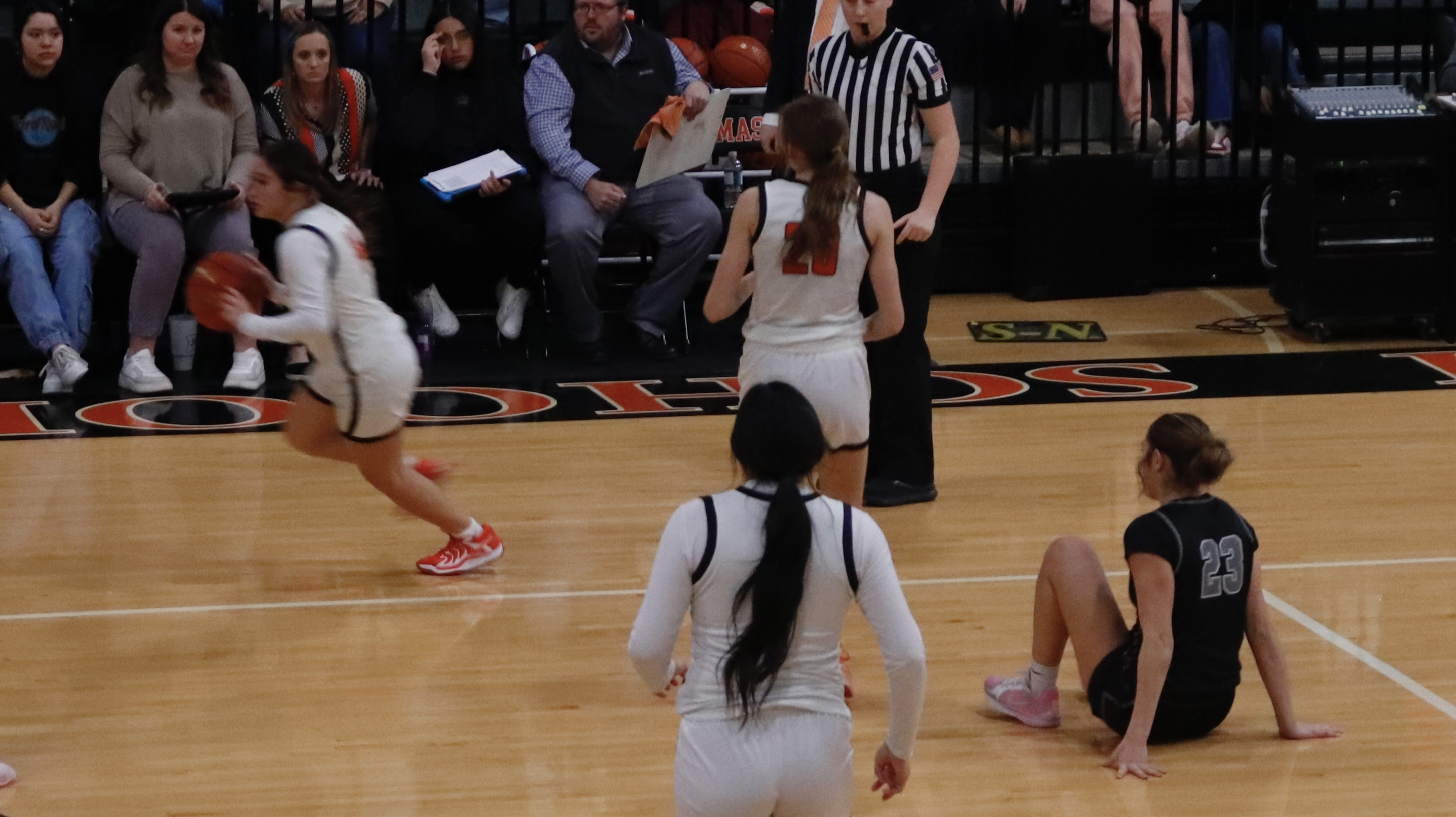
Girls Basketball players at DHS

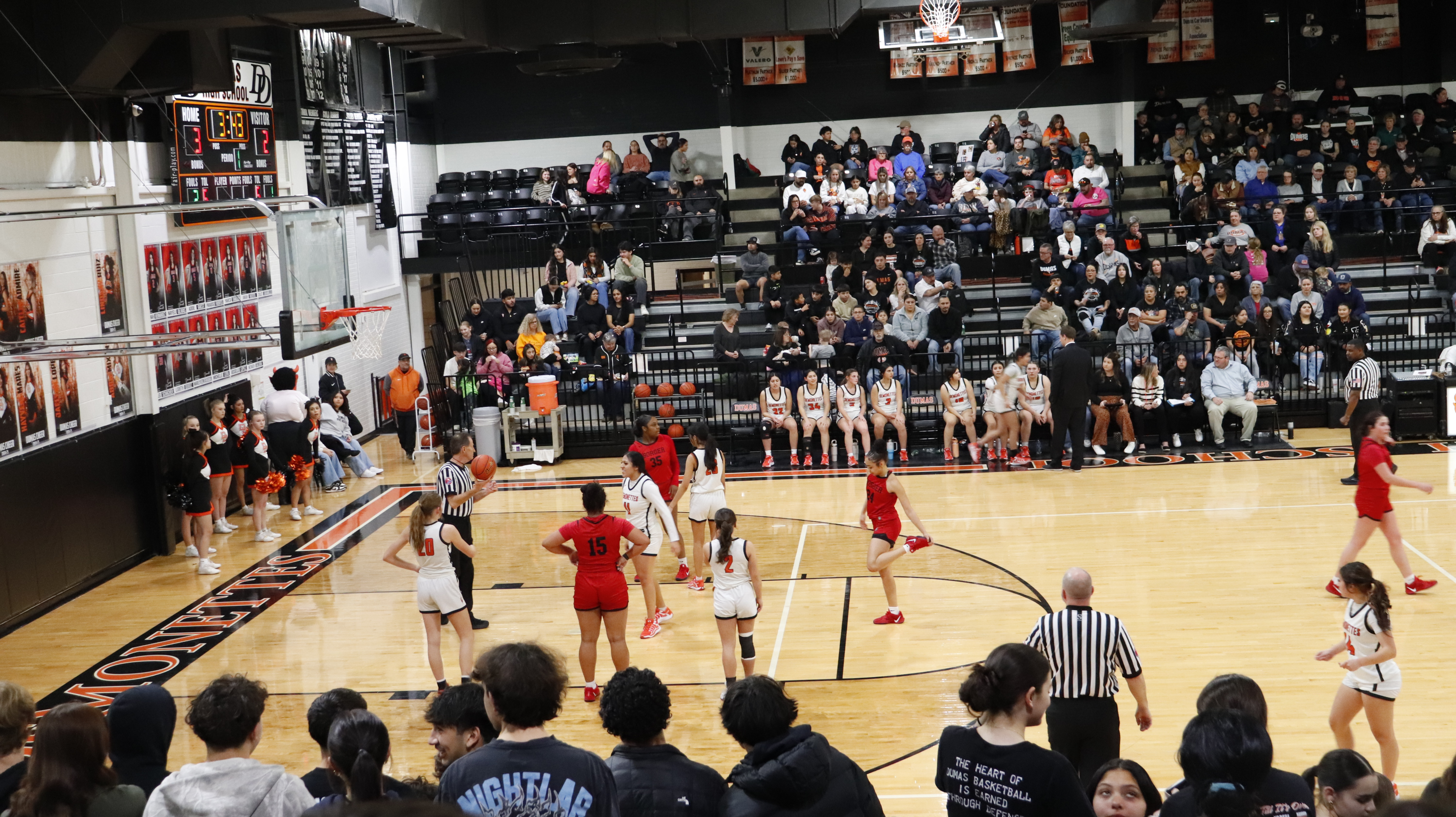
Dumas Basketball Game versus Borger
