= Moore County Airport (Texas) =

- IATA: none; ICAO: none; FAA LID: DUX

Summary
- Airport type: Public
- Owner: Moore County
- Operator: Brandon Cox
- Serves: Dumas
- Location: Texas
- Elevation AMSL: 3,706 ft (1,130 m)
- Coordinates: 35°51′26″N 102°00′47″W

Map
- Location within Texas

Runways
Direction	Length		Surface
Direction	ft	m	Surface
1/19	6,001	1,829	Asphalt
14/32	3,100	945	Asphalt

Statistics (2017)
- Aircraft operations (year ending October 11, 2017): 10,210
- Based aircraft: 14
- Source: Federal Aviation Administration

Moore County Airport (FAA LID: DUX), is located in Dumas, Texas, United States.

== Facilities and aircraft ==
Moore County Airport is situated on 326 acres in Dumas, Texas, 2-miles west of the central business district, and contains two runways. The primary 1/19, is paved with asphalt, measuring 6,001 x 100 ft (1,829 x 30 m). The second runway, 14/32, is also paved with asphalt, measuring 3,100 x 60 ft (945 x 18 m).

For the 12-month period ending October 11, 2017, the airport had 10,210 aircraft operations, an average of 28 per day: 99% general aviation, and <1% military aviation. At that time there were 14 aircraft based at this airport: 11 single-engine and 3 multi-engine.

Moore County Airport has three certified instrument approach procedures (IAP): Two RNAV (GPS) and one VOR-A approaches.

== See also ==
- List of airports in Texas
