= Dumas, Texas =

- City
- City of Dumas
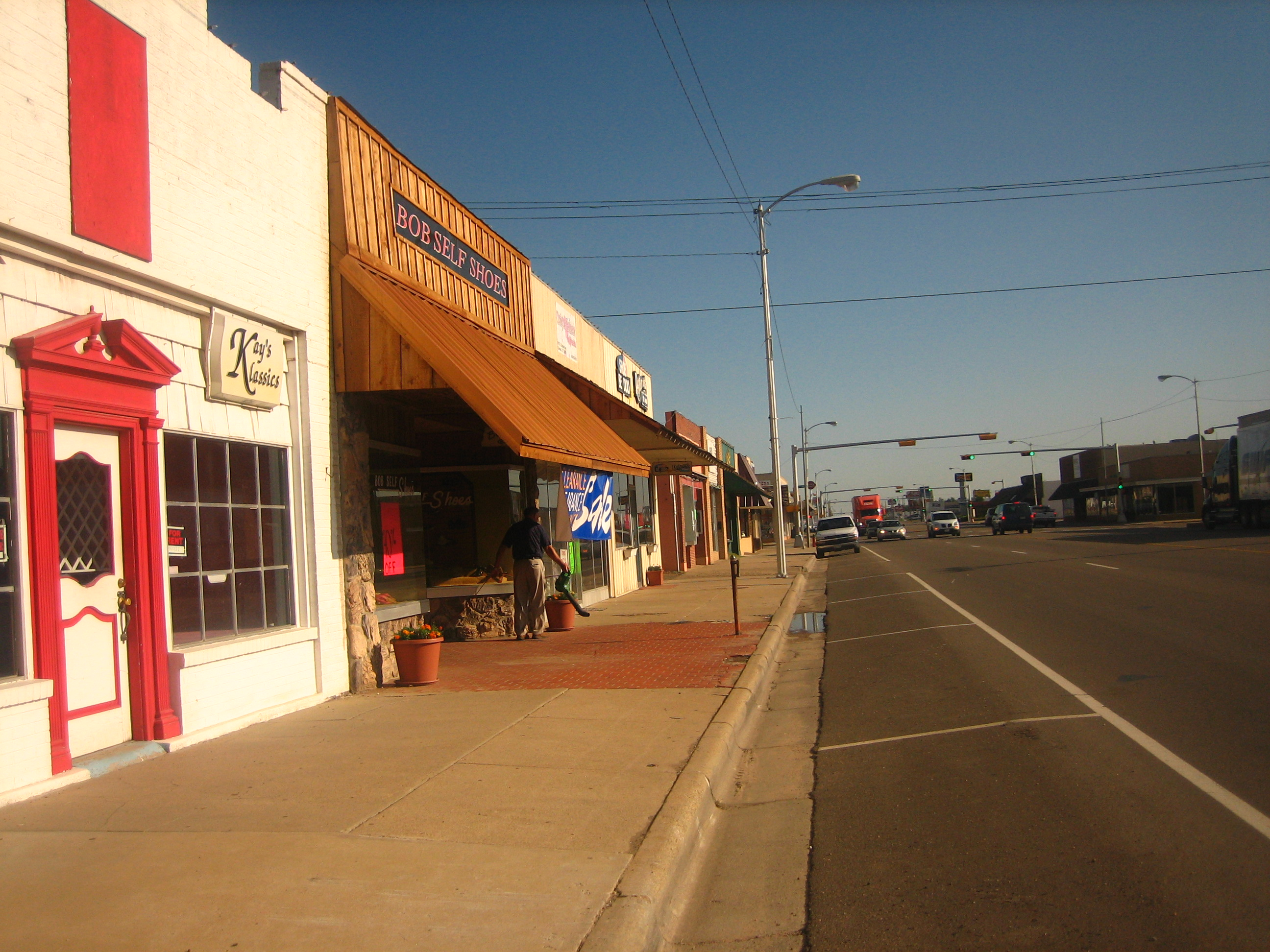
- Downtown Dumas, 2008

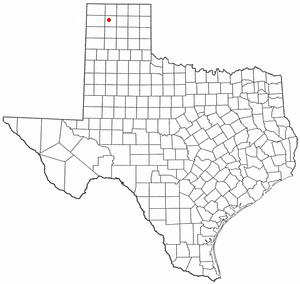
- Location of Dumas, Texas

- Coordinates: 35°51′45″N 101°57′50″W
- Country: USA
- State: Texas
- County: Moore

Government
  - Type: Commission-Manager
  - Mayor: Bob Brinkman

Area
  - Total: 5.54 sq mi (14.36 km^{2})
  - Land: 5.53 sq mi (14.31 km^{2})
  - Water: 0.019 sq mi (0.05 km^{2})
- Elevation: 3,648 ft (1,112 m)

Population (2020)
  - Total: 14,501
  - Estimate (2022): 14,166
  - Density: 2,625/sq mi (1,013/km^{2})
- Time zone: UTC–6 (Central (CST))
  - Summer (DST): UTC–5 (CDT)
- ZIP code: 79029
- Area code: 806
- FIPS code: 48-21556
- GNIS feature ID: 2410367
- Website: City Website

Dumas (/ˈdjuːməs/ DEW-məs) is a city in and the county seat of Moore County, Texas, United States. The population was 14,501 at the 2020 census. Located approximately 40 miles north of Amarillo, the city is named for its founder, Louis Dumas (1856–1923). Dumas Avenue, the main thoroughfare, is also United States Highways 87 and 287.

Window on the Plains Museum, which offers exhibits on Moore County and the Texas Panhandle, is located on South Dumas Avenue, the main thoroughfare. Dumas is home to Moore County Airport, a general-aviation airport two miles west of the central business district.

The Dumas government claims, with some documentation, that the song "I'm a Ding Dong Daddy From Dumas" was written about the city. Composed in the late 1920s by Phil Baxter (a native Texan who lived for a time in Dumas) and Carl Moore, the song has also sometimes been claimed by Dumas in Desha County in southeastern Arkansas.

== Geography ==
According to the United States Census Bureau, the city has a total area of 5.52 square miles (14.3 km^{2}), of which 5.5 square miles (14 km^{2}) are land and 0.019 square miles (0.049 km^{2}) (0.34%) is water.

== Demographics ==
Historical population
Census	Pop.	Note	%±
1940	2,117		—
1950	6,127		189.4%
1960	8,477		38.4%
1970	9,771		15.3%
1980	12,194		24.8%
1990	12,871		5.6%
2000	13,747		6.8%
2010	14,691		6.9%
2020	14,501		−1.3%
2022 (est.)	14,166		−2.3%
U.S. Decennial Census

=== 2020 census ===
As of the 2020 census, Dumas had a population of 14,501 and a median age of 31.5 years. 29.9% of residents were under the age of 18 and 12.1% of residents were 65 years of age or older. For every 100 females there were 99.2 males, and for every 100 females age 18 and over there were 97.3 males age 18 and over.

99.7% of residents lived in urban areas, while 0.3% lived in rural areas.

There were 4,988 households in Dumas, of which 42.0% had children under the age of 18 living in them. Of all households, 53.1% were married-couple households, 18.0% were households with a male householder and no spouse or partner present, and 22.8% were households with a female householder and no spouse or partner present. About 21.5% of all households were made up of individuals and 8.9% had someone living alone who was 65 years of age or older. Of those households, 3,195 were families.

There were 5,572 housing units, of which 10.5% were vacant. The homeowner vacancy rate was 1.6% and the rental vacancy rate was 14.7%.

Racial composition as of the 2020 census
Race	Number	Percent
White	6,794	46.9%
Black or African American	306	2.1%
American Indian and Alaska Native	272	1.9%
Asian	657	4.5%
Native Hawaiian and Other Pacific Islander	1	0.0%
Some other race	3,485	24.0%
Two or more races	2,986	20.6%
Hispanic or Latino (of any race)	8,671	59.8%

=== 2010 census ===
As of the census of 2010, 14,691 people (an increase of 6.9% from the 2000 Census), 4,979 households, and 3,725 families resided in the city. The population density was 2,660 inhabitants per square mile (1,030/km^{2}). The 5,340 housing units averaged 1047 per square mile (650.6/km^{2}). The racial makeup of the city was 74.9% White, 2% African American, 0.9% Native American, 4.7% Asian, 15.6% from other races, and 1.8% from two or more races. Hispanics or Latino of any race were 50.5% of the population.

Of the 4,979 households, 38.6% had children under the age of 18 living with them, 56.7% were married couples living together, 12.1% had a female householder with no husband present, and 25.2% were not families. About 20.9% of all households were made up of individuals living alone, and 8% had someone living alone who was 65 years of age or older. The average household size was 2.92 and the average family size was 3.40.

In the city, the population was distributed as 31.4% under the age of 18, 7.9% from 15 to 19, 33.3% from 25 to 44, 21.8% from 45 to 64, and 10.7% who were 65 years of age or older. For every 100 females, there were 101 males. Of the population over the age of 18, for every 100 females, there were 98 males.

The median income for a household in the city was $44,298, and for a family was $52,536. Males had a median income of $37,589 versus $25,498 for females. The per capita income for the city was $18,614. About 8.3% of families and 11.4% of the population were below the poverty line, including 19% of those under age 18 and 6.3% of those age 65 or over.

== Government ==
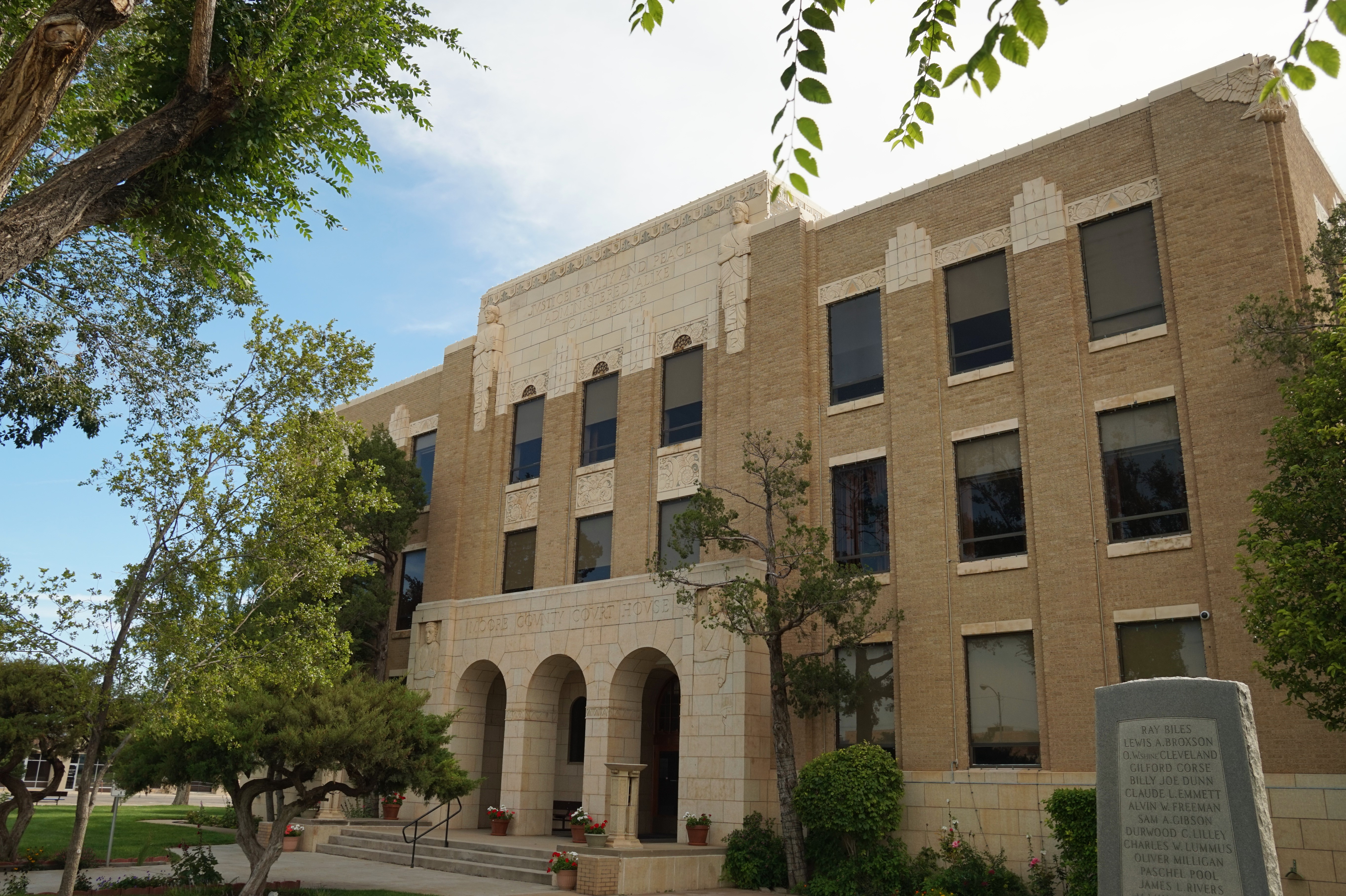
Moore County Courthouse

The City of Dumas describes its government as a commission-manager government with a mayor and four commissioners all elected from the city at-large, and a city manager appointed by the commission to serve as the administrative manager of the city.

== Economy ==
A large meatpacking plant in Cactus is a major employer for Moore County. The plant was formerly owned by Swift, and is now owned by a Brazilian conglomerate, JBS USA. The plant processes up to 5,000 head of cattle per day, and has a predominantly immigrant workforce.

== Education ==
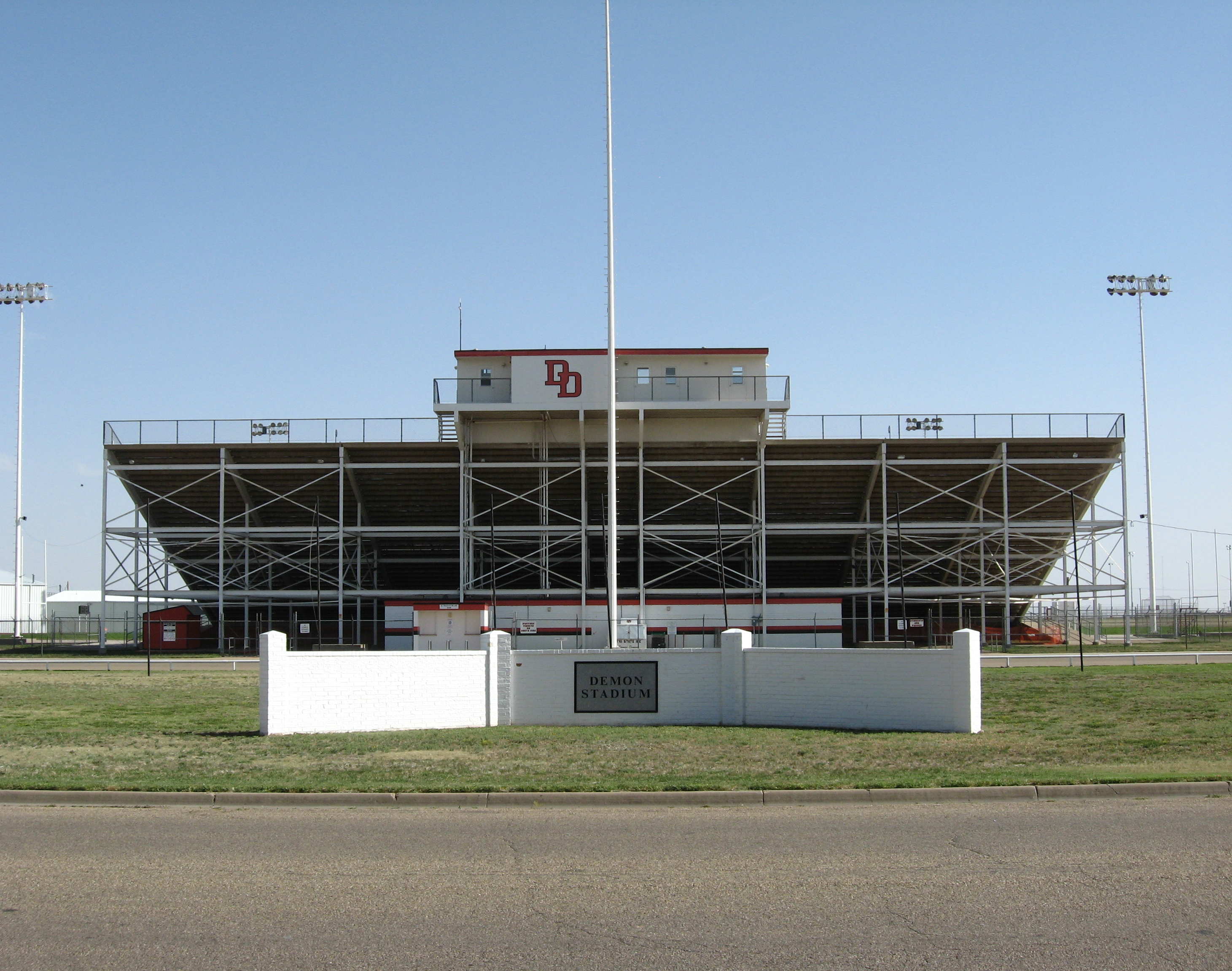
Demon Stadium in Dumas

Dumas Independent School district serves the cities of Dumas and Cactus.

=== Secondary schools ===
- Dumas High School (Dumas, grades 9–12)
- Dumas Junior High School (Dumas, grades 7–8)
  - 1999–2000 National Blue Ribbon School
- Dumas Intermediate School (Dumas, grades 5–6)

=== Primary schools ===
- Dumas Intermediate School (Dumas)
- Green Acres Elementary School (Dumas)
- Hillcrest Elementary School (Dumas)
- Morningside Elementary School (Dumas)
- Sunset Elementary School (Dumas) National Blue Ribbon School 2022–2023
- Cactus Elementary School (Cactus)
- Dumas North Elementary (Dumas) as of 2023
- Dumas South Elementary (Dumas) as of 2024

=== Alternative schools ===
The North Plains Opportunity Center is an alternative school located within the Dumas Independent School District. The primary function of the school is to provide an alternative education for students who are at risk of dropping out of school, needing to recover lost credits, or desire to accelerate their education experiences to pursue college or career goals.

=== Colleges ===
Amarillo College, a two-year, fully accredited community college, has a branch campus in Dumas.

== Notable people ==
- Joe "King" Carrasco, born in Dumas
- Tommy Shannon, Bassist who is best known as a member of Stevie Ray Vaughan & Double Trouble
- David A. Swinford, Republican former State Representative and lobbyist

== Gallery ==
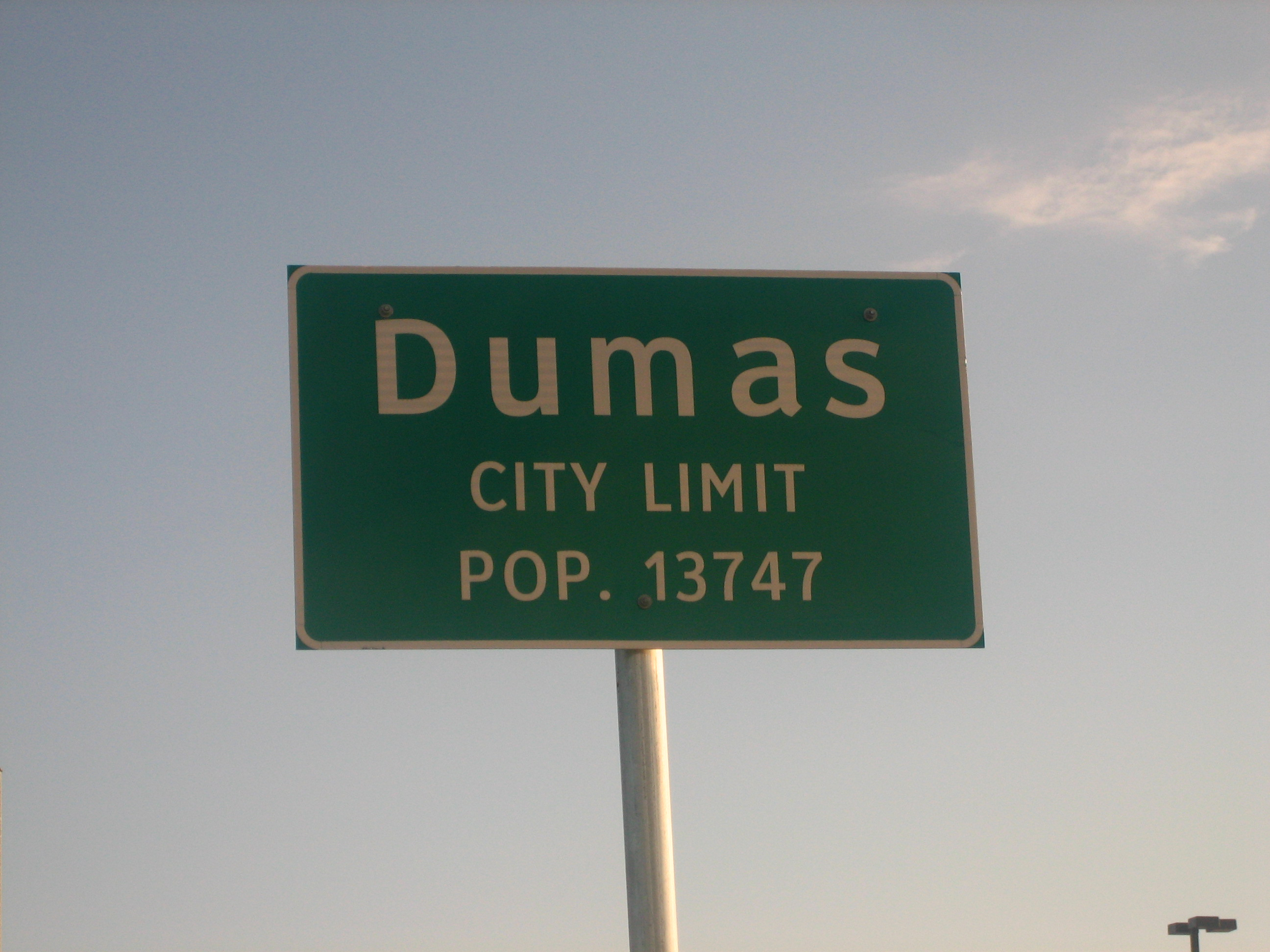
Entrance sign to Dumas

Louis Dumas (1856–1923), the founder of Dumas, c. 1895

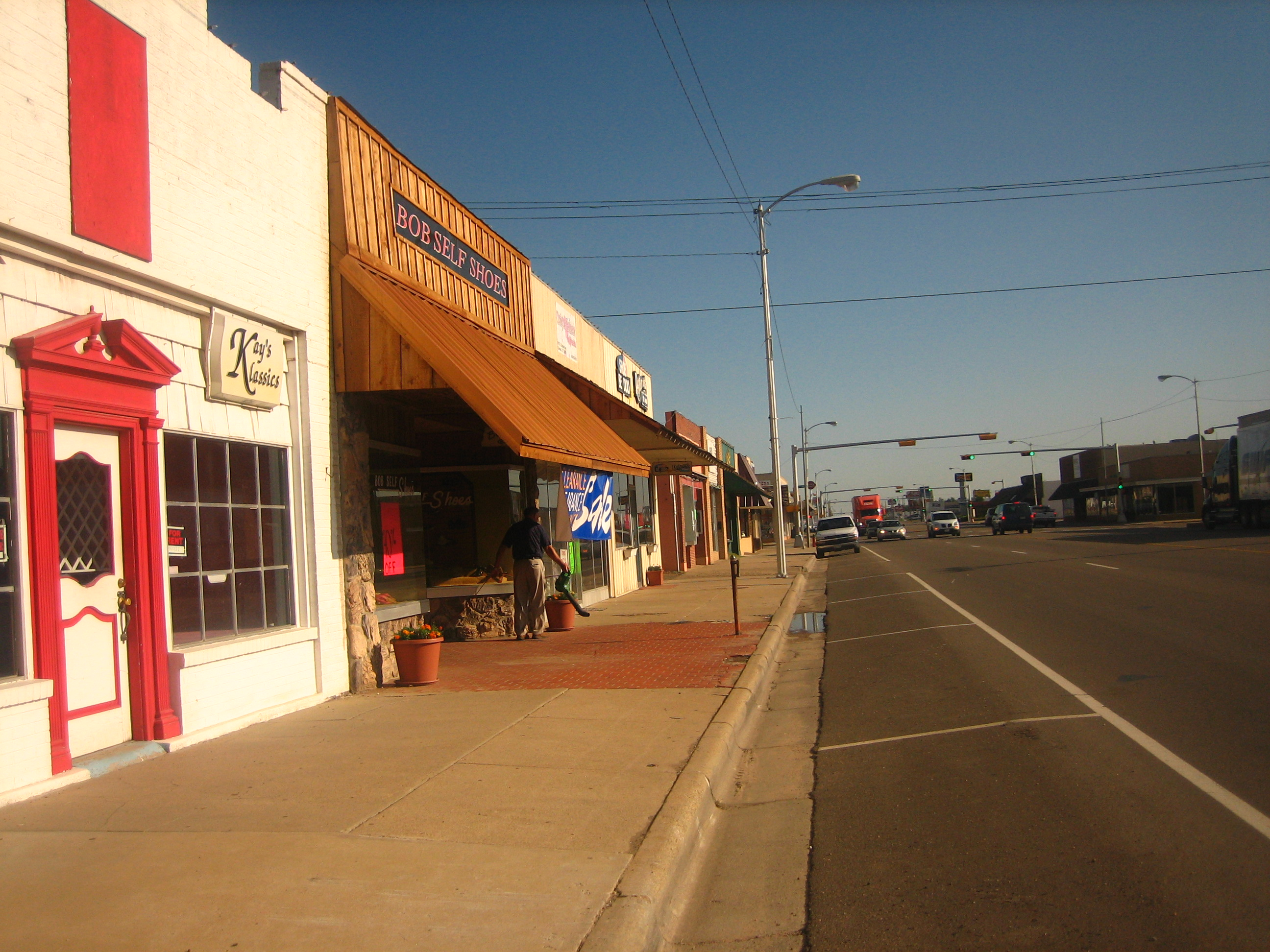
A view of downtown Dumas

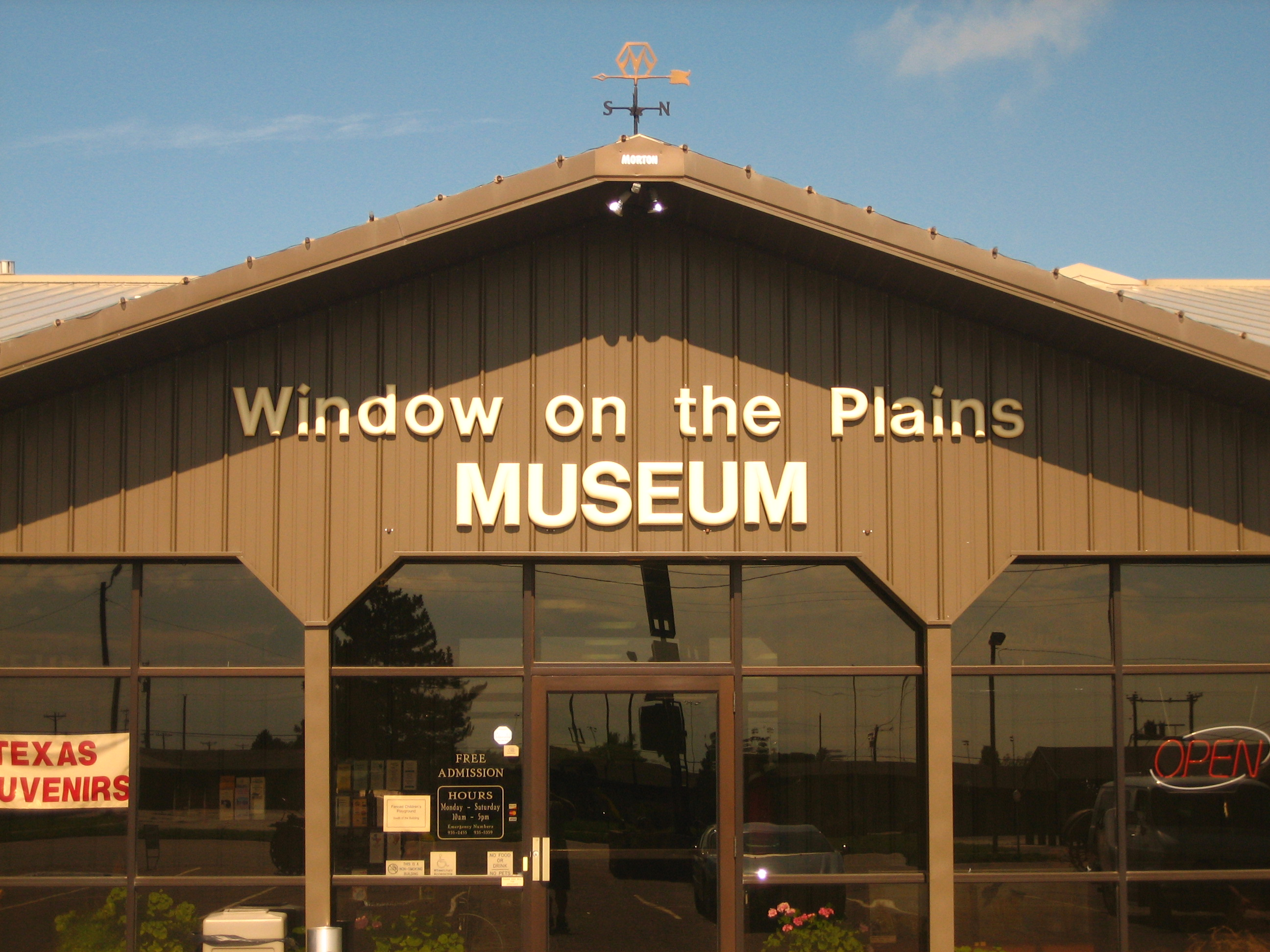
Entrance to Window on the Plains Museum in Dumas

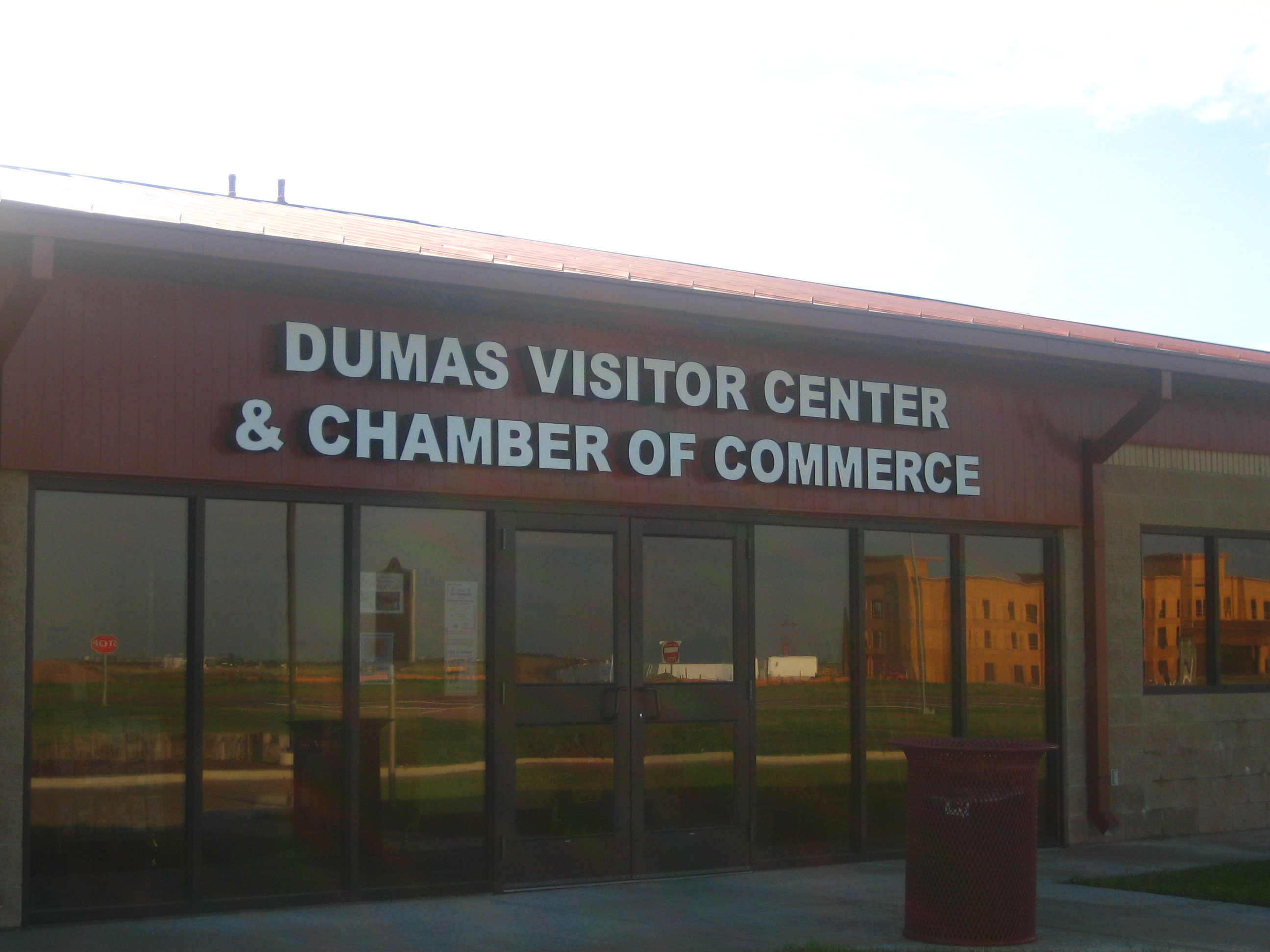
Dumas Visitor Center and Chamber of Commerce office on United States Highway 287 south

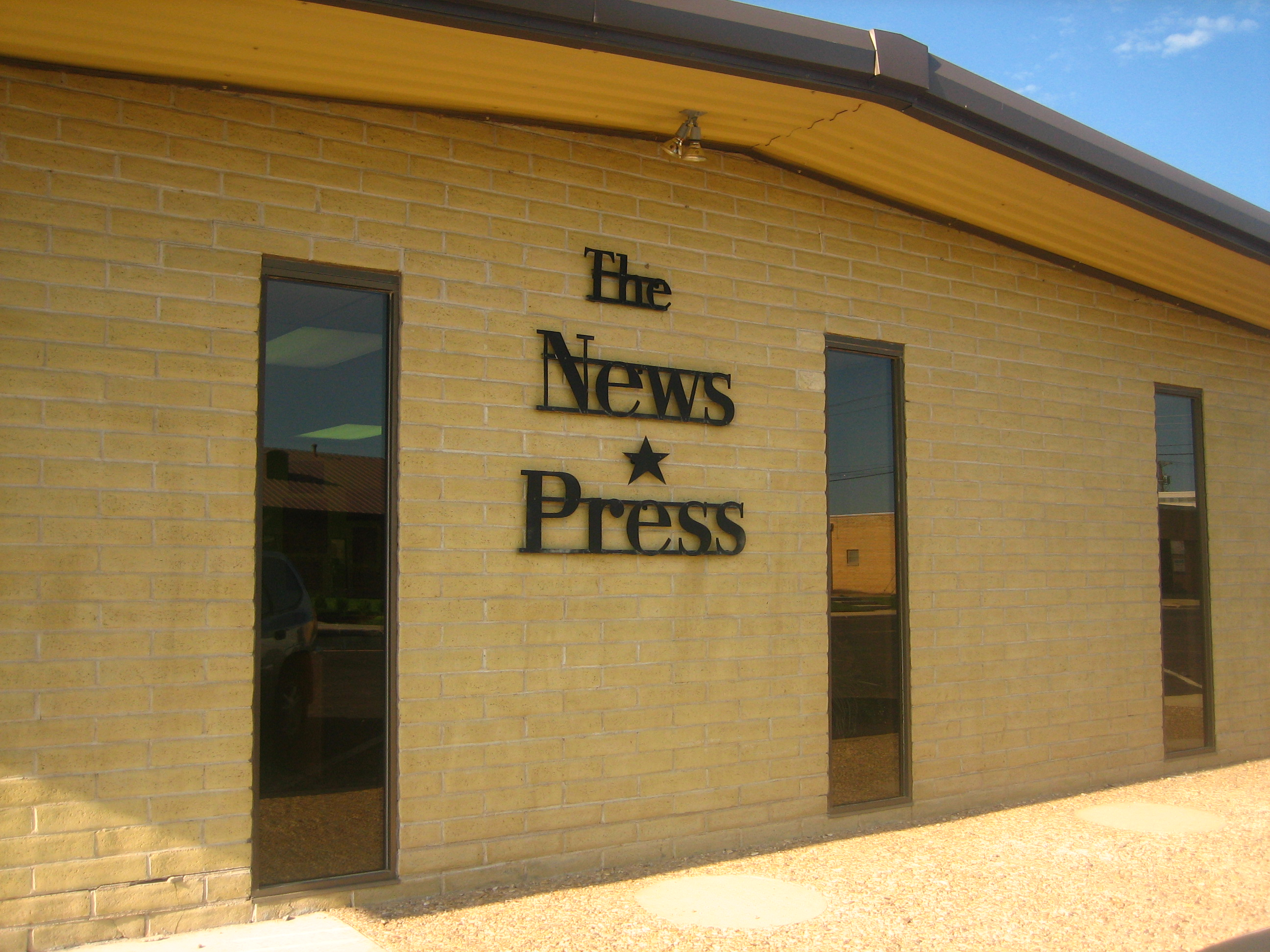
The Moore County News-Press office; a local newspaper published Wednesdays and Saturdays

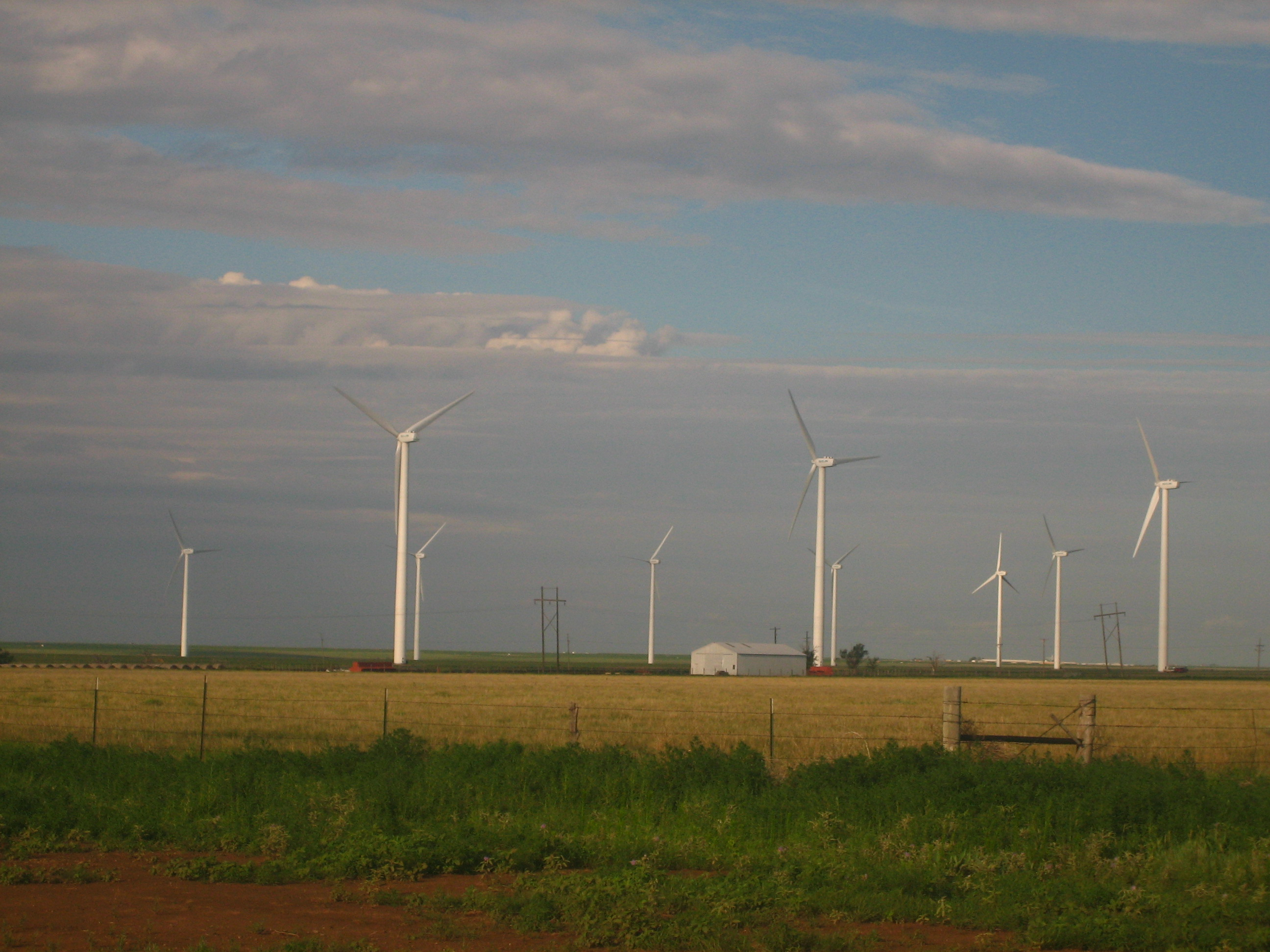
Wind turbines south of Dumas

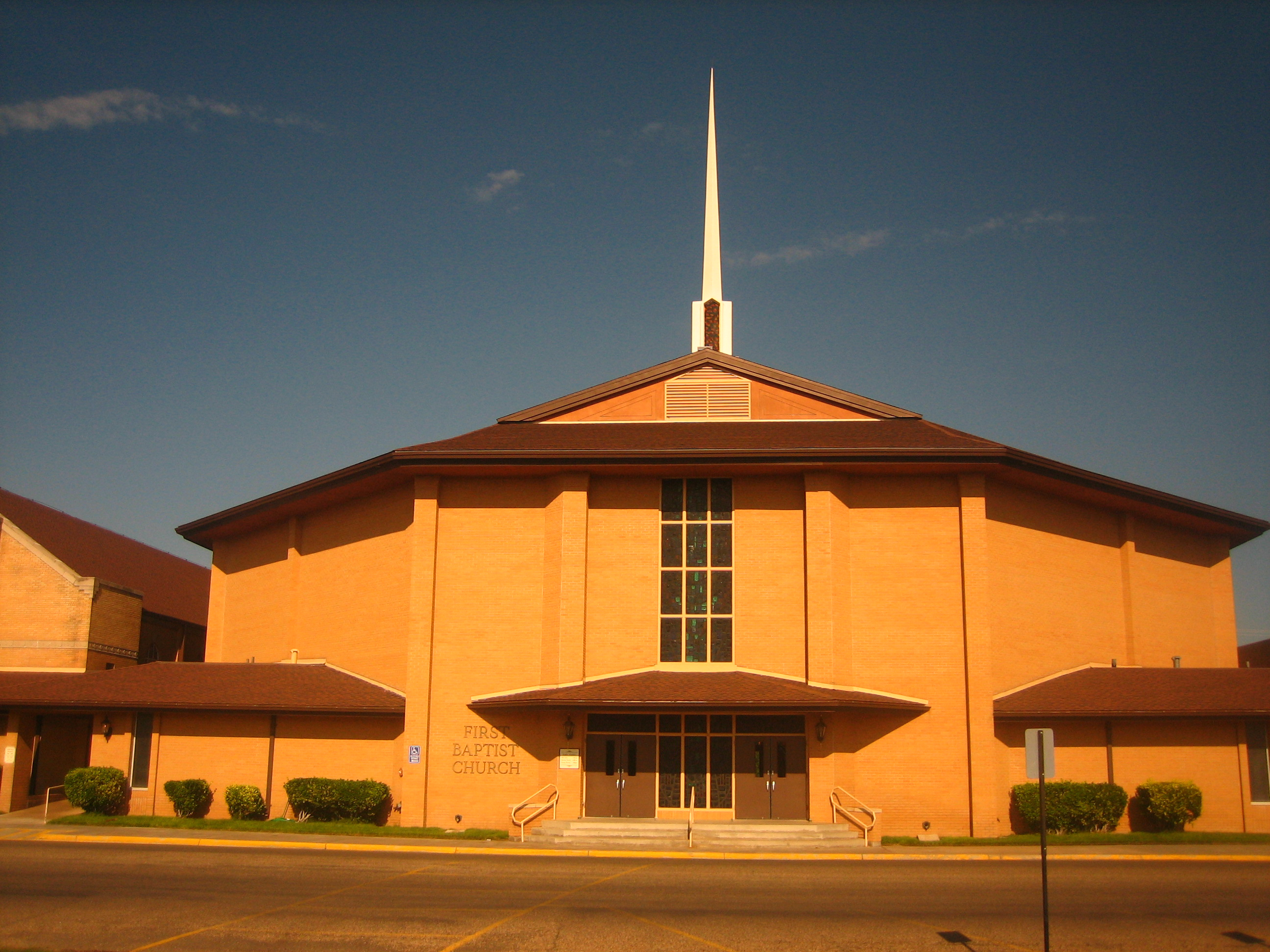
The First Baptist Church of Dumas

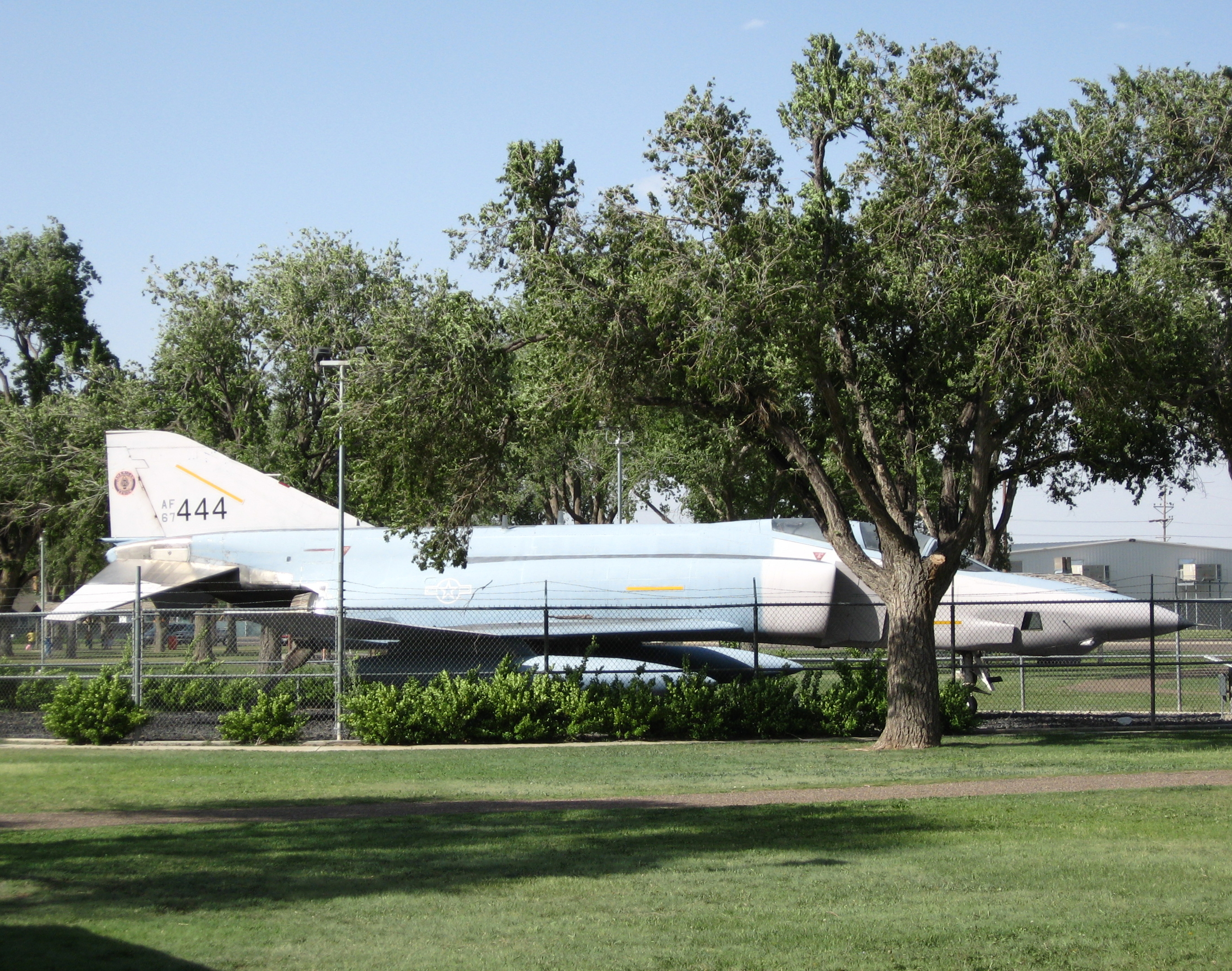
An F-4 Phantom II in McDade Park in Dumas

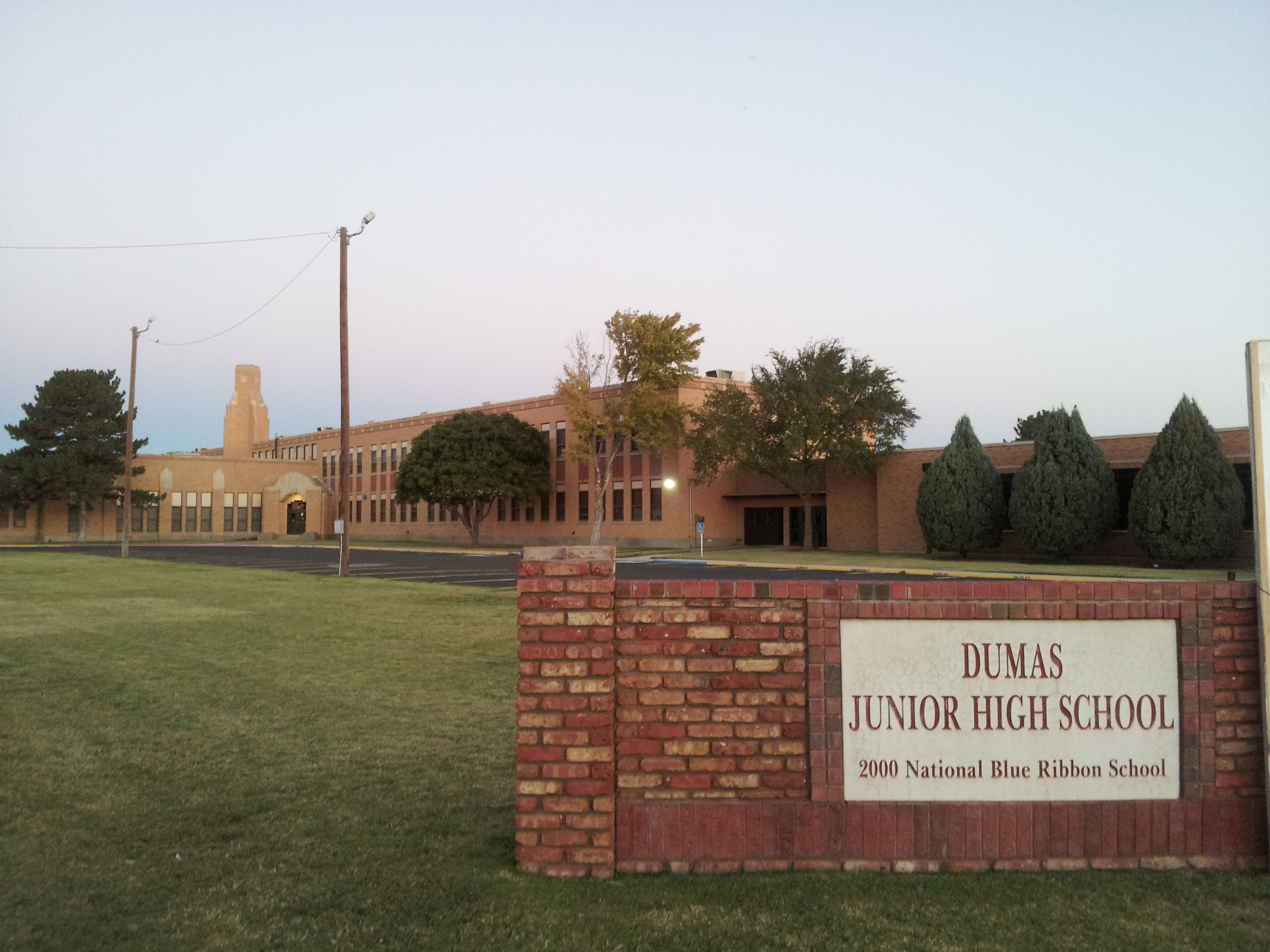
Dumas Junior High School, 2013

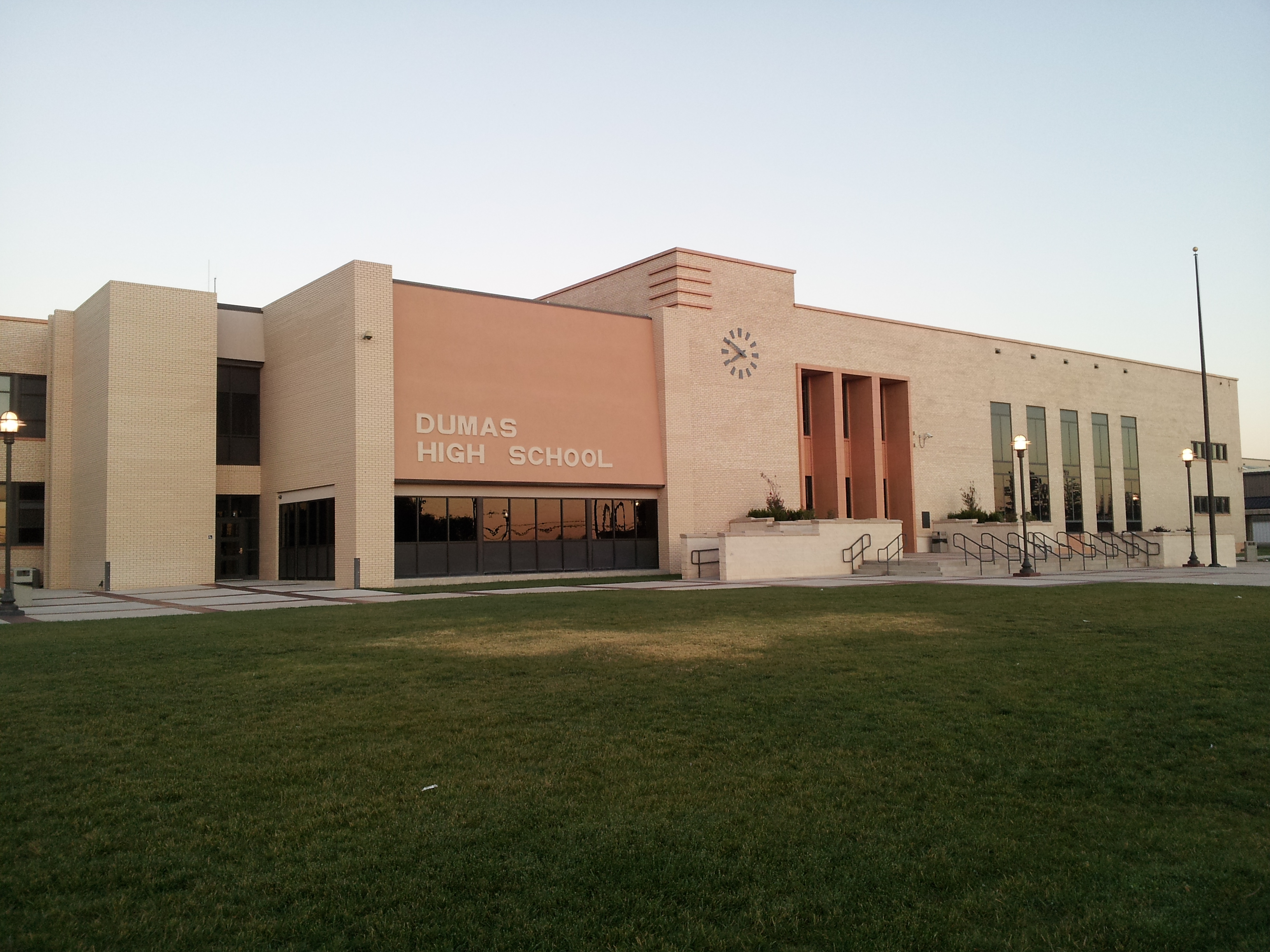
Dumas High School, 2013

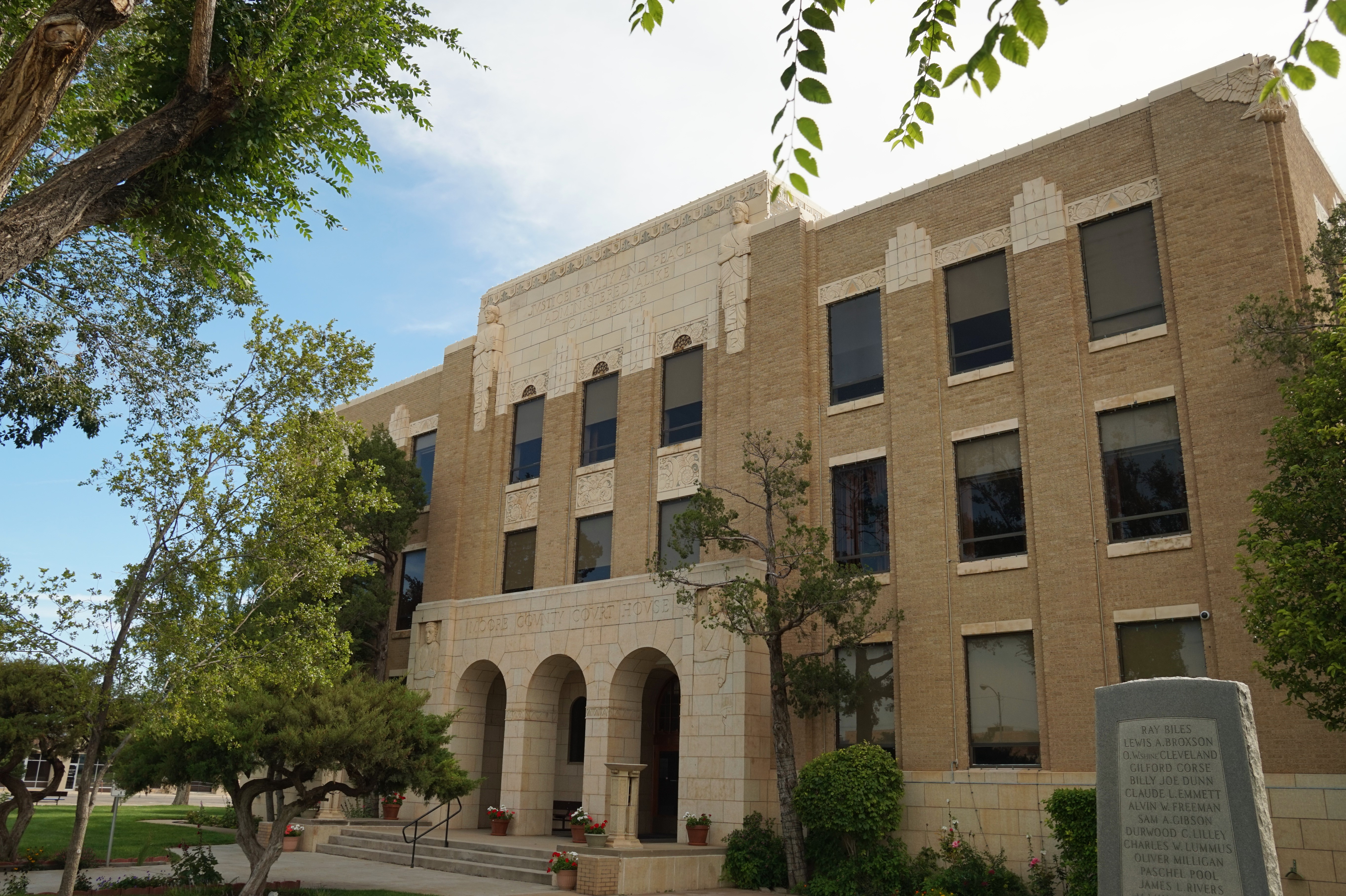
Moore County Courthouse in Dumas on 20 August 2017

== Climate ==
According to the Köppen climate classification system, Dumas has a semiarid climate, BSk on climate maps.

Climate data for Dumas, Texas
Month	Jan	Feb	Mar	Apr	May	Jun	Jul	Aug	Sep	Oct	Nov	Dec	Year
Record high °F (°C)	79 (26)	80 (27)	90 (32)	99 (37)	100 (38)	106 (41)	109 (43)	108 (42)	105 (41)	96 (36)	83 (28)	79 (26)	109 (43)
Mean daily maximum °F (°C)	48.7 (9.3)	52.3 (11.3)	60.6 (15.9)	69.1 (20.6)	78.2 (25.7)	86.9 (30.5)	91.2 (32.9)	89.2 (31.8)	82.0 (27.8)	71.0 (21.7)	59.0 (15.0)	48.1 (8.9)	69.7 (20.9)
Mean daily minimum °F (°C)	21.0 (−6.1)	23.6 (−4.7)	30.6 (−0.8)	39.2 (4.0)	49.5 (9.7)	59.1 (15.1)	64.2 (17.9)	63.3 (17.4)	54.9 (12.7)	42.4 (5.8)	30.7 (−0.7)	22.0 (−5.6)	41.7 (5.4)
Record low °F (°C)	−18 (−28)	−5 (−21)	−2 (−19)	13 (−11)	29 (−2)	40 (4)	47 (8)	49 (9)	32 (0)	23 (−5)	4 (−16)	−1 (−18)	−18 (−28)
Average precipitation inches (mm)	0.47 (12)	0.57 (14)	1.15 (29)	1.31 (33)	2.76 (70)	2.48 (63)	2.44 (62)	2.48 (63)	1.90 (48)	1.14 (29)	0.68 (17)	0.51 (13)	17.89 (454)
Average snowfall inches (cm)	3.0 (7.6)	1.4 (3.6)	2.2 (5.6)	0.3 (0.76)	0 (0)	0 (0)	0 (0)	0 (0)	0 (0)	0.1 (0.25)	1.0 (2.5)	3.5 (8.9)	11.5 (29)
