= Moore County, Texas =

County in Texas, United States

- County
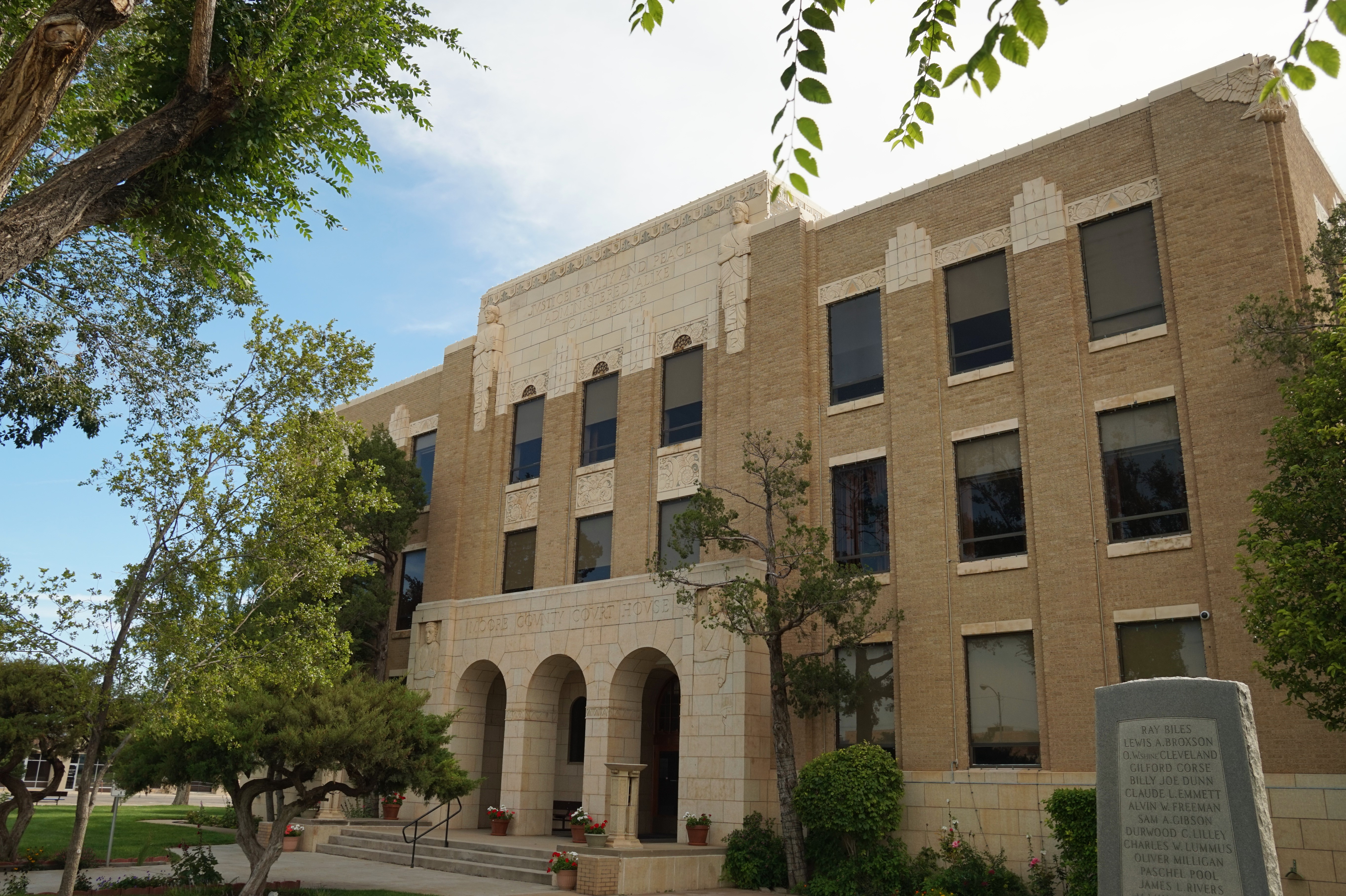
- Moore County Courthouse in Dumas

- Location within the U.S. state of Texas
- Coordinates: 35°50′N 101°53′W
- Country: United States
- State: Texas
- Founded: 1892
- Named for: Edwin Ward Moore
- Seat: Dumas
- Largest city: Dumas

Government
  - County Judge: Rowdy Rhoades

Area
  - Total: 910 sq mi (2,400 km^{2})
  - Land: 900 sq mi (2,300 km^{2})
  - Water: 9.9 sq mi (26 km^{2}) 1.1%

Population (2020)
  - Total: 21,358
  - Estimate (2025): 21,891 ▲
  - Density: 23/sq mi (8.9/km^{2})
- Time zone: UTC−6 (Central)
  - Summer (DST): UTC−5 (CDT)
- Congressional district: 13th
- Website: www.co.moore.tx.us

Moore County is a county located in the U.S. state of Texas. As of the 2020 census, its population was 21,358. The county seat is Dumas. The county was created in 1876 and organized in 1892. It is named for Edwin Ward Moore, the commander of the Texas Navy. The Dumas micropolitan statistical area includes all of Moore County.

Moore County history is highlighted in the Window on the Plains Museum in Dumas.

== History ==
About 100 million years ago, the land that Moore County encompasses was part of the Western Interior Seaway.

The people of the Antelope Creek phase inhabited the southeastern portion of Moore County in the Canadian River Valley, around 1200 to 1450 AD.

== Geography ==
According to the U.S. Census Bureau, the county has a total area of 910 square miles (2,400 km^{2}), of which 9.9 sq mi (26 km^{2}) (1.1%) are covered by water.

=== Major highways ===
- U.S. Highway 87
- U.S. Highway 287
- State Highway 136
- State Highway 152
- State Highway 354

=== Adjacent counties ===
- Sherman County (north)
- Hutchinson County (east)
- Carson County (southeast)
- Potter County (south)
- Oldham County (southwest)
- Hartley County (west)
- Dallam County (northwest)

=== National protected area ===
- Lake Meredith National Recreation Area (part)

== Demographics ==
Historical population
Census	Pop.	Note	%±
1890	15		—
1900	209		1,293.3%
1910	561		168.4%
1920	571		1.8%
1930	1,555		172.3%
1940	4,461		186.9%
1950	13,349		199.2%
1960	14,773		10.7%
1970	14,060		−4.8%
1980	16,575		17.9%
1990	17,865		7.8%
2000	20,121		12.6%
2010	21,904		8.9%
2020	21,358		−2.5%
2025 (est.)	21,891	▲	2.5%
U.S. Decennial Census; 1850–1900 1910; 1920 1930 1940 1950 1960 1970 1980 1990 2000; 2010 2020

=== 2020 census ===
As of the 2020 census, the county had a population of 21,358. The median age was 31.9 years. 30.0% of residents were under the age of 18 and 11.4% of residents were 65 years of age or older. For every 100 females there were 104.7 males, and for every 100 females age 18 and over there were 104.9 males age 18 and over.

The racial makeup of the county was 44.2% White, 3.3% Black or African American, 2.0% American Indian and Alaska Native, 4.7% Asian, <0.1% Native Hawaiian and Pacific Islander, 25.3% from some other race, and 20.5% from two or more races. Hispanic or Latino residents of any race comprised 59.2% of the population.

68.5% of residents lived in urban areas, while 31.5% lived in rural areas.

There were 7,258 households in the county, of which 42.1% had children under the age of 18 living in them. Of all households, 53.4% were married-couple households, 19.8% were households with a male householder and no spouse or partner present, and 21.1% were households with a female householder and no spouse or partner present. About 20.6% of all households were made up of individuals and 7.9% had someone living alone who was 65 years of age or older.

There were 8,188 housing units, of which 11.4% were vacant. Among occupied housing units, 63.3% were owner-occupied and 36.7% were renter-occupied. The homeowner vacancy rate was 1.9% and the rental vacancy rate was 14.2%.

=== Racial and ethnic composition ===
Moore County, Texas – Racial and ethnic composition Note: the US Census treats Hispanic/Latino as an ethnic category. This table excludes Latinos from the racial categories and assigns them to a separate category. Hispanics/Latinos may be of any race.
Race / Ethnicity (NH = Non-Hispanic)	Pop 2000	Pop 2010	Pop 2020	% 2000	% 2010	% 2020
White alone (NH)	10,038	8,370	6,499	49.89%	38.21%	30.43%
Black or African American alone (NH)	89	287	654	0.44%	1.31%	3.06%
Native American or Alaska Native alone (NH)	77	107	97	0.38%	0.49%	0.45%
Asian alone (NH)	166	1,323	982	0.83%	6.04%	4.60%
Native Hawaiian or Pacific Islander alone (NH)	5	18	1	0.02%	0.08%	0.00%
Other race alone (NH)	25	61	83	0.12%	0.28%	0.39%
Mixed race or Multiracial (NH)	163	196	395	0.81%	0.89%	1.85%
Hispanic or Latino (any race)	9,558	11,542	12,647	47.50%	52.69%	59.21%
Total	20,121	21,904	21,358	100.00%	100.00%	100.00%

=== 2000 Census ===
At the 2000 census, 20,121 people, 6,774 households, and 5,331 families were in the county. The population density was 22 people/mi^{2} (8.5 people/km^{2}). There were 7,478 housing units at an average density of 8 units per square mile (3.1/km^{2}). The racial makeup of the county was 63.93% White, 0.69% Black or African American, 0.67% Native American, 0.86% Asian, 0.03% Pacific Islander, 31.20% from other races, and 2.62% from two or more races. 47.50% of the population were Hispanic or Latino of any race. Of the 6,774 households 44.80% had children under the age of 18 living with them, 65.10% were married couples living together, 9.00% had a female householder with no husband present, and 21.30% were non-families. 18.20% of households were one person and 8.30% were one person aged 65 or older. The average household size was 2.94 and the average family size was 3.36.

The age distribution was 33.60% under 18, 9.20% from 18 to 24, 28.40% from 25 to 44, 18.30% from 45 to 64, and 10.60% 65 or older. The median age was 30 years. For every 100 females, there were 100.60 males. For every 100 females age 18 and over, there were 97.40 males.

The median household income was $34,852 and the median family income was $37,985. Males had a median income of $29,843 versus $19,383 for females. The per capita income for the county was $15,214. About 10.10% of families and 13.50% of the population were below the poverty line, including 18.10% of those under age 18 and 10.90% of those age 65 or over.

== Politics ==
Moore County is a strongly Republican county, having given Senator John McCain 78.76% of the vote, over only 20.65% for Barack Obama in 2008. It also gave George W. Bush (R) 81.75% over 17.93% John Kerry (D) in 2004.

United States presidential election results for Moore County, Texas
Year	Republican		Democratic		Third party(ies)	
Year	No.	%	No.	%	No.	%
1912	5	6.85%	57	78.08%	11	15.07%
1916	6	5.50%	103	94.50%	0	0.00%
1920	13	11.30%	101	87.83%	1	0.87%
1924	9	9.78%	82	89.13%	1	1.09%
1928	87	41.23%	124	58.77%	0	0.00%
1932	56	9.23%	549	90.44%	2	0.33%
1936	47	7.45%	583	92.39%	1	0.16%
1940	224	18.84%	959	80.66%	6	0.50%
1944	313	22.45%	999	71.66%	82	5.88%
1948	323	15.37%	1,748	83.20%	30	1.43%
1952	1,909	47.31%	2,114	52.39%	12	0.30%
1956	1,820	44.95%	2,219	54.80%	10	0.25%
1960	2,463	61.19%	1,547	38.43%	15	0.37%
1964	1,762	42.37%	2,393	57.54%	4	0.10%
1968	2,378	47.60%	1,359	27.20%	1,259	25.20%
1972	3,620	79.77%	863	19.02%	55	1.21%
1976	2,759	49.49%	2,767	49.63%	49	0.88%
1980	3,736	66.92%	1,743	31.22%	104	1.86%
1984	4,649	80.21%	1,129	19.48%	18	0.31%
1988	3,710	70.25%	1,537	29.10%	34	0.64%
1992	3,147	57.24%	1,361	24.75%	990	18.01%
1996	3,353	65.96%	1,358	26.72%	372	7.32%
2000	4,201	79.41%	1,040	19.66%	49	0.93%
2004	4,601	81.75%	1,009	17.93%	18	0.32%
2008	4,282	78.76%	1,123	20.65%	32	0.59%
2012	3,968	79.60%	964	19.34%	53	1.06%
2016	3,977	75.26%	1,098	20.78%	209	3.96%
2020	4,359	79.01%	1,062	19.25%	96	1.74%
2024	4,458	83.14%	860	16.04%	44	0.82%

United States Senate election results for Moore County, Texas1
Year	Republican		Democratic		Third party(ies)	
Year	No.	%	No.	%	No.	%
2024	4,186	89.67%	374	8.01%	108	2.31%

United States Senate election results for Moore County, Texas2
Year	Republican		Democratic		Third party(ies)	
Year	No.	%	No.	%	No.	%
2020	4,314	79.20%	999	18.34%	134	2.46%

Texas Gubernatorial election results for Moore County
Year	Republican		Democratic		Third party(ies)	
Year	No.	%	No.	%	No.	%
2022	3,081	85.51%	479	13.29%	43	1.19%

Moore County is located within District 87 of the Texas House of Representatives. Moore County is located within District 31 of the Texas Senate. Moore County is represented in the US house of representatives by Ronny Jackson (R), as it is a part of Texas's 13th congressional district.

== Communities ==
=== Cities ===
- Cactus
- Dumas (county seat)
- Fritch (mostly in Hutchinson County)
- Sunray

=== Unincorporated community ===
- Masterson

== Education ==
School districts:

- Dumas Independent School District
- Sanford-Fritch Independent School District
- Sunray Independent School District

All of the county is in the service area of Amarillo College.

== Gallery ==
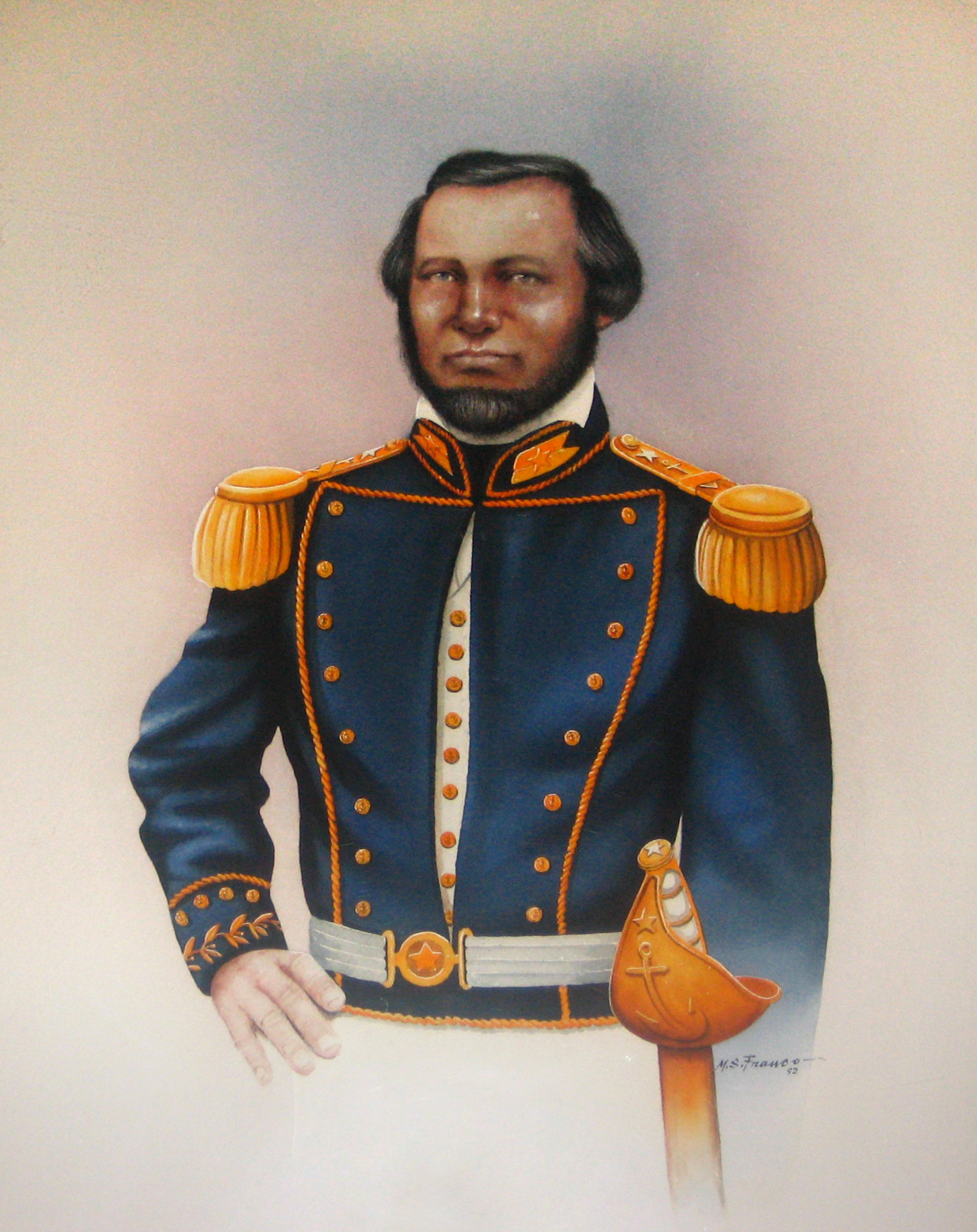
Edwin Ward Moore (1810–1865) as depicted at his namesake Moore County Courthouse

Area affected by 1930s Dust Bowl

== See also ==
- List of museums in the Texas Panhandle
- Recorded Texas Historic Landmarks in Moore County
- Impact of the 2019–20 coronavirus pandemic on the meat industry in the United States
