= Ough =

Ough may refer to:

- Ough (orthography), a letter sequence in English orthography
- Ough (surname)
- Ough, Nebraska, a community in the United States
