= North Fork Republican River =

North Fork Republican River Wi'hiuniyohe
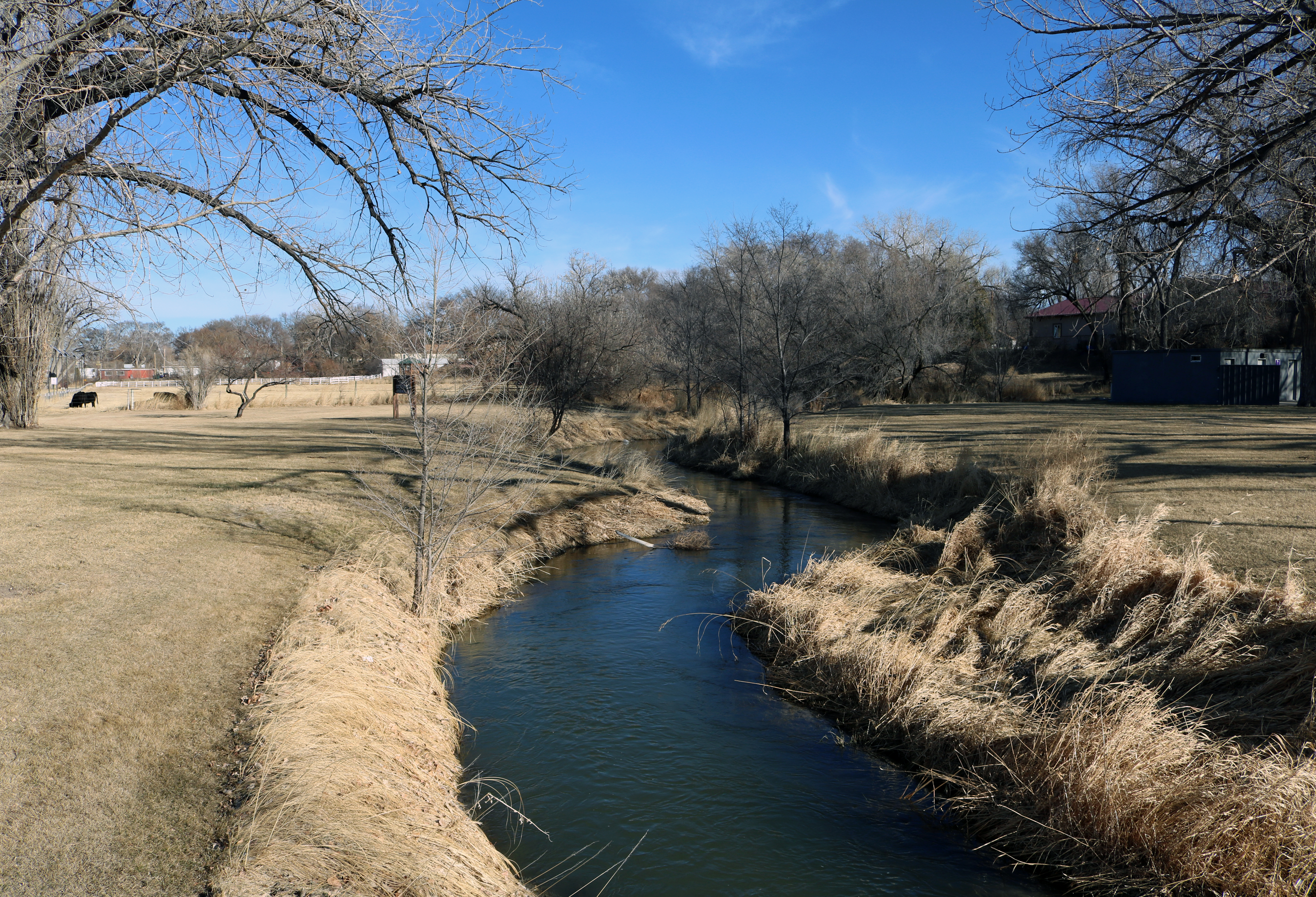
- The river in Wray, Colorado.

Location
- Country: United States
- State: Colorado, Nebraska

Physical characteristics
- Source
  - location: Yuma County, Colorado
  - coordinates: 39°59′58″N 102°27′14″W
  - elevation: 3,860 ft (1,180 m)
- Mouth: Republican River
  - location: Haigler, Nebraska
  - coordinates: 40°01′11″N 101°56′18″W
  - elevation: 3,241 ft (988 m)
- Length: 55 mi (89 km)
- Basin size: 5,086 mi^{2} (13,170 km^{2})

Basin features
- Watersheds: North Fork Republican- Republican-Kansas-Missouri- Mississippi

The North Fork Republican River is a 55.4-mile-long (89.2 km) tributary of the Republican River. It flows eastward from a source in Yuma County, Colorado to just north of Haigler in Dundy County, Nebraska. There it joins with the Arikaree River to form the Republican River.

The North Fork Republican River drains an area of 5,086 square miles (13,170 km^{2}), including 4,449 square miles (11,520 km^{2}), or 87.5%, in eastern Colorado, 575 square miles (1,490 km^{2}), or 11.3%, in southwestern Nebraska, and 62 square miles (160 km^{2}), or 1.2%, in northwestern Kansas.

Use of water from the North Fork Republican River is governed by the Republican River Compact, a water agreement among the U.S. states of Colorado, Nebraska, and Kansas signed on 1942-12-31.

== See also ==
- List of rivers in Colorado
- List of rivers in Kansas
- List of rivers in Nebraska
- Colorado drainage basins
