= South Fork Republican River =

River in Colorado, Kansas, and Nebraska, U.S.

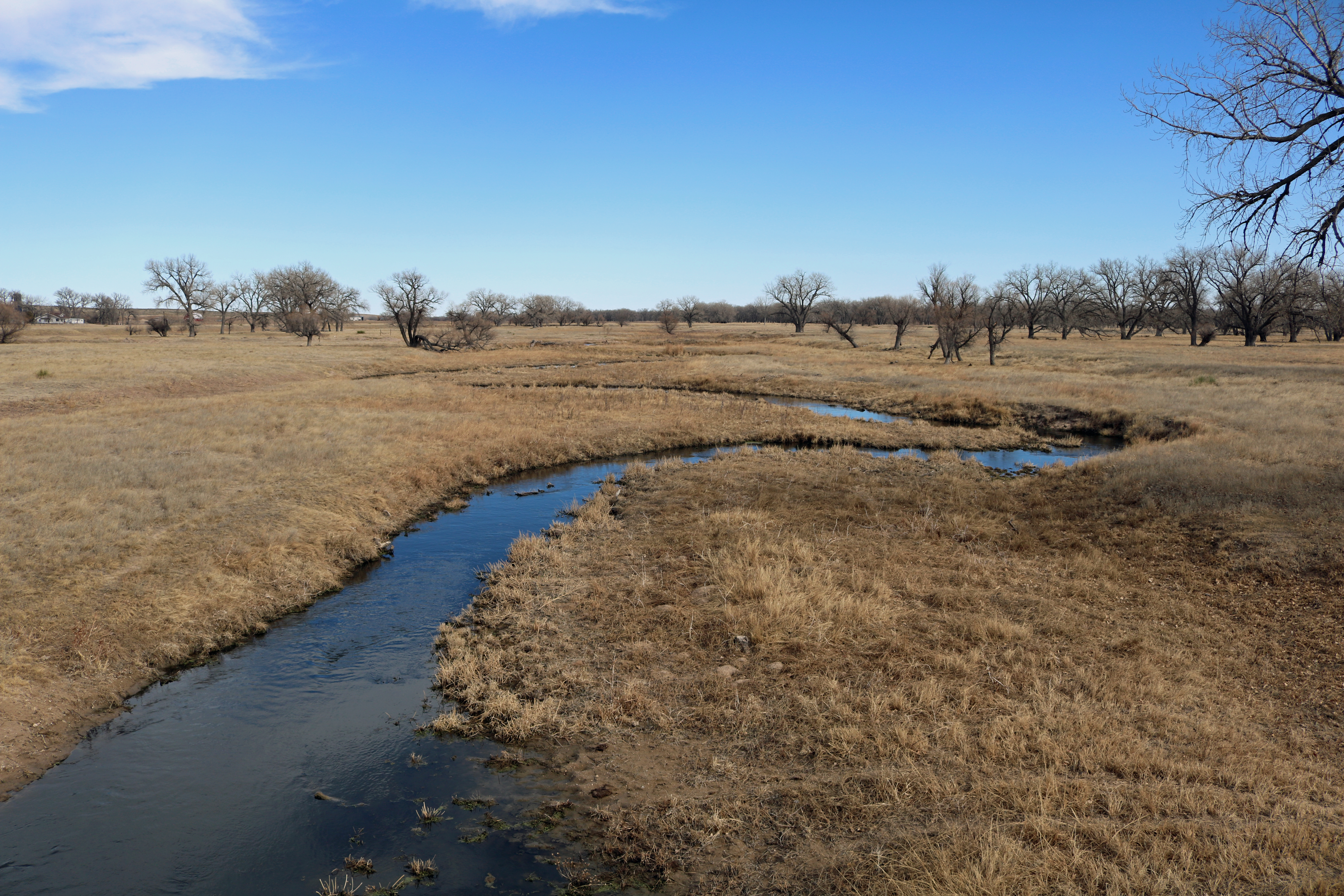
- The river in Hale, Colorado.

Location
- Country: United States
- State: Colorado, Kansas, Nebraska

Physical characteristics
- Source
  - location: Lincoln County, Colorado
  - coordinates: 39°12′53″N 103°20′14″W
  - elevation: 5,384 ft (1,641 m)
- Mouth: Republican River
  - location: Benkelman, Nebraska
  - coordinates: 40°02′30″N 101°31′17″W
  - elevation: 2,969 ft (905 m)
- Length: 171 mi (275 km)
- Basin size: 2,778 mi^{2} (7,190 km^{2})
- Discharge
  - location: USGS 06827500 near Benkelman, NE
  - average: 35.1 cu ft/s (0.99 m^{3}/s)
  - minimum: 0 cu ft/s (0 m^{3}/s)
  - maximum: 6,220 cu ft/s (176 m^{3}/s)

Basin features
- Watersheds: South Fork Republican- Republican-Kansas-Missouri- Mississippi

The South Fork Republican River is a river that arises in Lincoln County, Colorado, United States, and flows east-northeastward for about 171 miles (275 km) through Kit Carson and Yuma Counties, Colorado, and Cheyenne County, Kansas, to a confluence with the Republican River in Dundy County, Nebraska. Bonny Reservoir is located on the South Fork Republican River in Yuma County, Colorado.

The South Fork Republican River drains an area of 2,778 square miles (7,190 km^{2}), including 2,106 square miles (5,450 km^{2}), or 75.8%, in eastern Colorado, 667 square miles (1,730 km^{2}), or 24.0%, in northwestern Kansas, and 6 square miles (16 km^{2}), or 0.2%, in southwestern Nebraska.

Use of water from the South Fork Republican River is governed by the Republican River Compact, a water agreement among the U.S. states of Colorado, Kansas and Nebraska signed on December 31, 1942.

== See also ==
- List of rivers in Colorado
- List of rivers in Kansas
- List of rivers in Nebraska
- Colorado drainage basins
