= Max, Nebraska =

Census-designated place in Dundy County, Nebraska, United States

- Census-designated place
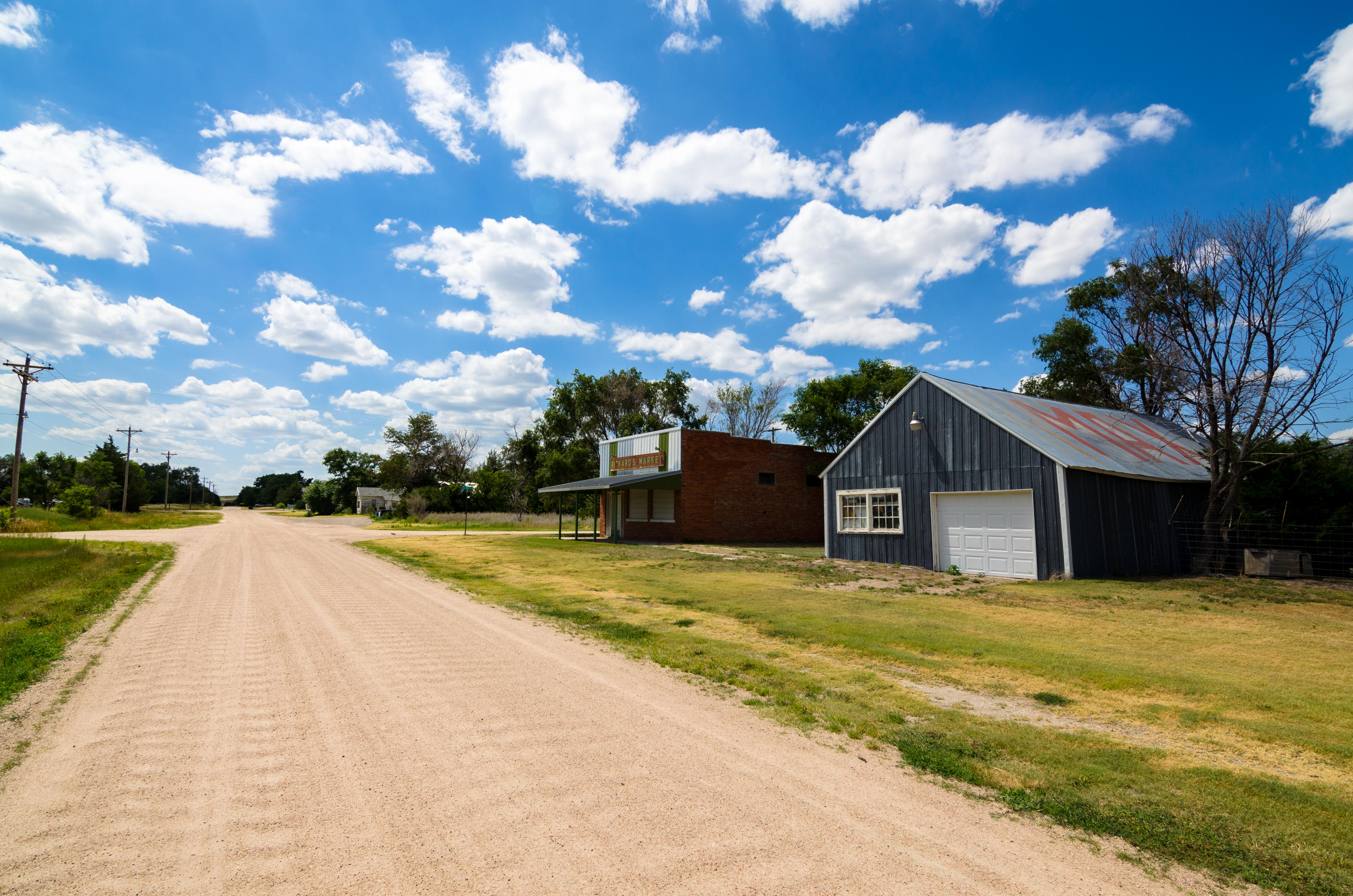
- Main Street of Max (2017)

- Location within the state of Nebraska Location within the United States
- Coordinates: 40°06′52″N 101°24′16″W
- Country: United States
- State: Nebraska
- County: Dundy

Area
  - Total: 0.22 sq mi (0.57 km^{2})
  - Land: 0.22 sq mi (0.57 km^{2})
  - Water: 0 sq mi (0.00 km^{2})
- Elevation: 2,907 ft (886 m)

Population (2020)
  - Total: 50
  - Density: 226.4/sq mi (87.42/km^{2})
- Time zone: UTC-7 (Mountain (MST))
  - Summer (DST): UTC-6 (MDT)
- ZIP code: 69037
- FIPS code: 31-31150
- GNIS feature ID: 2583891

Max is a census-designated place in Dundy County, Nebraska, United States. Max's population as of 2020 was 50.

== Description ==
Max is located in eastern Dundy County, along U.S. Route 34 (US 34) in the valley of the Republican River. Via US 34 it is 9 miles (14 km) southwest to Benkelman, the county seat, and 10 miles (16 km) east to Stratton. Its elevation is 2,900 feet (880 m) above sea level.

== History ==
The first settlement at Max was made in 1880. The community named itself in honor of the postmaster, Max Monivisin.

== Demographics ==
Historical population
Census	Pop.	Note	%±
2020	50		—
U.S. Decennial Census
