= List of drainage basins in Colorado =

The location of the State of Colorado in the United States of America.

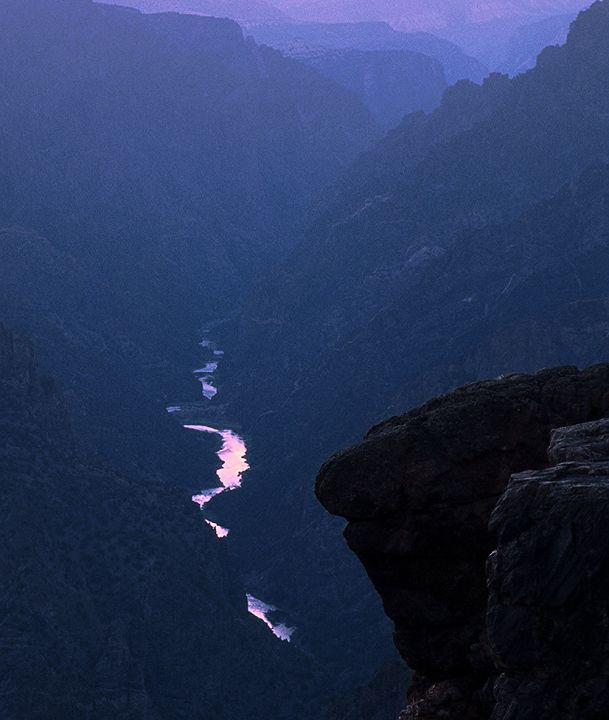
The Gunnison River in the Black Canyon.

This is a list of drainage basins in the U.S. State of Colorado.

Colorado encompasses the headwaters of several important rivers. The state is divided into two major hydrographic regions by the Continental Divide of the Americas. East of the Continental Divide, surface waters flow to the Gulf of Mexico, either via the Rio Grande or via one of several rivers (the South Platte River, the North Platte River, the Republican River, the Arkansas River, the Cimarron River, or the Canadian River) which eventually feed the Mississippi River along the way. West of the Continental Divide, surface waters flow via the Green River, the upper Colorado River (Note: The Colorado River did not officially flow through the State of Colorado until July 25, 1921. Prior to that date, the origin of the Colorado River was officially the confluence of the Grand and Green rivers at 38.1892°N 109.8857°W in what is now Canyonlands National Park of Utah. In 1921, U.S. Representative Edward T. Taylor of Colorado petitioned the Congressional Committee on Interstate and Foreign Commerce to rename the Grand River as the Colorado River. On July 25, 1921, President Warren G. Harding signed House Joint Resolution 32 - To change the name of the Grand River in Colorado and Utah to the Colorado River, over the objections of representatives from Wyoming, Utah, and the United States Geological Survey, who noted that the Green River was longer and had a larger drainage basin, although the Grand River often contributed a greater flow of water.) (formerly the Grand River), or the San Juan River into the Colorado River and on to the Gulf of California.

Colorado also has three significant endorheic basins: the San Luis Closed Basin in the San Luis Valley, and the Bear Creek Basin and the White Woman Basin spanning the Colorado-Kansas border north and south of the Arkansas River.

== List of major drainage basins ==
Major Drainage Basins of the State of Colorado
Basin	Outlet	Total Area	In-State Area	% In-State
Colorado River (Note: The summit of Uncompahgre Peak at 14,321 feet (4365.0 m) is the highest point in the drainage basins of the Cimarron River, the Gunnison River, the former Grand River, the Colorado River, and the Gulf of California.)	Gulf of California	703,132 km^{2} 271,481 mi^{2}	100,195 km^{2} 38,686 mi^{2}	14.2%
Arkansas River (Note: The summit of Mount Elbert at 14,440 feet (4401.2 m) is the highest point in the drainage basins of the Arkansas River and the Mississippi River.)	Mississippi River	478,501 km^{2} 184,750 mi^{2}	70,022 km^{2} 27,036 mi^{2}	14.6%
Rio Grande (Rio Bravo del Norte) (Note: The summit of Blanca Peak at 14,351 feet (4374 m) is the highest point in the drainage basin of the Rio Grande (Rio Bravo del Norte).)	Gulf of Mexico	457,275 km^{2} 176,555 mi^{2}	12,070 km^{2} 4,660 mi^{2}	2.6%
Canadian River	Arkansas River	122,701 km^{2} 47,375 mi^{2}	154 km^{2} 59 mi^{2}	0.1%
Green River (Note: The headwaters of the Green River are located in the Wind River Mountains of the State of Wyoming.)	Colorado River	115,903 km^{2} 44,750 mi^{2}	27,340 km^{2} 10,556 mi^{2}	23.6%
North Platte River (Note: The summit of Clark Peak at 12,960 feet (3950 m) is the highest point in the drainage basins of the Laramie River and the North Platte River.)	Platte River	80,755 km^{2} 31,180 mi^{2}	5,129 km^{2} 1,980 mi^{2}	6.4%
upper Colorado River (Grand River)	Colorado River	67,993 km^{2} 26,252 mi^{2}	57,680 km^{2} 22,270 mi^{2}	84.8%
San Juan River	Colorado River	64,560 km^{2} 24,927 mi^{2}	15,175 km^{2} 5,859 mi^{2}	23.5%
South Platte River (Note: The summit of Mount Lincoln at 14,293 feet (4356.5 m) is the highest point in the drainage basins of the South Platte River, the Platte River, and the Missouri River.)	Platte River	62,738 km^{2} 24,223 mi^{2}	48,948 km^{2} 18,899 mi^{2}	78.0%
Smoky Hill River	Kansas River	51,783 km^{2} 19,994 mi^{2}	2,493 km^{2} 963 mi^{2}	4.8%
Cimarron River (Note: The headwaters of the Cimarron River are located in Union County, New Mexico, a short distance south of the Colorado border.)	Arkansas River	44,890 km^{2} 17,332 mi^{2}	5,481 km^{2} 2,116 mi^{2}	12.2%
Yampa River	Green River	21,506 km^{2} 8,304 mi^{2}	15,289 km^{2} 5,903 mi^{2}	71.1%
Gunnison River (Note: The Gunnison River Basin is the most extensive river basin exclusively within the State of Colorado.)	upper Colorado River (Grand River)	20,851 km^{2} 8,051 mi^{2}	20,851 km^{2} 8,051 mi^{2}	100%
North Fork Republican River	Republican River	13,172 km^{2} 5,086 mi^{2}	11,522 km^{2} 4,449 mi^{2}	87.5%
White River	Green River	12,989 km^{2} 5,015 mi^{2}	9,796 km^{2} 3,782 mi^{2}	75.4%
Dolores River	upper Colorado River (Grand River)	11,998 km^{2} 4,633 mi^{2}	10,619 km^{2} 4,100 mi^{2}	88.5%
Laramie River	North Platte River	11,961 km^{2} 4,618 mi^{2}	989 km^{2} 382 mi^{2}	8.3%
Little Snake River	Yampa River	10,629 km^{2} 4,104 mi^{2}	4,412 km^{2} 1,704 mi^{2}	41.5%
Purgatoire River (Note: The summit of Culebra Peak at 14,053 feet (4283 m) is the highest point in the drainage basin of the Purgatoire River.)	Arkansas River	8,923 km^{2} 3,445 mi^{2}	8,601 km^{2} 3,321 mi^{2}	96.4%
Lodgepole Creek	South Platte River	8,374 km^{2} 3,233 mi^{2}	496 km^{2} 191 mi^{2}	5.9%
Rio Chama	Rio Grande	8,204 km^{2} 3,168 mi^{2}	238 km^{2} 92 mi^{2}	2.9%
San Luis Closed Basin (Note: The San Luis Closed Basin is the most extensive endorheic basin in the State of Colorado.) (Note: The summit of Crestone Peak at 14,300 feet (4359 m) is the highest point in the San Luis Closed Basin.)	endorheic basin	7,638 km^{2} 2,949 mi^{2}	7,638 km^{2} 2,949 mi^{2}	100%
Frenchman Creek	Republican River	7,398 km^{2} 2,856 mi^{2}	2,539 km^{2} 980 mi^{2}	34.3%
South Fork Republican River	Republican River	7,195 km^{2} 2,778 mi^{2}	5,454 km^{2} 2,106 mi^{2}	75.8%
San Luis Creek	San Luis Closed Basin	7,000 km^{2} 2,703 mi^{2}	7,000 km^{2} 2,703 mi^{2}	100%
Cache la Poudre River (Note: The summit of Hagues Peak at 13,573 feet (4137 m) is the highest point in the drainage basins of the Cache la Poudre River and the Big Thompson River.)	South Platte River	4,959 km^{2} 1,915 mi^{2}	4,587 km^{2} 1,771 mi^{2}	92.5%
Bear Creek Basin	endorheic basin	4,896 km^{2} 1,890 mi^{2}	2,521 km^{2} 973 mi^{2}	51.5%
Huerfano River (Note: The summit of West Spanish Peak at 13,631 feet (4155 m) is the highest point in the drainage basins of the Huerfano River and Apishapa River.)	Arkansas River	4,840 km^{2} 1,869 mi^{2}	4,840 km^{2} 1,869 mi^{2}	100%
Big Sandy Creek	Arkansas River	4,825 km^{2} 1,863 mi^{2}	4,825 km^{2} 1,863 mi^{2}	100%
Bear Creek	Bear Creek Basin	4,500 km^{2} 1,737 mi^{2}	2,500 km^{2} 965 mi^{2}	55.6%
North Fork Cimarron River	Cimarron River	4,462 km^{2} 1,723 mi^{2}	2,225 km^{2} 859 mi^{2}	49.9%
Arikaree River (Note: The point at which the Arikaree River flows out of the Colorado and into Kansas is the lowest point in the State of Colorado at 3317 feet (1011 m).)	North Fork Republican River	4,429 km^{2} 1,710 mi^{2}	4,265 km^{2} 1,647 mi^{2}	96.3%
San Miguel River	Dolores River	4,060 km^{2} 1,567 mi^{2}	4,060 km^{2} 1,567 mi^{2}	100%
Stinking Water Creek	Frenchman Creek	3,862 km^{2} 1,491 mi^{2}	966 km^{2} 373 mi^{2}	25.0%
Roaring Fork River (Note: The summit of Castle Peak at 14,279 feet (4352.2 m) is the highest point in the drainage basins of the Roaring Fork River and the Taylor River.)	upper Colorado River (Grand River)	3,766 km^{2} 1,454 mi^{2}	3,766 km^{2} 1,454 mi^{2}	100%
Crow Creek	South Platte River	3,717 km^{2} 1,435 mi^{2}	2,201 km^{2} 850 mi^{2}	59.2%
Horse Creek	Arkansas River	3,680 km^{2} 1,421 mi^{2}	3,680 km^{2} 1,421 mi^{2}	100%
Ladder Creek	Smoky Hill River	3,645 km^{2} 1,407 mi^{2}	663 km^{2} 256 mi^{2}	18.2%
Bijou Creek	South Platte River	3,612 km^{2} 1,395 mi^{2}	3,612 km^{2} 1,395 mi^{2}	100%
White Woman Basin	endorheic basin	3,577 km^{2} 1,381 mi^{2}	908 km^{2} 351 mi^{2}	25.4%
Rush Creek	Arkansas River	3,570 km^{2} 1,378 mi^{2}	3,570 km^{2} 1,378 mi^{2}	100%
Animas River	San Juan River	3,562 km^{2} 1,375 mi^{2}	2,971 km^{2} 1,147 mi^{2}	83.4%
Saguache Creek	San Luis Creek	3,482 km^{2} 1,345 mi^{2}	3,482 km^{2} 1,345 mi^{2}	100%
Montezuma Creek	San Juan River	3,044 km^{2} 1,175 mi^{2}	983 km^{2} 380 mi^{2}	32.3%
White Woman Creek	White Woman Basin	3,000 km^{2} 1,158 mi^{2}	800 km^{2} 309 mi^{2}	26.7%
Beaver Creek	South Platte River	2,939 km^{2} 1,135 mi^{2}	2,939 km^{2} 1,135 mi^{2}	100%
Uncompahgre River	Gunnison River	2,921 km^{2} 1,128 mi^{2}	2,921 km^{2} 1,128 mi^{2}	100%
Tomichi Creek	Gunnison River	2,874 km^{2} 1,109 mi^{2}	2,874 km^{2} 1,109 mi^{2}	100%
Apishapa River	Arkansas River	2,798 km^{2} 1,080 mi^{2}	2,798 km^{2} 1,080 mi^{2}	100%
Saint Vrain Creek (Note: The summit of Longs Peak at 14,259 feet (4346 m) is the highest point in the drainage basin of Saint Vrain Creek.)	South Platte River	2,572 km^{2} 993 mi^{2}	2,572 km^{2} 993 mi^{2}	100%
Eagle River	upper Colorado River (Grand River)	2,515 km^{2} 971 mi^{2}	2,515 km^{2} 971 mi^{2}	100%
Vermillion Creek	Green River	2,500 km^{2} 965 mi^{2}	1,155 km^{2} 446 mi^{2}	46.2%
North Fork Gunnison River	Gunnison River	2,492 km^{2} 962 mi^{2}	2,492 km^{2} 962 mi^{2}	100%
Fountain Creek (Note: The summit of Pikes Peak at 14,115 feet (4302.31 m) is the highest point in the drainage basin of Fountain Creek.)	Arkansas River	2,418 km^{2} 933 mi^{2}	2,418 km^{2} 933 mi^{2}	100%
Big Thompson River	South Platte River	2,149 km^{2} 830 mi^{2}	2,149 km^{2} 830 mi^{2}	100%
Two Butte Creek	Arkansas River	2,107 km^{2} 814 mi^{2}	2,107 km^{2} 814 mi^{2}	100%
Mancos River	San Juan River	2,099 km^{2} 810 mi^{2}	1,973 km^{2} 762 mi^{2}	94.0%
Conejos River	Rio Grande	2,078 km^{2} 802 mi^{2}	1,471 km^{2} 568 mi^{2}	70.8%
North Fork Smoky Hill River	Smoky Hill River	1,965 km^{2} 759 mi^{2}	947 km^{2} 366 mi^{2}	48.2%
Sidney Draw	South Platte River	1,949 km^{2} 753 mi^{2}	368 km^{2} 142 mi^{2}	18.9%
South Fork Beaver Creek	Beaver Creek	1,939 km^{2} 749 mi^{2}	522 km^{2} 201 mi^{2}	26.9%
Sand Arroyo Creek	North Fork Cimarron River	1,938 km^{2} 748 mi^{2}	1,314 km^{2} 507 mi^{2}	67.8%
Chico Creek	Arkansas River	1,934 km^{2} 747 mi^{2}	1,934 km^{2} 747 mi^{2}	100%
Kiowa Creek	South Platte River	1,888 km^{2} 729 mi^{2}	1,888 km^{2} 729 mi^{2}	100%
Pawnee Creek	South Platte River	1,875 km^{2} 724 mi^{2}	1,875 km^{2} 724 mi^{2}	100%
McElmo Creek	San Juan River	1,842 km^{2} 711 mi^{2}	1,654 km^{2} 639 mi^{2}	89.8%
Blue River (Note: The summit of Grays Peak at 14,278 feet (4352 m) is the highest point on the Continental Divide in North America and the drainage basins of the Blue River and Clear Creek.)	upper Colorado River (Grand River)	1,770 km^{2} 683 mi^{2}	1,770 km^{2} 683 mi^{2}	100%
Piedra River	San Juan River	1,770 km^{2} 683 mi^{2}	1,770 km^{2} 683 mi^{2}	100%
Piceance Creek	White River	1,630 km^{2} 629 mi^{2}	1,630 km^{2} 629 mi^{2}	100%
Little Beaver Creek	Beaver Creek	1,602 km^{2} 619 mi^{2}	210 km^{2} 81 mi^{2}	13.1%
Clear Creek	South Platte River	1,497 km^{2} 578 mi^{2}	1,497 km^{2} 578 mi^{2}	100%
Taylor River	Gunnison River	1,258 km^{2} 486 mi^{2}	1,258 km^{2} 486 mi^{2}	100%
Boulder Creek	Saint Vrain Creek	1,160 km^{2} 448 mi^{2}	1,160 km^{2} 448 mi^{2}	100%
Cherry Creek	South Platte River	1,050 km^{2} 405 mi^{2}	1,050 km^{2} 405 mi^{2}	100%

== See also ==
- Surface-water hydrology
- Bibliography of Colorado
- Geography of Colorado
- History of Colorado
- Index of Colorado-related articles
- List of Colorado-related lists
- Outline of Colorado
