= Nebraska Highway 61 =

State highway in Nebraska, U.S.

State Highway 61

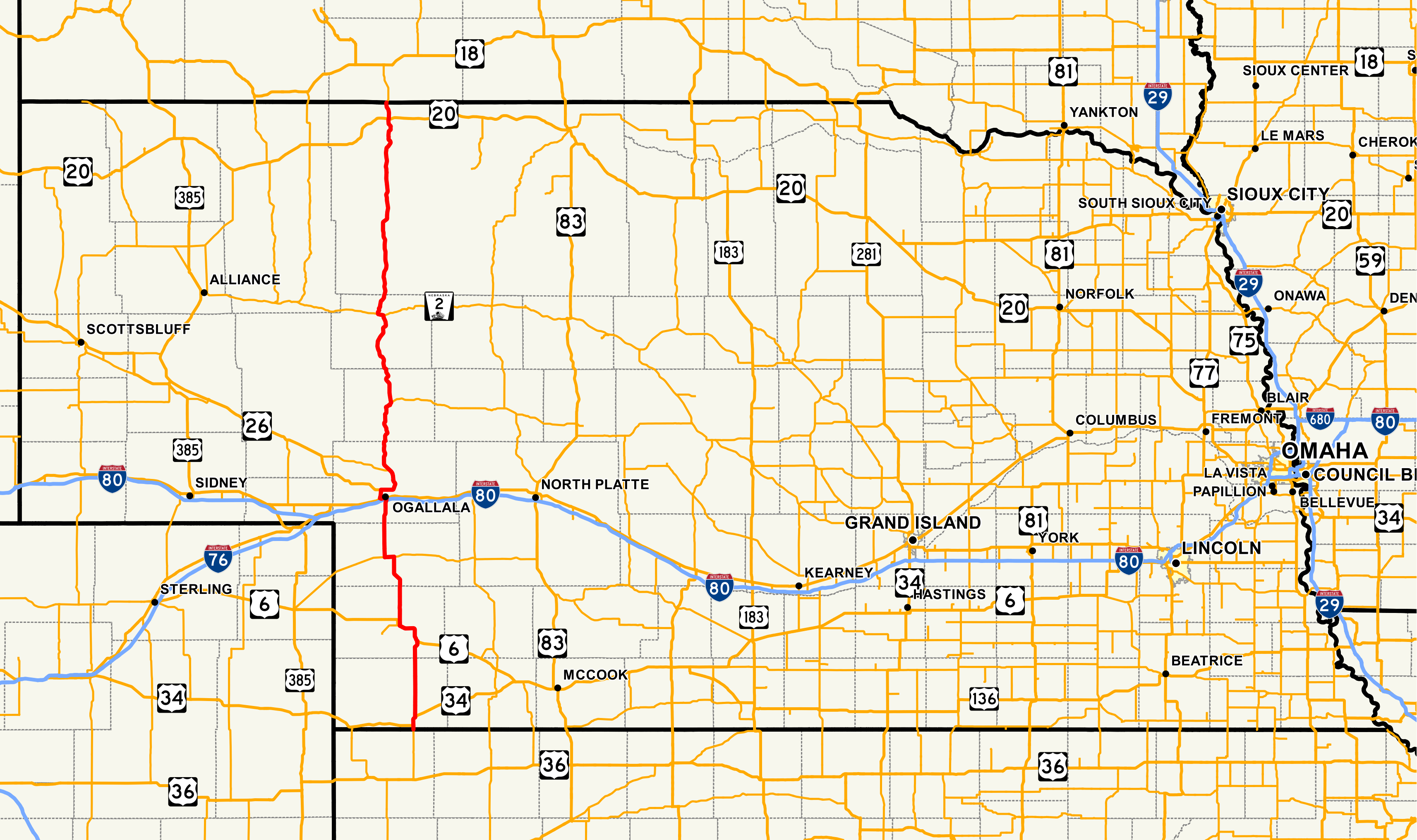
- Nebraska Highway 61 highlighted in red

Route information
- Maintained by NDOT
- Length: 234.82 mi (377.91 km)
- Existed: 1926–present

Major junctions
- South end: K-161 south of Benkelman
- US 34 in Benkelman; US 6 from Enders to Imperial; N-23 east of Grant; I-80 / US 26 / US 30 in Ogallala; N-92 from Lemoyne to Arthur; N-2 east of Hyannis; US 20 in Merriman
- North end: SD 73 north of Merriman

Location
- Country: United States
- State: Nebraska
- Counties: Dundy, Chase, Perkins, Keith, Arthur, Grant, Cherry

Highway system
- Nebraska State Highway System; Interstate; US; State; Link; Spur; State Spurs; Recreation
← N-59	→ N-62

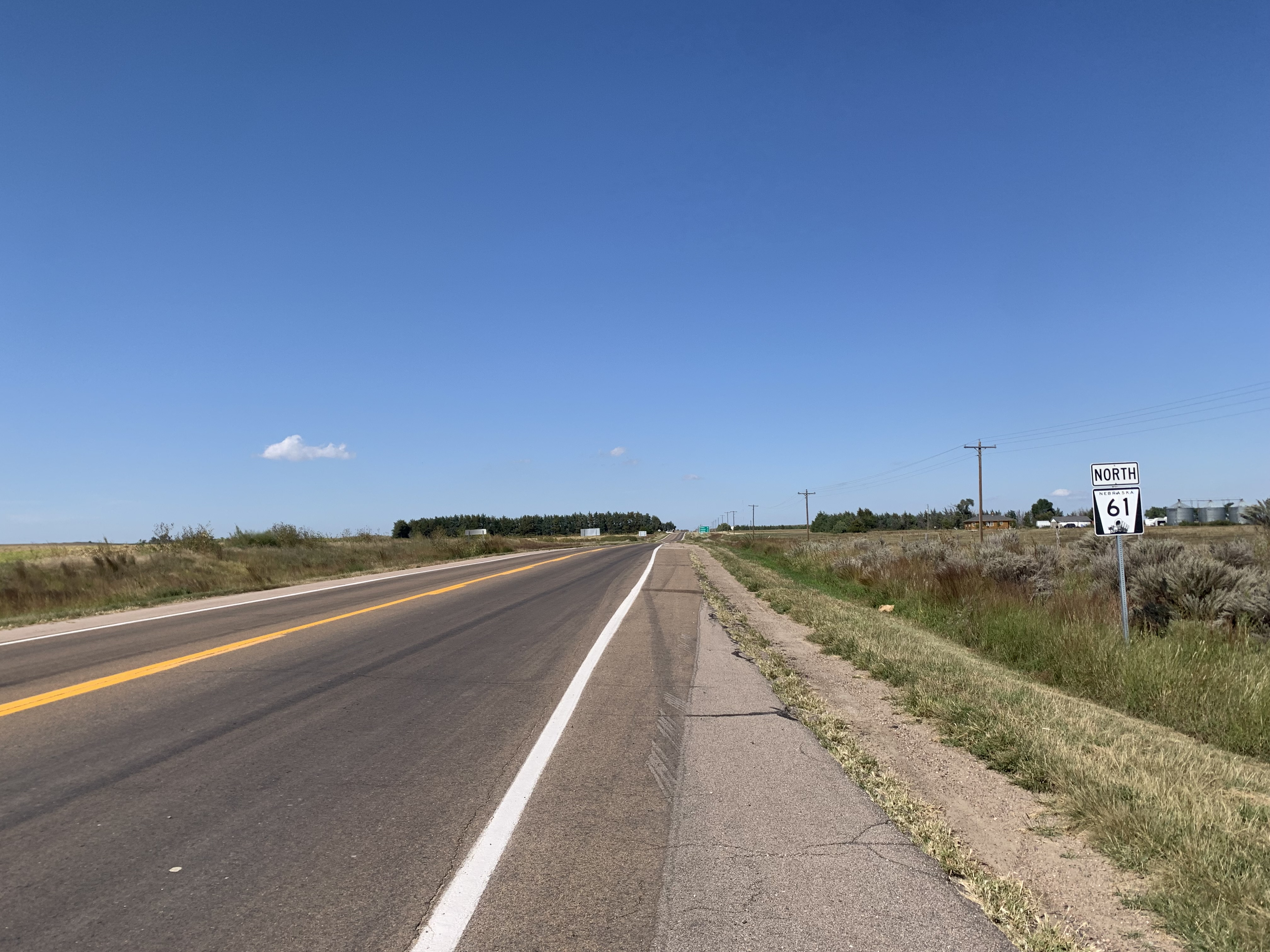
Nebraska Highway 61 in Dundy County, Nebraska

Nebraska Highway 61 (N-61) is a 234.82-mile (377.91 km) state highway in western Nebraska, United States. The southern terminus of N-61 is at the Kansas border south of Benkelman, where the highway continues south as K-161. The northern terminus is at the South Dakota border north of Merriman, where the highway continues north as South Dakota Highway 73.

== Route description ==
Nebraska Highway 61 begins at the Kansas border south of Benkelman. It goes north through farmland for one mile (1.6 km), then intersects U.S. Highway 34, with which it overlaps through Benkelman. It goes north from Benkelman to Enders Reservoir State Recreation Area, where it intersects U.S. Highway 6. They overlap north, then west into Imperial. At Imperial, Highway 61 turns north and continues north until an intersection with Nebraska Highway 23, where Highway 61 and Highway 23 turn west to go to Grant. At Grant, Highway 61 goes north and continues north until Interstate 80 at Ogallala. At I-80, an overlap with U.S. Highway 26 begins and they go north across the South Platte River and intersect U.S. Highway 30.

Nebraska Highway 61, U.S. 26 and U.S. 30 then go west out of Ogallala, then Highway 61 and U.S. 26 turn north. Three miles later, U.S. 26 goes west while Highway 61 goes east. Highway 61 then turns north to cross the North Platte River via Kingsley Dam at the eastern end of Lake McConaughy. It then intersects Nebraska Highway 92 and the two highways overlap as they enter the Sand Hills until Arthur. After Arthur, Highway 61 goes north until Nebraska Highway 2. They overlap going west into Hyannis, then Highway 61 continues north until Merriman. At Merriman, Highway 61 intersects U.S. Highway 20 and overlap in town. Highway 61 continues north from Merriman past the Bowring Ranch State Historical Park and ends at the South Dakota border.

== Major intersections ==
County	Location	mi	km	Destinations	Notes
Dundy		0.00	0.00	K-161 south – Bird City, KS	Continuation into Kansas
Dundy		1.32	2.12	US 34 west – Haigler	South end of US 34 overlap
Dundy	Benkelman	4.30	6.92	US 34 east – Stratton, McCook	North end of US 34 overlap
Chase	Enders	30.35	48.84	US 6 east – Wauneta, McCook	South end of US 6 overlap
Chase	Imperial	39.92	64.25	US 6 west – Holyoke, CO	North end of US 6 overlap
Perkins	Grant	63.80	102.68	N-23 east – Madrid	South end of N-23 overlap
Perkins	Grant	66.89	107.65	N-23 west (A Street) – Venango	North end of N-23 overlap
Keith	Ogallala	86.12	138.60	US 26 begin / I-80 – North Platte, Sidney	South end of US 26 overlap, I-80 exit 126
Keith	Ogallala	86.90	139.85	US 30 east (1st Street)	South end of US 30 overlap
Keith	Ogallala	88.89	143.05	US 30 west (Lincoln Highway) – Sidney	North end of US 30 overlap
Keith	Ogallala	92.01	148.08	US 26 west – Scottsbluff	North end of US 26 overlap
Keith	Lemoyne	103.23	166.13	N-92 west – Scottsbluff	South end of N-92 overlap
Arthur	Arthur	128.68	207.09	N-92 east – Tryon	North end of N-92 overlap
Grant	Hyannis	160.58	258.43	N-2 east – Mullen	South end of N-2 overlap
Grant	Hyannis	162.29	261.18	N-2 west (Railroad Street) – Alliance	North end of N-2 overlap
Cherry	Merriman	229.26	368.96	US 20 west – Gordon, Chadron	South end of US 20 overlap
Cherry	Merriman	229.29	369.01	US 20 east – Valentine	North end of US 20 overlap
Cherry		234.82	377.91	SD 73 north – Martin, SD	Continuation into South Dakota
1.000 mi = 1.609 km; 1.000 km = 0.621 mi: Concurrency terminus

== See also ==
- List of state highways in Nebraska
