= K-161 (Kansas highway) =

State highway in Kansas, U.S.

K-161
- K-161 highlighted in red

Route information
- Maintained by KDOT
- Length: 17 mi (27 km)
- Existed: November 24, 1954–present
- Tourist routes: Ancient Indian Traders Trail

Major junctions
- South end: US-36 in Bird City
- North end: N-61 at the Nebraska state line south of Benkelman

Location
- Country: United States
- State: Kansas
- Counties: Cheyenne

Highway system
- Kansas State Highway System; Interstate; US; State; Spurs
← US-160	→ K-163

K-161 is a 17-mile-long (27 km) north–south state highway located entirely within Cheyenne County in the state of Kansas. Its southern terminus is at U.S. Route 36 (US-36) in Bird City and the northern terminus is a continuation as Nebraska Highway 61 (N-61) at the Nebraska border. The road travels through rural land and is a two-lane road its entire length. The entire length of K-161 is designated as the Ancient Indian Traders Trail.

K-161 became a state highway on November 24, 1954, as Cheyenne County had brought the roadway up to state highway standards. The route has not been changed since it was established. K-161 was designated as the Ancient Indian Traders Trail in 2014.

== Route description ==
K-161's southern terminus is at US-36 in the northwest part of Bird City. The highway continues north for 182 feet (55 m) and has and at-grade crossing with a Nebraska Kansas Colorado Railway track before exiting the city. The highway continues north through flat rural farmland for roughly 6.3 miles (10.1 km) then transitions to rolling hills covered with a mix of grasslands and exposed soils. The highway continues north and after another 0.7 miles (1.1 km) intersects County Road U before crossing Wolfe Canyon. K-161 continues north for about 1.9 miles (3.1 km) then curves north-northwest and crosses Wolfe Canyon again. The highway curves back north and then after about 0.5 miles (0.80 km) veers to the north-northeast. The road transitions back to a north direction 0.2 miles (320 m) later. The roadway continues for approximately 6.2 miles (10.0 km) before intersecting County Road Dd. K-161 continues north through flat farmlands for another one mile (1.6 km) then crosses into Nebraska, where the road becomes Nebraska Highway 61 (N-61). The entire length of K-161 is designated as the Ancient Indian Traders Trail, which was designated due to it being near the route of a trail historically used as a hunting, military, and trading route over a long period of time.

The Kansas Department of Transportation (KDOT) tracks the traffic levels on its highways, and in 2019, they determined that on average the traffic varied from 550 vehicles per day near the southern terminus to 650 vehicles per day near the northern terminus. The entire route is paved with partial design bituminous pavement. K-161 is not included or connected to the National Highway System. (Note: The National Highway System is a system of highways important to the nation's defense, economy, and mobility.)

== History ==
K-161 was first approved to become a state highway in a resolution on November 24, 1954, as soon as Cheyenne County had finished constructing the roadway to state highway standards. Cheyenne County soon finished projects to bring the road up to state highway standards and then in a resolution on February 21, 1955, it was established as a state highway. In May 1955, bids were taken to pave the highway, which was previously gravelled. The entire route was paved by 1956. The route has not been changed since it was established.

In 2014, State Representative Cassidy showed support to designate K-161 as the Ancient Indian Traders Trail. K-161 was designated this due to it being near the route of a trail historically used as a hunting, military, and trading route over a long period of time. The cost of making and installing the two signs would be $2,140, along with $1,070 for future maintenance was provided to KDOT. The signs were unveiled at a dedication ceremony in Bird City on September 7, 2014. The designation was officially approved by the Kansas legislature in 2019.

== Major intersections ==
The entire route is in Cheyenne County.

Location	mi	km	Destinations	Notes
Bird City	0.0	0.0	US-36 – Atchison, St. Francis	Southern terminus
Bird City Township	17	27	N-61 north – Benkelman	Continuation into Nebraska
1.000 mi = 1.609 km; 1.000 km = 0.621 mi
