= Parks, Nebraska =

Census-designated place in Dundy County, Nebraska, United States

- Census-designated place
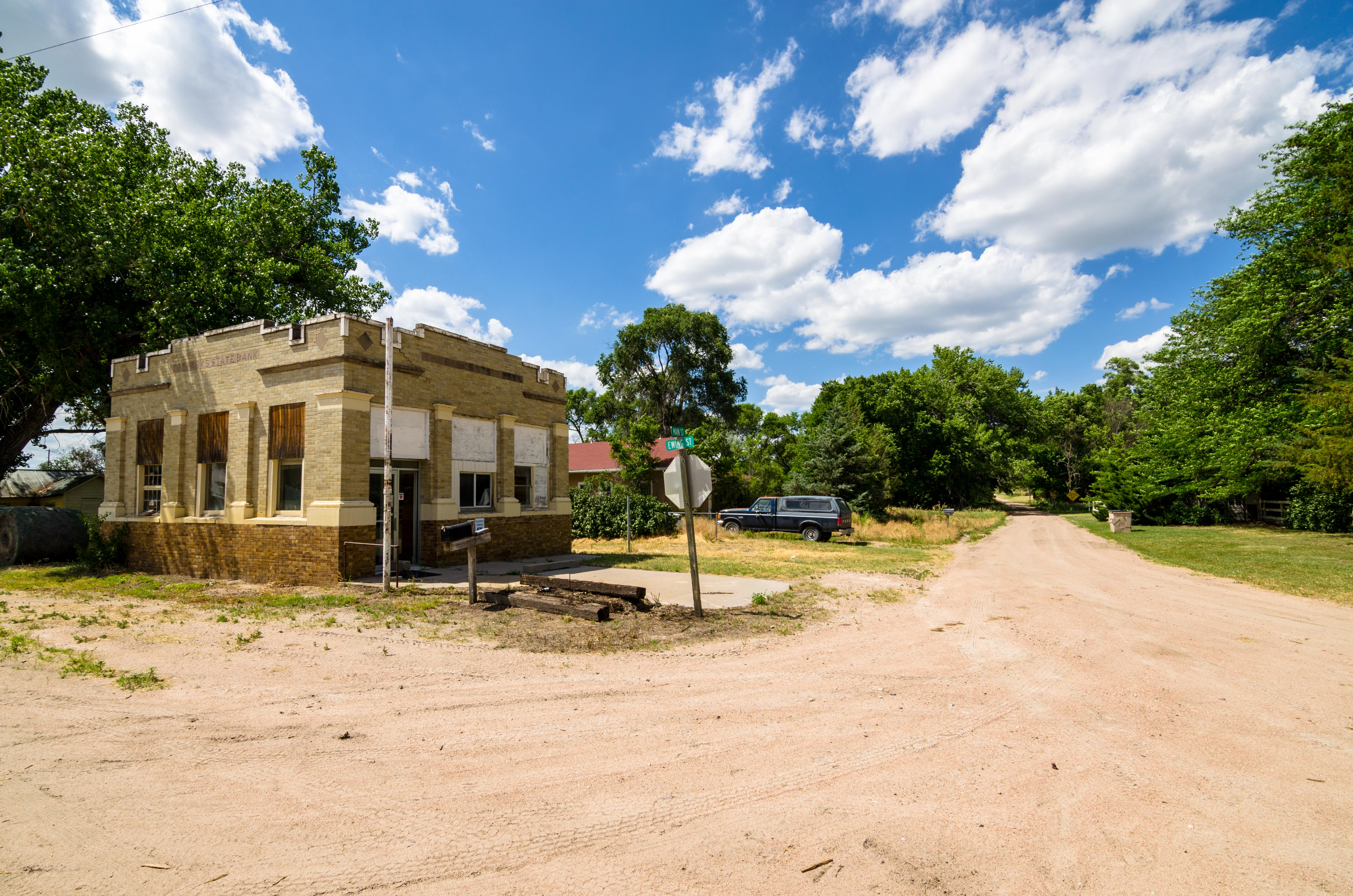
- Main Street in Parks, July 2017

- Location within the state of Nebraska
- Coordinates: 40°02′37″N 101°43′30″W
- Country: United States
- State: Nebraska
- County: Dundy

Area
  - Total: 0.18 sq mi (0.46 km^{2})
  - Land: 0.18 sq mi (0.46 km^{2})
  - Water: 0 sq mi (0.00 km^{2})
- Elevation: 3,104 ft (946 m)

Population (2020)
  - Total: 12
  - Density: 68.2/sq mi (26.33/km^{2})
- Time zone: UTC-7 (Mountain (MST))
  - Summer (DST): UTC-6 (MDT)
- ZIP code: 69041
- FIPS code: 31-38365
- GNIS feature ID: 2583893

Parks is a census-designated place in southern Dundy County, Nebraska, United States. As of the 2020 census, its population was 12.

== Description ==
Parks lies along local roads just north of U.S. Route 34, 12 miles (19 km) west of the city of Benkelman, the county seat of Dundy County. Its elevation is 3,094 feet (943 m) above sea level. Parks is unincorporated, with the ZIP code of 69041.

Parks was named and laid out in 1880–1881 by Frank Parks, who was the surveyor for the railroad that was moving west at the time.

== Demographics ==
Historical population
Census	Pop.	Note	%±
2020	12		—
U.S. Decennial Census

== Notable people ==
- Roger L. Reisher, banker, philanthropist
