= Sanborn, Nebraska =

Extinct hamlet in Nebraska, U.S.

Coordinates: 40°03′13″N 102°01′13″W

Sanborn is an unincorporated community in Dundy County, Nebraska, United States.

== History ==
Sanborn was named for J. E. Sanborn, the original owner of the town site. A post office was established at Sanborn in 1906, and remained in operation until it was discontinued in 1929. Little now remains of the original town.
