= Republican River =

River in Colorado, Kansas, and Nebraska, U.S.

Republican River Fourche des Republiques, Coster Blanches, Ki-ra-ru-tah, Ma'ėhóoheváo'hé'e (chy)
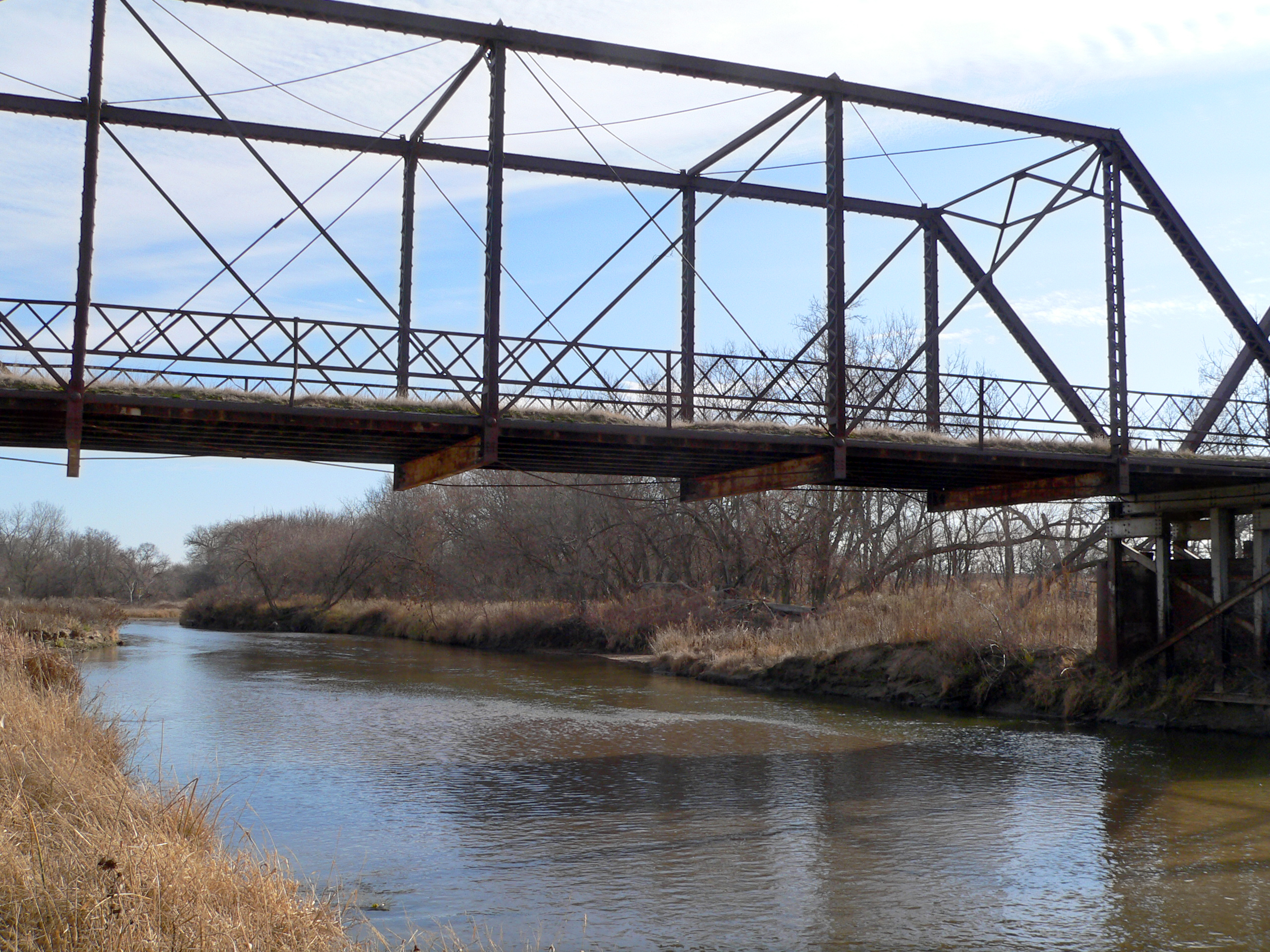
- The Republican River near Riverton, Nebraska

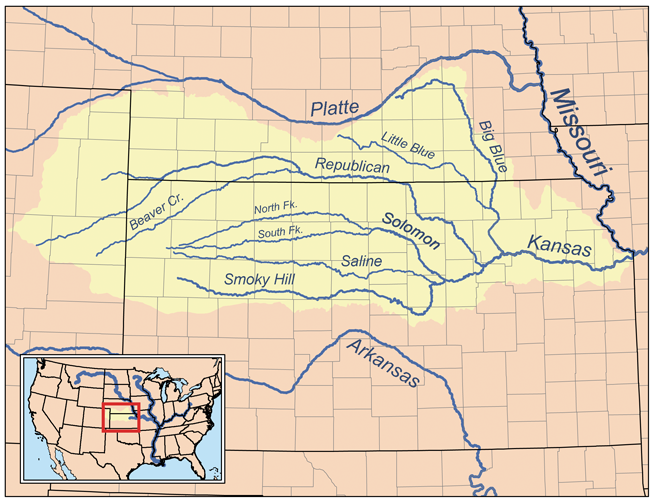
- Map of the Kansas River drainage basin showing the Republican River

Location
- Country: United States
- States: Nebraska, Kansas, Colorado

Physical characteristics
- Source confluence
  - location: Haigler, Nebraska
  - coordinates: 40°01′12″N 101°56′16″W
  - elevation: 3,253 ft (992 m)
- Mouth: Kansas River
  - location: Junction City, Kansas
  - coordinates: 39°03′36″N 96°48′05″W
  - elevation: 1,043 ft (318 m)
- Length: 453 mi (729 km)
- Basin size: 24,900 sq mi (64,000 km^{2})
- Discharge
  - location: Junction City about 3 mi (4.8 km) above the mouth
  - average: 848 cu ft/s (24.0 m^{3}/s)
  - minimum: 3.2 cu ft/s (0.091 m^{3}/s)
  - maximum: 33,300 cu ft/s (940 m^{3}/s)

Basin features
- Tributaries
  - left: North Fork Republican River, Frenchman Creek, Red Willow Creek, Medicine Creek
  - right: Arikaree River, South Fork Republican River, Sappa Creek, Prairie Dog Creek, White Rock Creek
- Watersheds: Republican-Kansas-Missouri-Mississippi

The Republican River is a river in the central Great Plains of North America, rising in the High Plains of eastern Colorado and flowing east 453 miles (729 km) through the U.S. states of Nebraska and Kansas.

== Geography ==
The Republican River is formed by the confluence of the North Fork Republican River and the Arikaree River just north of Haigler in Dundy County, Nebraska. It joins with the South Fork Republican River immediately southeast of Benkelman, Nebraska. All three tributaries originate in the High Plains of northeastern Colorado. From the confluence, the river flows generally eastward along the southern border of Nebraska, passing through Swanson Reservoir and Harlan County Reservoir before curving southward into the Smoky Hills region of Kansas. The Republican River joins the Smoky Hill River at Junction City, Kansas to form the Kansas River.

Some cities along the river are McCook, Nebraska, Clay Center, Kansas, Concordia, Kansas and Junction City, Kansas. Near Concordia is the Republican River Pegram Truss, a bridge that goes over the Republican River that is listed on the National Register of Historic Places.

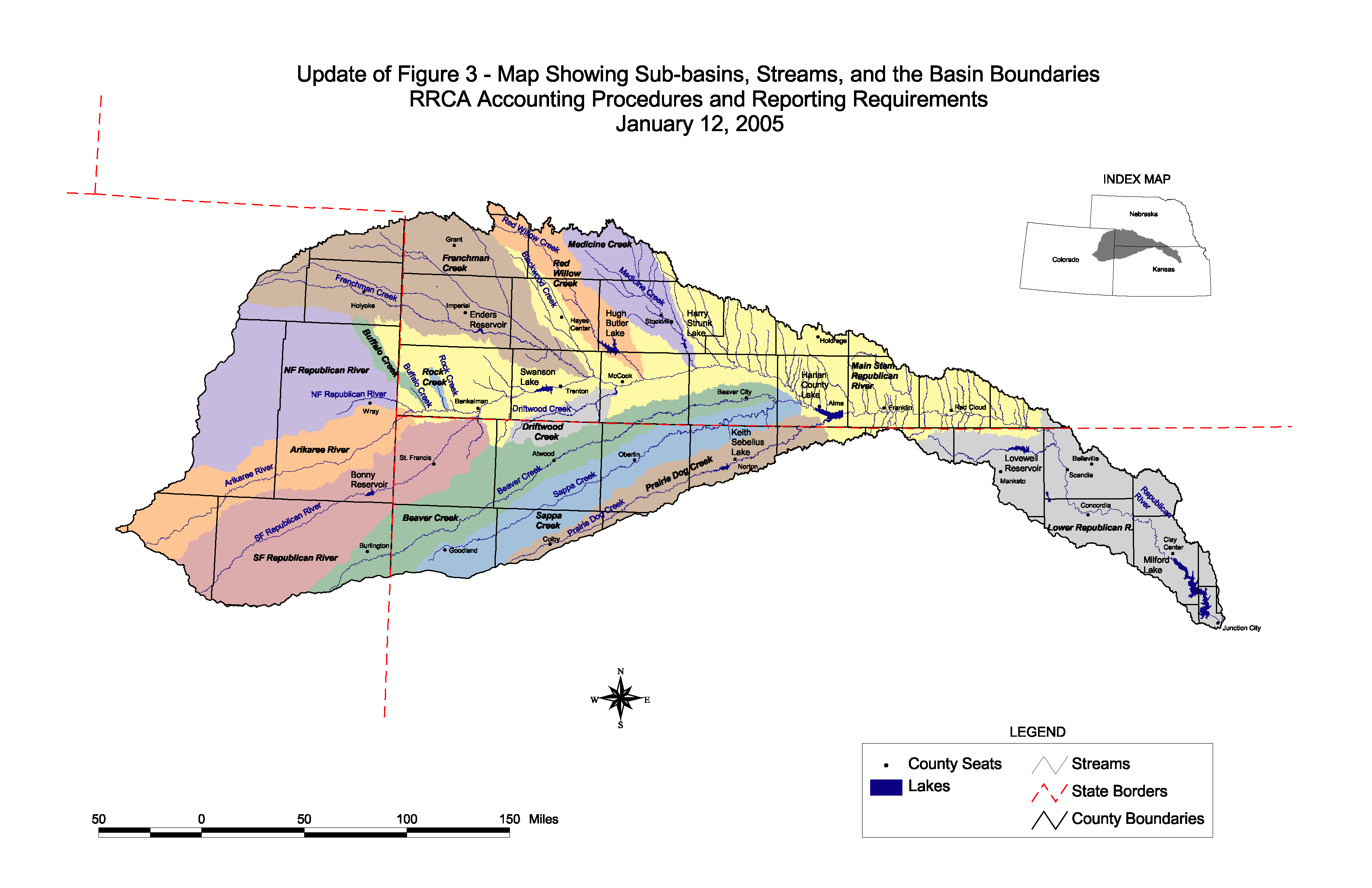
Map of the Republican River, its tributaries, and drainage basin.

== History ==
The river was named after a branch of Pawnee Indians known as "the Republicans".

As early as 1785, the Spanish and French had identified one of the villages of the Pawnee people as aldea de la Republica (little village of the Republic). A French traders' custom was to name rivers for the tribal villages located on their banks. In this way, the north fork of the Kansas River was named Fourche des Republiques or Fork of the Republics.

The Kitkehahkis Pawnee villages farmed corn, beans, and pumpkin in the fertile Republican valley floor but seasonally left to hunt buffalo in the plains to the west and south.

The Kitkehahkis, or Republican Pawnee, occasionally abandoned and relocated various villages along the Republican River. In 1806, first the Spanish and then the Americans journeyed to the large Kitkehahkis village on Republican River, the Pike-Pawnee Village Site then near the present Guide Rock, Nebraska. Both parties were seeking the tribe's assistance in enforcing competing claims to the Louisiana Territory. Leading the much smaller American expedition, Lieutenant Zebulon Pike convinced the Kitkehahkis to accept the American Flag in place of the Spanish.

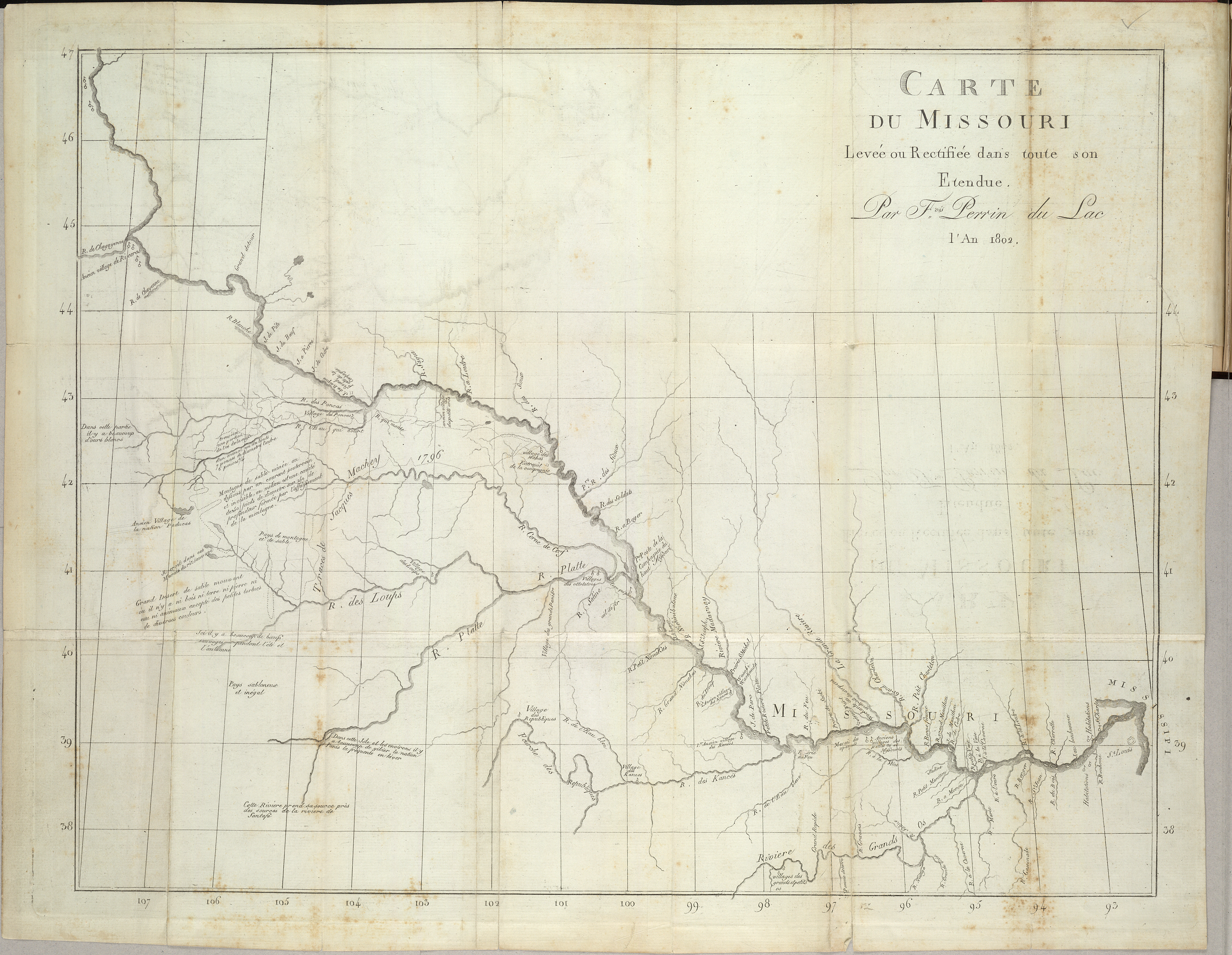
Perrin du Lac’s "Map of the Banks of the Missouri River" (1802), locates the Pawnee Republic (Village des Republic) on the Republican Fork of the Kansas River

In 1853, Fort Riley was established at the junction of the Republican with the Smoky Hill and Kansas Rivers. American settlement of the lower Republican River in began in the 1860s.

Prior to 1864, the Kansas River was publicly navigable under Kansas law. A side-wheel steamboat of 125 tons burden, Financier No. 2, reached the Republican River in 1855 and ascended it some 40 miles. However, in 1864, railroad interests passed a bill through the Kansas Legislature entitled, "An act declaring the Kansas, Republican, Smoky Hill, Solomon, and Big Blue rivers not navigable, and authorizing the bridging of the same." Railroads were thus permitted to bridge or dam the Republican as if it were never declared navigable.

The Kansas Pacific Railway reached the fork of the Republican in 1866, crossing into the Junction City town site. The Junction City and Fort Kearney Railroad was constructed up the valley of the Republican to Clay Center in 1873.

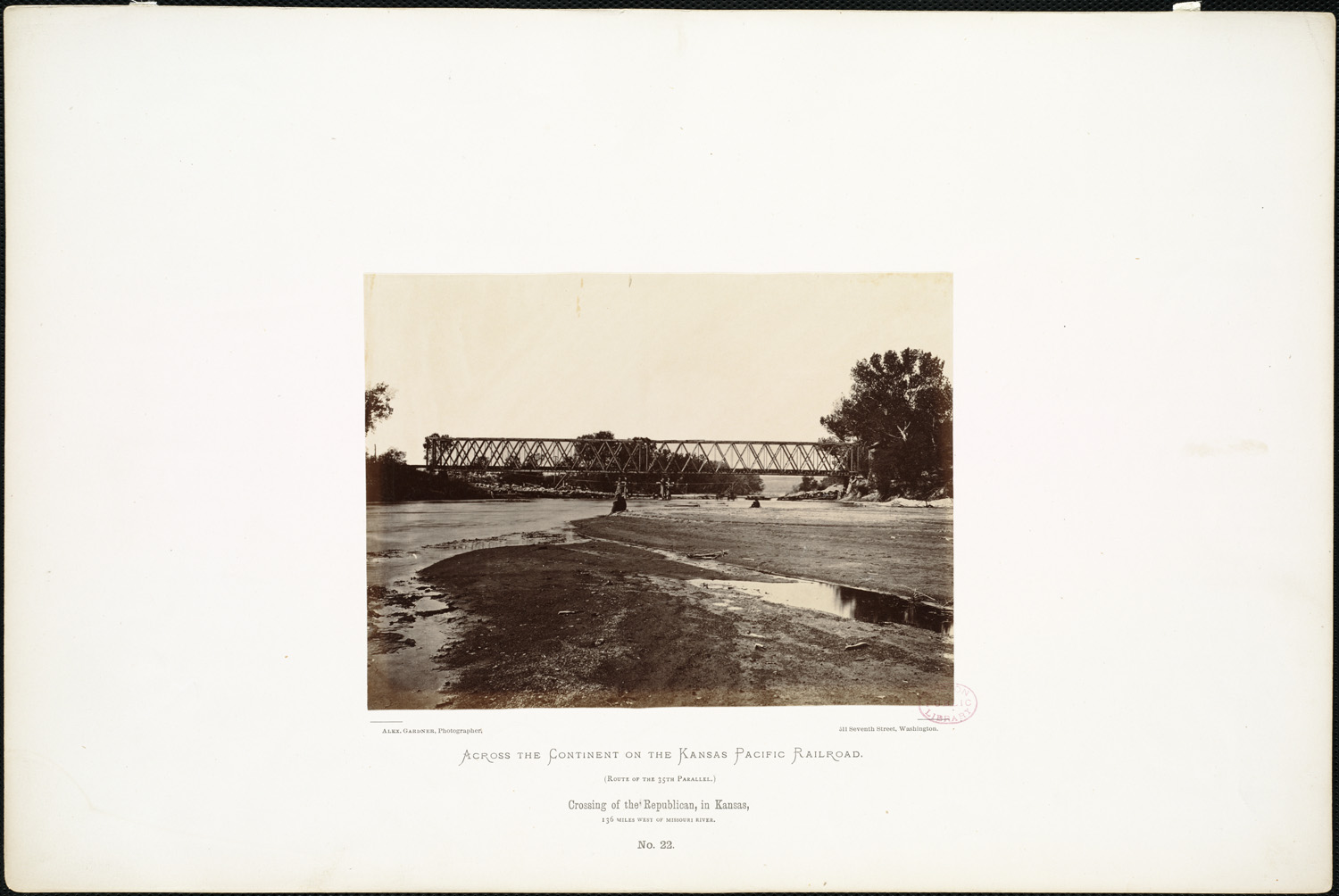
The Kansas Pacific Railway bridge across the Republican River and behind that, a pontoon bridge. [ Alexander Gardner (photographer), 1867] The present Union Pacific Railroad and Custer Road/Grant Road (previously U.S. Route 40) still bridge the Republican River at the same locations. Public access to the Kansas River National Water Trail is between the two bridges.

The 1864 law was repealed in 1913; however, under Kansas Law, public access, whether for transport or recreation, is permitted only on publicly owned rivers. The State of Kansas owns only the Kansas and Arkansas Rivers as well as the portion of the Missouri River adjoining the northeastern corner of the state. As such, the limit of public river access is at the mouth of the Republican River. A public boat access ramp was opened on the mouth of the Republican River in 2009 just upstream of the railroad bridge, providing access to the upper end of the Kansas River National Water Trail, a part of the National Water Trail program.

Milford Lake, the largest artificial lake in Kansas, was completed on the Republican in 1967.

== Republican River Compact ==
Allocation of the water from the Republican River is governed through an agreement called the Republican River Compact, involving the states of Nebraska, Kansas and Colorado, as modified by the settlement of a United States Supreme Court case (Kansas vs. Nebraska and Colorado) involving a water-use dispute under the Compact.

== Major flooding ==
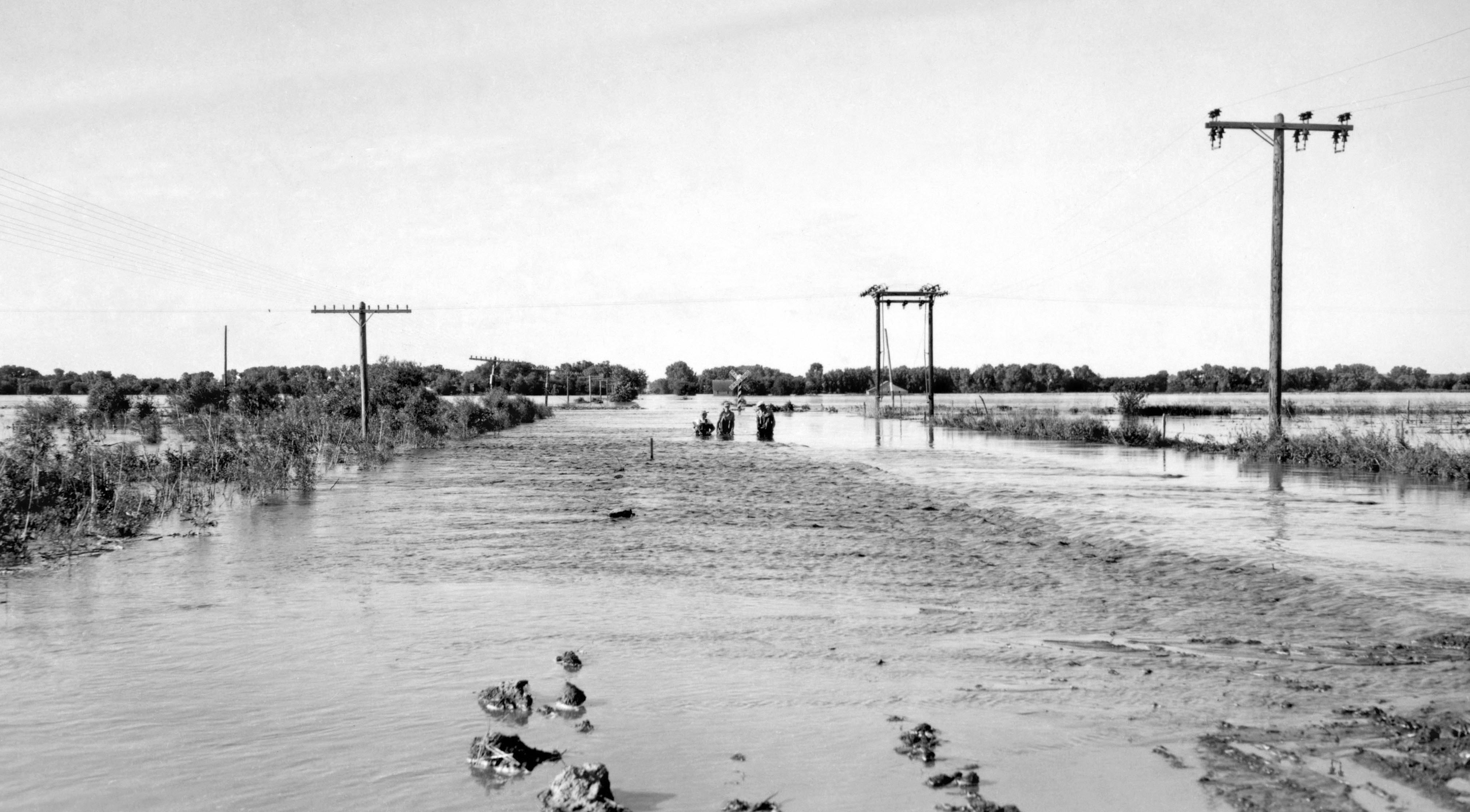
June 24, 1947, flood of the Republican River near Hardy, Nebraska and Webber, Kansas.

=== July 1902 ===
On July 9, 1902, the river flooded near Concordia, Kansas, breaking a dam and re-routing the river by a quarter-mile (about half a kilometer).

=== May/June 1935 ===
The storm of May 31 and June 1, 1935, (called "Nebraska's Deadliest Flood") dumped an average rainfall of 9 inches (230 mm) on the river's watershed. This storm was also unique in that it moved in the same direction as the drainage basin. As a result, the Frenchman, Red Willow, Medicine, Deer, Muddy, and Turkey creeks all reached their flood peaks at the same time as the crest passed on the Republican River.

According to witness accounts, the roar of the water could be heard coming down the Republican Valley 5 miles (8 km) away. Many survivors also reported that there were two crests - the water came up on May 28, then receded slightly, but the second crest on June 1 greatly exceeded the first. At one point, the water rose 6 feet (1.8 m) in 30 minutes and was 10 to 15 feet (3 to 5 m) higher than the previous record crest. One eyewitness said the water level rose in some places at 10 miles per hour or more. Another account states that the Republican rose 10 feet (3 m) in 12 minutes in McCook, destroying the structures in its path. Water was 20 feet (6 m) deep in some places, and the discharge was 280,000 cubic feet per second (7,900 m^{3}/s), more than 320 times the normal flow today.

Estimates show 113 people killed. From 11,400 to 41,500 head of cattle were killed; one report said that carcasses littering the roads made them impassable. A total of 341 miles (549 km) of highway and 307 bridges were destroyed, and 74,500 acres (301 km^{2}) of farmland were inundated.

== See also ==
- List of Kansas rivers
- List of Nebraska rivers
