= Lamont, Nebraska =

Unincorporated community in Nebraska, U.S.

Coordinates: 40°19′15″N 101°52′24″W

Lamont is an unincorporated community in Dundy County, Nebraska, United States.

== History ==
A post office was established at Lamont in 1893, and remained in operation until it was discontinued in 1934. The community is like named for Daniel Scott Lamont, who was Secretary of War under President Grover Cleveland.
