= Roger L. Reisher =

American banker

Roger L. Reisher (July 24, 1928 – September 25, 2013) was an American banker, philanthropist and the first President of FirstBank Holding Co which is the largest banking institution headquartered in Colorado.

He was raised in a sod house in southwest Nebraska and graduated from Parks High School, Parks, Nebraska, in 1945. He went on to graduate with an accounting degree from the [University of Colorado] using the G.I. Bill. He Co-Founded Westland National Bank in 1963 in a house trailer in the parking lot of the Westland Shopping Center in Lakewood, Colorado. He served as the first President of the bank which later became FirstBank and afterwards served on the board of directors for many years. He also served on the board of many other companies and organizations including the Federal Reserve Bank of Kansas City.

In 2001 Reisher created the Reisher Family Foundation, which is responsible for providing scholarships to students in Colorado who are transferring from a community college to a state four year college or university. As of 2014 more than 1,000 students had received a scholarship from the Reisher Family Foundation which totaled more than $15.7 million. As of 2016 the annual amount of scholarship funds distributed total about $2 million a year and the Foundation has $46.6 million in assets.

Reisher died on September 25, 2013.
