= Ough (orthography) =

Tetragraph in English

Ough is a four-letter sequence, a tetragraph, used in English orthography and notorious for its unpredictable pronunciation. It has at least eight pronunciations in North American English and nine in British English, and no discernible patterns exist for choosing among them.

== History ==
In Middle English, ough was regularly pronounced with a back rounded vowel and a velar fricative (e.g., [oːx], [oːɣ], [uːx] or [uːɣ]).

== List of pronunciations ==
Pronunciation	Examples	Note
/ʌf/	Brough, chough, clough, enough, Hough, rough, shough, slough (see below), sough, tough	Rhymes with puff, stuff. Clough and sough are also pronounced /aʊ/.
/ɒf/ or /ɔːf/	cough, Gough, trough, Frank Bough	Rhymes with off, scoff. Trough is pronounced /trɔːθ/ (troth) by some speakers of American English, and a baker's trough is also pronounced /troʊ/ in that variety.
/aʊ/	bough, clough, doughty, drought, plough, slough (see below), Slough, sough	Rhymes with cow, how. Clough and sough are also pronounced /ʌf/. Plough is generally spelled plow in American English.
/oʊ/	although, brougham, dough, furlough, Ough, though	Rhymes with no, toe. Brougham is also pronounced /uː/.
/ɔː/	abought, besought, bought, brought, fought, nought, ought, sought, thought, wrought	Rhymes with caught, taught. Regularly so used before /t/, except in doughty /ˈdaʊti/ and drought /draʊt/. Realized as [ɒ] or [ɑː] in dialects exhibiting the cot-caught merger.
/uː/	brougham, slough (see below), through	Rhymes with true, woo. Brougham is also pronounced /oʊ/.
/ə/	borough, Poughkeepsie, thorough, Willoughby, yarborough	Pronounced /oʊ/ when at the end of a word in American English (borough and thorough thus rhyme with burrow and furrow), but reduced to /ə/ when followed by another syllable in many dialects (such as in thoroughly).
/ʌp/, /əp/	hiccough	Variant spelling of the more common hiccup.
/əf/	Greenough	Pronounced /ˈɡrɛnəf/ as the name of a river in Western Australia, and usually pronounced /ˈɡriːnoʊ/ as a surname.
/ɒk/	hough	Rhymes with dock, lock. More commonly spelled hock from the 20th century onwards.
/ɒx/	Brough, Clough, lough, turlough	Rhymes with Scots loch. Many speakers substitute [k] for [x].

Slough has three pronunciations, depending on its meaning:

- /slʌf/ (for the noun meaning a skin shed by an animal, for the verb derived from it, and for the adjective derived from it)
- /slaʊ/ (for the noun meaning a muddy area, and for the verb derived from it. Also for the noun meaning a state of depression)
- /sluː/ (alternative American pronunciation for the noun meaning a muddy area, and for the verb derived from it)

The town of Slough in the Thames Valley of England is /slaʊ/.

An example sentence using the nine pronunciations commonly found in modern usage (and excluding hough, which is now a rarely used spelling) is, "The wind was rough along the lough as the ploughman fought through the snow, and though he hiccoughed and coughed, his work was thorough."

Another, slightly shorter example would be, "The rough, dough-faced ploughman fought through the borough to the lough, hiccoughing and coughing."

Other pronunciations can be found in proper nouns, many of which are of Celtic origin (Irish, Scottish or Welsh) rather than English. For example, ough can represent /ɒk/ in the surname Coughlin, /juː/ in Ayscough, and /i/ in the name Colcolough (/ˈkoʊkli/) in the United States.

The two occurrences of ⟨ough⟩ in the English place name Loughborough are pronounced differently, resulting in /ˈlʌfbərə/. Additionally, three parishes of Milton Keynes—Woughton /ˈwʊftən/, Loughton /ˈlaʊtən/ and Broughton /ˈbrɔːtən/— have different pronunciations of the combination.

Tough, though, through and thorough are formed by adding another letter each time, yet none of them rhyme (in American English, however, though and thorough both have /oʊ/).

Some humorous verse has been written to illustrate this seeming incongruity:

- "A rough-coated, dough-faced ploughman strode, coughing and hiccoughing, thoughtfully through the streets of Scarborough."
- "O-U-G-H" by Charles Battell Loomis
- "Ough, a Phonetic Fantasy" by William Thomas Goodge
- "I take it you already know" by T. S. Watt
- "Enough Is Enough" by Rosemary Chen

== Spelling reforms ==
Because of the unpredictability of the combination, many English spelling reformers have proposed replacing it with more phonetic combinations, some of which have caught on in varying degrees of formal and informal success. Generally, spelling reforms have been more widely accepted in the United States and less so in other English-speaking areas.

In April 1984, at its yearly meeting, the Simplified Spelling Society adopted the following reform as its house style:

- Change ⟨ough⟩ to ⟨uf⟩ when it is sounded as /ʌf/: enough → enuf, tough → tuf
- Change ⟨ough⟩ to ⟨of⟩ when it is sounded as /ɒf/ or /ɔːf/: cough → cof
- Shorten ⟨ough⟩ to ⟨ou⟩ when it is sounded as /aʊ/: bough → bou, drought → drout, plough → plou
- Shorten ⟨ough⟩ to ⟨o⟩ when it is sounded as /oʊ/: though → tho (but doh for dough)
- Change ⟨ough⟩ to ⟨au⟩ when it is sounded as /ɔː/: bought → baut, ought → aut, thought → thaut
- Shorten ⟨ough⟩ to ⟨u⟩ when it is sounded as /uː/: through → thru
