= Ough, Nebraska =

Human settlement in the United States

Coordinates: 40°19′20″N 101°30′46″W

Ough is an unincorporated community in Dundy County, Nebraska, United States.

== History ==
A post office was established at Ough in 1886, and remained in operation until it was discontinued in 1912. The community hit a peak population of 25 in 1890. It is named for John Ough, the first postmaster, and his three brothers.
