= Beaver Creek (Colorado) =

Physical characteristics
- Source
  - coordinates: 39°21′08″N 103°51′42″W
- Mouth
  - location: Confluence with South Platte
  - coordinates: 40°20′38″N 103°32′46″W
  - elevation: 4,150 ft (1,260 m)
- Basin size: 1,135 mi^{2} (2,940 km^{2})

Basin features
- Progression: South Platte—Platte— Missouri—Mississippi

Beaver Creek is a 165-mile-long (266 km) tributary of the South Platte River in Colorado. The creek flows from a source in Elbert County to a confluence with the South Platte in Morgan County near Hillrose.

== See also ==
- List of rivers of Colorado
