= Lemoyne, Nebraska =

- Census-designated place
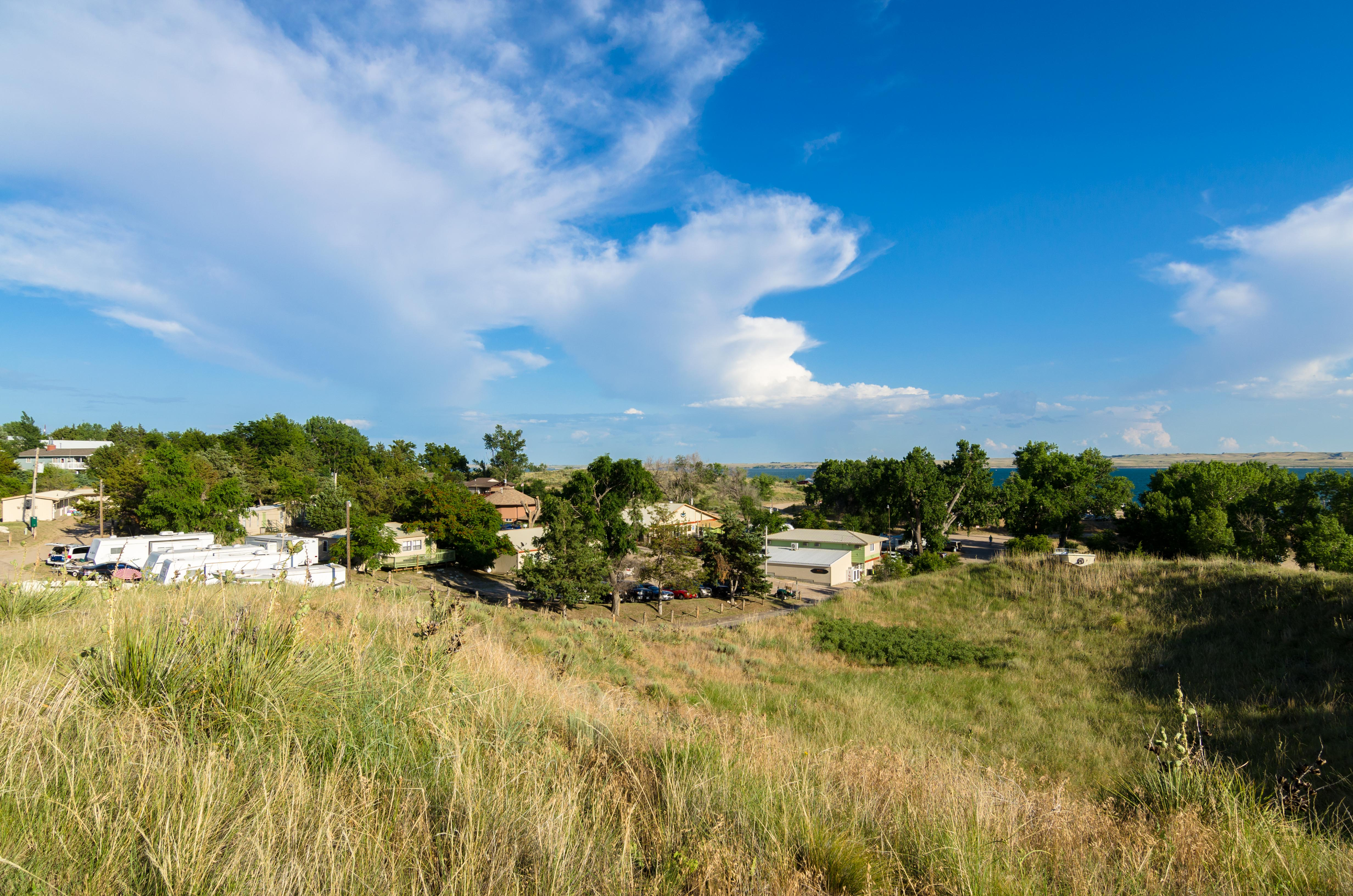
- Lemoyne from the shore of Lake McConaughy

- Location within Nebraska Location within the United States
- Coordinates: 41°16′36″N 101°48′48″W
- Country: United States
- State: Nebraska
- County: Keith
- Founded: 1911

Area
  - Total: 0.51 sq mi (1.32 km^{2})
  - Land: 0.51 sq mi (1.32 km^{2})
  - Water: 0 sq mi (0.00 km^{2})
- Elevation: 3,347 ft (1,020 m)

Population (2020)
  - Total: 44
  - Density: 86.3/sq mi (33.33/km^{2})
- Time zone: UTC-6 (Central (CST))
  - Summer (DST): UTC-5 (CDT)
- ZIP code: 69146
- FIPS code: 31-26595
- GNIS feature ID: 2583887

Lemoyne is an unincorporated community and census-designated place (CDP) in northwestern Keith County, Nebraska, United States. As of the 2020 census, Lemoyne had a population of 44.

It lies along Nebraska Highway 92 on the northern shore of Lake C.W. McConaughy, 20 miles (32 km) by road north of the city of Ogallala, the county seat of Keith County.

Although Lemoyne is unincorporated, it has a post office, with the ZIP code of 69146.

== History ==
=== Founding ===
In 1909, the Union Pacific Railroad completed a branch line through the North Platte Valley. Lemoyne Jacobs, a local landowner, had strongly petitioned Union Pacific to build the line and later allowed the railroad to build it through his property. In 1911, the town of Lemoyne was surveyed and named in honor of Jacobs' active role in bringing the railroad to the area.

The town grew steadily throughout the early 1900s. In 1915, the Lemoyne School District was formed for 19 enrolled students. The following year the Western Bridge Construction Company built a bridge across the nearby North Platte River with bond money. In 1918, local businessmen invested $3,500, roughly $77,000 today, to build a hotel in the town. By 1924, the town had a population of 200 residents, served by Bethany Presbyterian Church (1919) and an expanded school.

=== Relocation ===
In 1935, a diversion dam was built near Keystone, Nebraska. By 1937, residents of Lemoyne were informed that they must relocate out of the area to make way for Lake McConaughy. While some residents attempted to prevent the creation of the lake, the town was eventually relocated. Beginning in 1937, buildings in Lemoyne were dismantled, hauled to the hills north of the town's original site, and reconstructed. By 1941, the physical structures of the town were removed and the site was submerged under 50 feet (15 m) of water.

The new town was initially named "New Lemoyne", but the name eventually reverted to simply "Lemoyne". After the relocation, some residents chose to move elsewhere, and the community did not continue the pattern of growth it had enjoyed in its earlier history.

In 2004, severe drought depleted the waters of Lake McConaughy to 350,000 acre feet of water. This drop in water was enough to expose the foundations of the original town site for the first time in 63 years.
