= Ough (surname) =

Ough is an English surname. Notable people with the surname include:

- Barry Ough (1957–2014), Australian rules footballer
- Bruce R. Ough (born 1951), bishop of the United Methodist Church
- Norman A. Ough (1898–1965), British marine model maker
- Onyinye Ough, Nigerian author, speaker, and political activist
- Tom Ough, British journalist, editor, and author
- Wayne Ough (born 1978), Australian former professional baseball player
