= Dundy County, Nebraska =

County in Nebraska, United States

- County
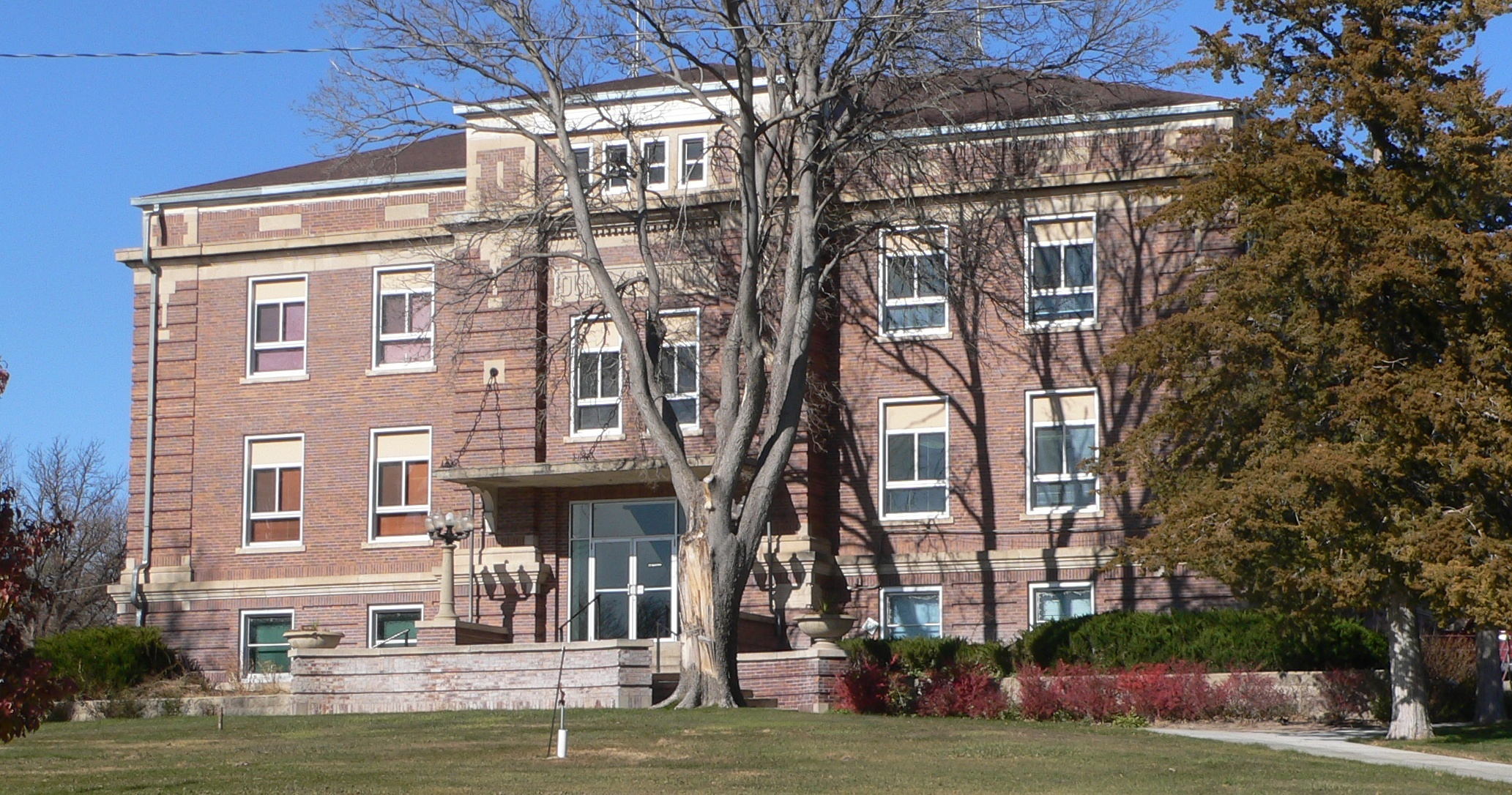
- Dundy County Courthouse in Benkelman

- Location within the U.S. state of Nebraska
- Coordinates: 40°11′N 101°41′W
- Country: United States
- State: Nebraska
- Founded: 1873 (authorized); 1884 (organized)
- Named for: Elmer Scipio Dundy
- Seat: Benkelman
- Largest city: Benkelman

Area
  - Total: 921 sq mi (2,390 km^{2})
  - Land: 920 sq mi (2,400 km^{2})
  - Water: 1.2 sq mi (3.1 km^{2}) 0.1%

Population (2020)
  - Total: 1,654
  - Estimate (2025): 1,568 ▼
  - Density: 2/sq mi (0.77/km^{2})
- Time zone: UTC−7 (Mountain)
  - Summer (DST): UTC−6 (MDT)
- Congressional district: 3rd
- Website: dundycounty.ne.gov

Dundy County is a county in the U.S. state of Nebraska. As of the 2020 United States census, the population was 1,654. Its county seat is Benkelman.

In the Nebraska license plate system, Dundy County is represented by the prefix 76 (it had the seventy-sixth-largest number of vehicles registered in the county when the license plate system was established in 1922).

== History ==
Dundy County was formed in 1873 and attached to neighboring Hitchcock County. It was named after Judge Elmer Scipio Dundy. The county government was organized in 1884.

== Geography ==
Dundy County lies at the lower SW corner of Nebraska. Its west boundary line abuts the east line of the state of Colorado, and its south boundary line abuts the north boundary line of the state of Kansas. According to the US Census Bureau, the county has an area of 921 square miles (2,390 km^{2}), of which 920 square miles (2,400 km^{2}) is land and 1.2 square miles (3.1 km^{2}) (0.1%) is water.

=== Major highways ===
- U.S. Highway 34
- Nebraska Highway 27
- Nebraska Highway 61

=== Adjacent counties ===
- Hitchcock County – east
- Rawlins County, Kansas – southeast
- Cheyenne County, Kansas – south
- Yuma County, Colorado – west
- Chase County – north
- Hayes County – northeast

== Protected areas ==
- Rock Creek State Recreation Area

== Demographics ==
Historical population
Census	Pop.	Note	%±
1880	37		—
1890	4,012		10,743.2%
1900	2,434		−39.3%
1910	4,098		68.4%
1920	4,869		18.8%
1930	5,610		15.2%
1940	5,122		−8.7%
1950	4,354		−15.0%
1960	3,570		−18.0%
1970	2,926		−18.0%
1980	2,861		−2.2%
1990	2,582		−9.8%
2000	2,292		−11.2%
2010	2,008		−12.4%
2020	1,654		−17.6%
2025 (est.)	1,568	▼	−5.2%
US Decennial Census; 1790–1960 1900–1990; 1990–2000 2010–2013

=== 2020 census ===
As of the 2020 census, the county had a population of 1,654. The median age was 48.8 years. 19.8% of residents were under the age of 18 and 26.1% of residents were 65 years of age or older. For every 100 females there were 101.2 males, and for every 100 females age 18 and over there were 100.5 males age 18 and over.

The racial makeup of the county was 91.1% White, 0.4% Black or African American, 1.2% American Indian and Alaska Native, 0.1% Asian, 0.2% Native Hawaiian and Pacific Islander, 2.4% from some other race, and 4.7% from two or more races. Hispanic or Latino residents of any race comprised 6.2% of the population.

0.0% of residents lived in urban areas, while 100.0% lived in rural areas.

There were 773 households in the county, of which 23.7% had children under the age of 18 living with them and 23.7% had a female householder with no spouse or partner present. About 35.7% of all households were made up of individuals and 18.7% had someone living alone who was 65 years of age or older.

There were 1,008 housing units, of which 23.3% were vacant. Among occupied housing units, 72.8% were owner-occupied and 27.2% were renter-occupied. The homeowner vacancy rate was 2.4% and the rental vacancy rate was 11.4%.

=== 2000 census ===
As of the 2000 United States census, there were 2,292 people, 961 households, and 637 families in the county. The population density was 2 people per square mile (0.77 people/km^{2}). There were 1,196 housing units at an average density of 1 units per square mile (0.39/km^{2}). The racial makeup of the county was 96.95% White, 0.04% Black or African American, 0.79% Native American, 0.48% Asian, 0.04% Pacific Islander, 0.87% from other races, and 0.83% from two or more races. 3.23% of the population were Hispanic or Latino of any race. 41.9% were of German, 13.2% American, 13.2% English and 6.3% Irish ancestry.

There were 961 households, out of which 27.80% had children under the age of 18 living with them, 59.90% were married couples living together, 3.90% had a female householder with no husband present, and 33.70% were non-families. 30.90% of all households were made up of individuals, and 17.60% had someone living alone who was 65 years of age or older. The average household size was 2.29 and the average family size was 2.87.

The county population contained 23.30% under the age of 18, 5.70% from 18 to 24, 23.50% from 25 to 44, 25.10% from 45 to 64, and 22.40% who were 65 years of age or older. For every 100 females there were 96.90 males. For every 100 females age 18 and over, there were 93.40 males.

The median income for a household in the county was $27,010, and the median income for a family was $35,862. Males had a median income of $22,415 versus $18,583 for females. The per capita income for the county was $15,786. About 11.00% of families and 13.60% of the population were below the poverty line, including 16.10% of those under age 18 and 15.00% of those age 65 or over.

== Communities ==
=== City ===
- Benkelman (county seat)

=== Village ===
- Haigler

=== Census-designated places ===
- Max
- Parks

=== Other unincorporated communities ===
- Lamont
- Max
- Parks
- Sanborn

=== Former community ===
- Ough

== Politics ==
Dundy County voters are reliably Republican. In only three national elections since 1900 has the county selected the Democratic Party candidate, and it has not done so since Franklin D. Roosevelt's 46 state landslide in 1936. Donald Trump's 89% of the vote in 2024 is the largest share of the vote for a winning candidate in the county's history.

United States presidential election results for Dundy County, Nebraska
Year	Republican		Democratic		Third party(ies)	
Year	No.	%	No.	%	No.	%
1900	308	50.99%	283	46.85%	13	2.15%
1904	395	65.61%	92	15.28%	115	19.10%
1908	486	52.83%	391	42.50%	43	4.67%
1912	148	16.82%	304	34.55%	428	48.64%
1916	347	35.52%	570	58.34%	60	6.14%
1920	1,094	69.59%	375	23.85%	103	6.55%
1924	1,036	56.67%	459	25.11%	333	18.22%
1928	1,575	76.42%	472	22.90%	14	0.68%
1932	974	41.38%	1,344	57.09%	36	1.53%
1936	1,054	43.77%	1,328	55.15%	26	1.08%
1940	1,441	64.22%	803	35.78%	0	0.00%
1944	1,320	68.29%	613	31.71%	0	0.00%
1948	935	59.14%	646	40.86%	0	0.00%
1952	1,670	80.79%	397	19.21%	0	0.00%
1956	1,196	70.73%	495	29.27%	0	0.00%
1960	1,245	71.92%	486	28.08%	0	0.00%
1964	911	56.13%	712	43.87%	0	0.00%
1968	1,001	72.01%	261	18.78%	128	9.21%
1972	1,003	81.94%	221	18.06%	0	0.00%
1976	774	61.28%	457	36.18%	32	2.53%
1980	1,138	80.65%	192	13.61%	81	5.74%
1984	992	80.98%	225	18.37%	8	0.65%
1988	828	70.29%	333	28.27%	17	1.44%
1992	664	52.99%	245	19.55%	344	27.45%
1996	752	68.30%	224	20.35%	125	11.35%
2000	801	79.23%	179	17.71%	31	3.07%
2004	858	81.48%	186	17.66%	9	0.85%
2008	783	76.84%	218	21.39%	18	1.77%
2012	792	80.41%	176	17.87%	17	1.73%
2016	823	86.36%	89	9.34%	41	4.30%
2020	883	88.04%	105	10.47%	15	1.50%
2024	829	89.04%	96	10.31%	6	0.64%

== See also ==
- National Register of Historic Places listings in Dundy County, Nebraska
