= Haigler, Nebraska =

Village in Dundy County, Nebraska, United States

- Village
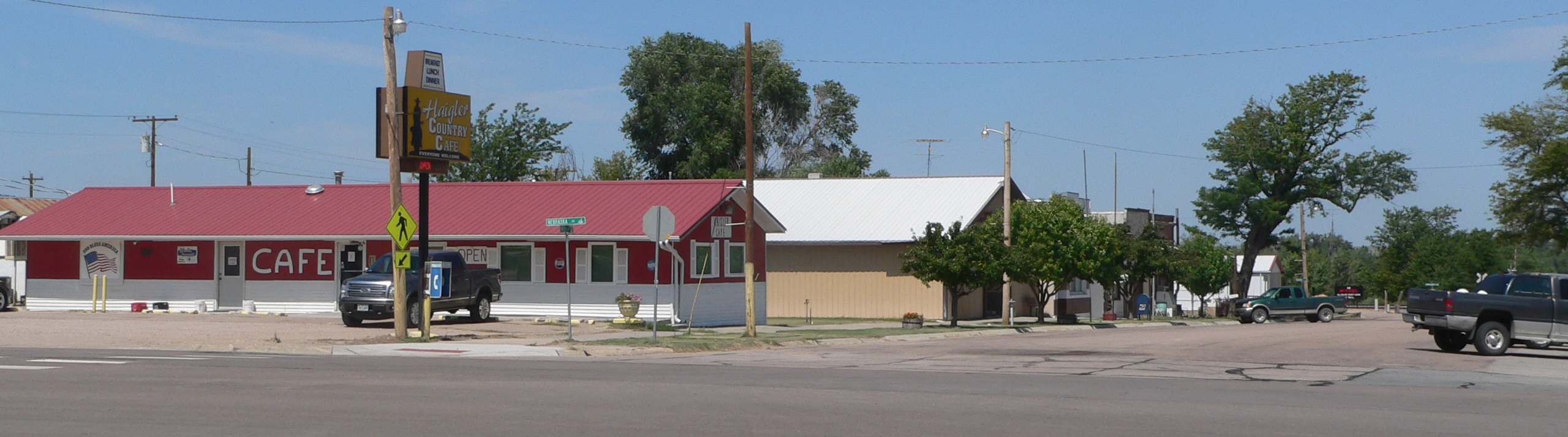
- Downtown Haigler: junction of Nebraska Avenue (U.S. Route 34) and Porter Avenue, August 2013

- Location of Haigler, Nebraska
- Coordinates: 40°00′44″N 101°56′19″W
- Country: United States
- State: Nebraska
- County: Dundy

Area
  - Total: 0.24 sq mi (0.63 km^{2})
  - Land: 0.24 sq mi (0.63 km^{2})
  - Water: 0 sq mi (0.00 km^{2})
- Elevation: 3,284 ft (1,001 m)

Population (2020)
  - Total: 145
  - Density: 597.5/sq mi (230.71/km^{2})
- Time zone: UTC-7 (Mountain (MST))
  - Summer (DST): UTC-6 (MDT)
- ZIP code: 69030
- Area code: 308
- FIPS code: 31-20540
- GNIS feature ID: 2398221
- Website: www.haiglerne.com

Haigler is a village in southwestern Dundy County, Nebraska, United States. As of the 2020 census, Haigler had a population of 145.

== History ==
Haigler was platted in 1886. It was named for Jacob Haigler, a pioneer settler.

== Geography ==
According to the United States Census Bureau, the village has a total area of 0.24 square miles (0.62 km^{2}), all land.

=== Climate ===
Climate data for Haigler, Nebraska (1991–2020)
Month	Jan	Feb	Mar	Apr	May	Jun	Jul	Aug	Sep	Oct	Nov	Dec	Year
Mean daily maximum °F (°C)	42.8 (6.0)	45.9 (7.7)	56.2 (13.4)	63.9 (17.7)	73.2 (22.9)	85.3 (29.6)	90.8 (32.7)	88.3 (31.3)	80.6 (27.0)	67.2 (19.6)	54.1 (12.3)	43.9 (6.6)	66.0 (18.9)
Daily mean °F (°C)	28.6 (−1.9)	31.4 (−0.3)	40.8 (4.9)	48.9 (9.4)	59.5 (15.3)	70.8 (21.6)	76.6 (24.8)	73.8 (23.2)	64.9 (18.3)	51.0 (10.6)	39.0 (3.9)	29.7 (−1.3)	51.3 (10.7)
Mean daily minimum °F (°C)	14.4 (−9.8)	16.8 (−8.4)	25.4 (−3.7)	33.9 (1.1)	45.7 (7.6)	56.3 (13.5)	62.3 (16.8)	59.3 (15.2)	49.1 (9.5)	34.8 (1.6)	23.9 (−4.5)	15.4 (−9.2)	36.4 (2.5)
Average precipitation inches (mm)	0.42 (11)	0.56 (14)	0.83 (21)	1.79 (45)	2.68 (68)	2.55 (65)	2.97 (75)	2.68 (68)	1.27 (32)	1.31 (33)	0.53 (13)	0.59 (15)	18.18 (460)
Average snowfall inches (cm)	4.6 (12)	4.2 (11)	3.3 (8.4)	1.2 (3.0)	0.1 (0.25)	0.0 (0.0)	0.0 (0.0)	0.0 (0.0)	0.0 (0.0)	1.4 (3.6)	2.0 (5.1)	5.2 (13)	22 (56.35)
Source: NOAA

== Demographics ==
Historical population
Census	Pop.	Note	%±
1910	205		—
1920	450		119.5%
1930	535		18.9%
1940	507		−5.2%
1950	398		−21.5%
1960	268		−32.7%
1970	237		−11.6%
1980	225		−5.1%
1990	225		0.0%
2000	211		−6.2%
2010	158		−25.1%
2020	145		−8.2%
U.S. Decennial Census

=== 2010 census ===
As of the census of 2010, there were 158 people, 79 households, and 45 families residing in the village. The population density was 658.3 inhabitants per square mile (254.2/km^{2}). There were 101 housing units at an average density of 420.8 per square mile (162.5/km^{2}). The racial makeup of the village was 93.7% White, 0.6% African American, 2.5% Native American, 1.3% from other races, and 1.9% from two or more races. Hispanic or Latino of any race were 5.7% of the population.

There were 79 households, of which 17.7% had children under the age of 18 living with them, 50.6% were married couples living together, 2.5% had a female householder with no husband present, 3.8% had a male householder with no wife present, and 43.0% were non-families. 40.5% of all households were made up of individuals, and 20.3% had someone living alone who was 65 years of age or older. The average household size was 2.00 and the average family size was 2.67.

The median age in the village was 51.3 years. 17.1% of residents were under the age of 18; 2.6% were between the ages of 18 and 24; 19% were from 25 to 44; 33.6% were from 45 to 64; and 27.8% were 65 years of age or older. The gender makeup of the village was 54.4% male and 45.6% female.

=== 2000 census ===
As of the census of 2000, there were 211 people, 92 households, and 57 families residing in the village. The population density was 871.5 inhabitants per square mile (336.5/km^{2}). There were 104 housing units at an average density of 429.6 per square mile (165.9/km^{2}). The racial makeup of the village was 93.84% White, 0.95% Native American, 3.32% from other races, and 1.90% from two or more races. Hispanic or Latino of any race were 7.11% of the population.

There were 92 households, out of which 26.1% had children under the age of 18 living with them, 52.2% were married couples living together, 4.3% had a female householder with no husband present, and 37.0% were non-families. 32.6% of all households were made up of individuals, and 16.3% had someone living alone who was 65 years of age or older. The average household size was 2.29 and the average family size was 2.86.

In the village, the population was spread out, with 25.1% under the age of 18, 7.1% from 18 to 24, 24.2% from 25 to 44, 20.9% from 45 to 64, and 22.7% who were 65 years of age or older. The median age was 42 years. For every 100 females, there were 102.9 males. For every 100 females age 18 and over, there were 102.6 males.

As of 2000 the median income for a household in the village was $25,000, and the median income for a family was $27,500. Males had a median income of $21,563 versus $23,125 for females. The per capita income for the village was $15,634. About 7.7% of families and 8.5% of the population were below the poverty line, including 7.1% of those under the age of eighteen and 10.5% of those 65 or over.

== Notable people ==
- Scott Olin Wright, United States District Court judge, was born in Haigler.
