= National Register of Historic Places listings in Chase County, Nebraska =

Location of Chase County in Nebraska

Chase County, Nebraska, United States, has seven properties and districts listed on the National Register of Historic Places.

This National Park Service list is complete through NPS recent listings posted October 30, 2026.

== Current listings ==
| | Name on the Register | Image | Date listed | Location | City or town | Description |
|---|---|---|---|---|---|---|
| 1 | Balcony House | Balcony House | July 5, 2000 (#00000767) | 1006 Court St. 40°31′17″N 101°38′40″W | Imperial | 1921 hotel of a tourist camp on the Lincoln Highway, built around a relocated and expanded 1880s schoolhouse. Now a bed & breakfast. |
| 2 | Champion Mill | Champion Mill | June 23, 1988 (#88000913) | Mill and 2nd Sts. 40°28′14″N 101°45′02″W | Champion | Water-powered flour and feed mill complex operating 1889–1968, whose mill pond was a popular recreation site. No longer a state historical park, it was transferred to the county in 2013. |
| 3 | Chase County Courthouse | Chase County Courthouse | January 10, 1990 (#89002222) | Broadway between 9th and 10th Sts. 40°31′14″N 101°38′38″W | Imperial | Built 1910–1912 of dark brick and limestone trim, with Jacobethan features unique in Nebraska courthouses. |
| 4 | Lovett Site | | May 5, 1972 (#72000745) | Address Restricted | Wauneta | A key archaeological site of the Dismal River culture, an Apache people who had a mixed Southwestern/Plains Indian lifestyle 1675–1725 CE. |
| 5 | Pinkie's Corner | Pinkie's Corner | December 7, 2011 (#11000885) | Southwestern corner of the junction of U.S. Route 6 and 323rd Ave. 40°32′14″N 101°49′08″W | Imperial | 1920s–30s business site of handyman and inventor C. Roy Elvis "Pinkie" Hedges. |
| 6 | Texas Trail Stone Corral | Texas Trail Stone Corral | December 9, 2002 (#02001478) | Nebraska Highway 61 north of Imperial; 40°35′33″N 101°37′38″W | Imperial | Two surviving walls of a c. 1876 dry stone corral, a rare relic of cattle drives along the Texas Trail. |
| 7 | Wauneta Roller Mills | Wauneta Roller Mills | March 12, 2008 (#08000169) | 112 N. Arapahoe; 40°25′03″N 101°22′23″W | Wauneta | 1925 roller mill, plus the owners' 1929 bungalow residence and garage/shop, representative of the significant flour and grain milling industry. |

== See also ==
- List of National Historic Landmarks in Nebraska
- National Register of Historic Places listings in Nebraska
