= List of corrals =

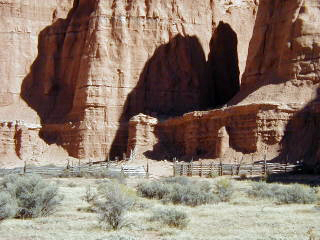
Cathedral Valley Corral, Utah

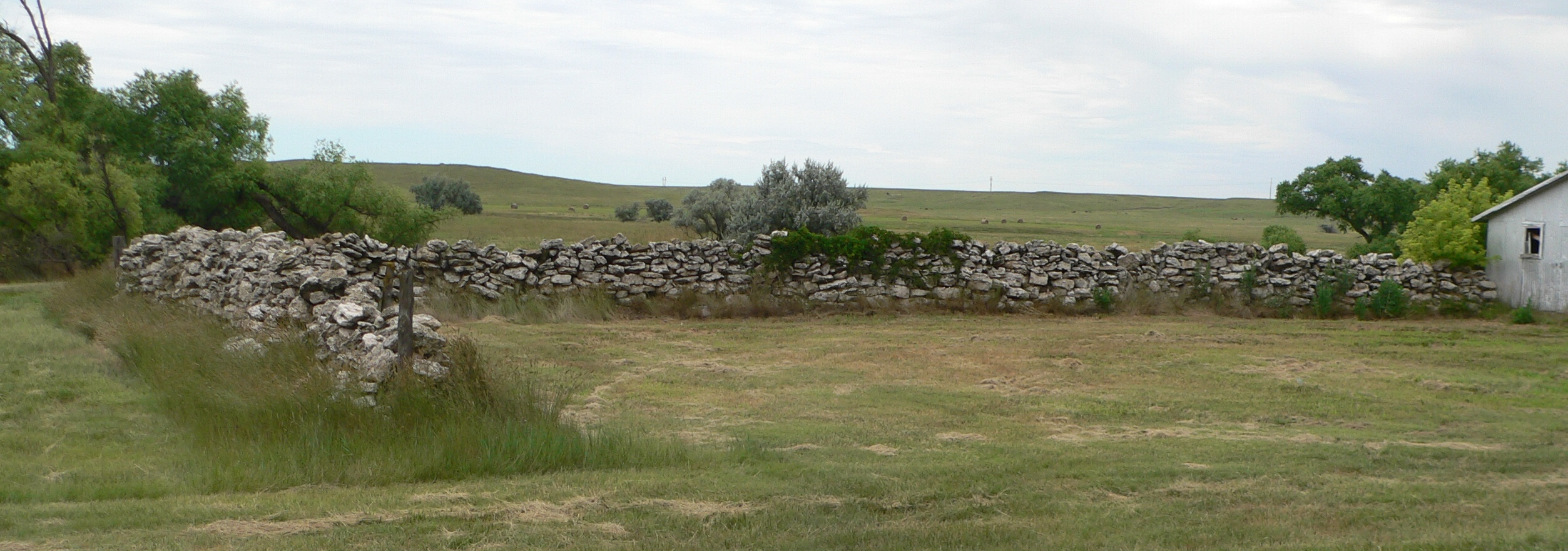
Remnant of Texas Trail Stone Corral, Nebraska

This is a list of notable corrals used to enclose horses and other livestock. In the American west, a number of historic corrals are listed on the U.S. National Register of Historic Places (NRHP). Among these are corrals used to trap or hold wild horses, corrals used to support cavalry, and corrals which otherwise supported usage of horses in ranching or other activities.

The Union Stock Yards in Chicago had 2,300 separate livestock pens, but probably no ones that were individually notable.

In 2019, a pen in Revelstoke, British Columbia, Canada, took in the last individual caribou which had migrated in and out of the contiguous United States.

Notable corrals in the United States, past and present, include:

- O.K. Corral, Tombstone, Arizona, existing from 1879 to about 1888
- Cavalry Corrals, Tucson, Arizona, NRHP-listed
- Quartermaster's Corrals, Tucson, Arizona, NRHP-listed
- Corral de Piedra, San Luis Obispo, California, NRHP-listed
- Indian Stone Corral, Orangevale, California, NRHP-listed
- 6.4 acres (2.6 ha) corral of Salida Livestock Commission Company, Salida, Colorado, NRHP-listed
- Texas Trail Stone Corral, Imperial, Nebraska, NRHP-listed
- James Wild Horse Trap, Fish Springs, Nevada, NRHP-listed
- Jose Olguin Barn-Corral Complex, Mora, New Mexico, NRHP-listed
- Rock Corral on the Barlow Road, Brightwood, Oregon, NRHP-listed
- Stone Corrals No. 1-6 (41OL250), Amarillo, Texas, NRHP-listed
- In the Texas Panhandle there are 11 isolated animal pens and numerous more pens at temporary or permanent habitation sites of pastores (New Mexican hispanic shepherds), which were listed on the National Register based on a "New Mexican Pastor Sites in Texas Panhandle Thematic Resources" study. The pastores flourished especially during 1875 to 1880. Numerous sites were founded as result of 1876 immigration of a group led by Casimero Romero, which brought a dozen or more oxen-pulled freight wagons, about 4,500 head of sheep, and some horses and cattle. Of the 11 isolated ones, seven are U-shaped or semicircular and built against a steep slope that serves as a back wall, with or without additional smaller pen units attached. Free-standing ones are rectangular or ovoid. These are located on private ranchlands in, at least, Oldham County, Floyd County, and Armstrong County, and their exact locations/addresses are restricted.
  - Floyd County Stone Corral, Floydada, Floyd County, Texas, NRHP-listed under New Mexican Pastor Sites in Texas Panhandle Thematic Resources
  - Palo Duro Pen (41AM5) (1880), Armstrong County, Texas, NRHP-listed under New Mexican Pastor Sites in Texas Panhandle Thematic Resources
- Swett Ranch corral (1905), Daggett County, Utah, NRHP-listed
- Cathedral Valley Corral, Torrey, Utah, NRHP-listed
- Lesley Morrell Line Cabin and Corral, Torrey, Utah, NRHP-listed
- Strap Iron Corral, Hooper, Washington, NRHP-listed
- Natural Corrals Archeological Site (48SW336), South Superior, Wyoming, NRHP-listed

== See also ==
- List of rodeos
