= Stinchfield =

Stinchfield is a surname. Notable people with the surname include:

- Augustus Stinchfield (1842-1917), American physician
- Frederick Harold Stinchfield (1881–1950), American attorney
- Roxana Stinchfield Ferris (1895–1978), American botanist
- Sara Mae Stinchfield Hawk (1885–1977), American speech therapist
