= Texas Trail (disambiguation) =

The Texas Trail was a cattle drive trail from Texas to Nebraska that was used during the 1870s and 1880s.

It may also refer to:

- Texas Trail (1937 film), a 1937 film starring William Boyd as Hop-Along Cassidy
- The Texas Trail, a 1925 western film featuring Harry Carey
- Texas Brazos Trail, a non-profit organization which promotes heritage tourism, economic development, and historic preservation

== See also ==
- Texas Trail Stone Corral, near Imperial, Nebraska, a surviving artifact of cattle drives along the Texas Trail, listed on the National Register of Historic Places
