= Enders Dam =

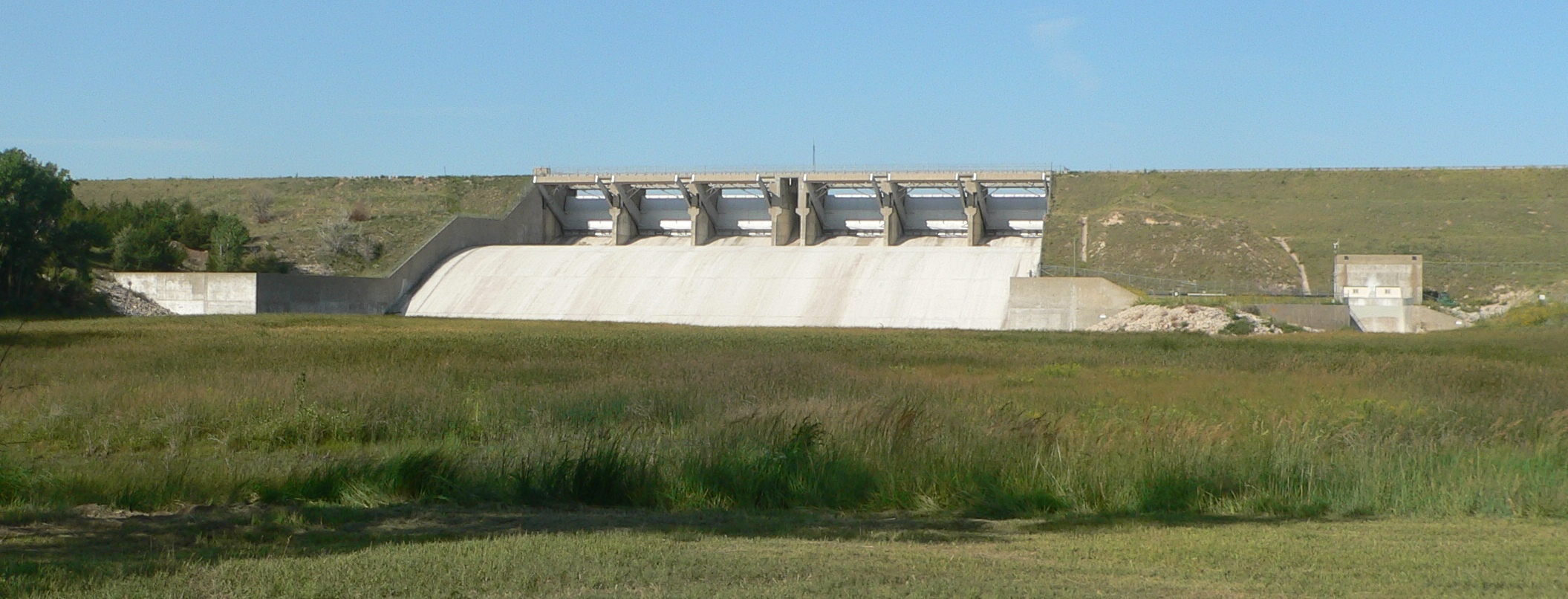
- Outlet structure at Enders Dam

- Location in Nebraska Enders Dam (the United States)
- Country: United States
- Location: Chase County, Nebraska
- Coordinates: 40°25′21″N 101°31′05″W
- Purpose: Water storage, flood control
- Construction began: 1947
- Opening date: 1951
- Owner: United States Bureau of Reclamation

Dam and spillways
- Type of dam: Earth fill dam
- Impounds: Frenchman Creek
- Height: 134 ft (41 m)
- Length: 2,603 ft (793 m)

Reservoir
- Creates: Enders Reservoir
- Total capacity: 34,500 acre-feet (42,600,000 m^{3})
- Surface area: 2.5 sq mi (6.5 km^{2})
- Normal elevation: 3,114 ft (949 m)

Enders Dam (National ID # NE01070) is a dam in Chase County, Nebraska, near the southwestern corner of the state.

The earthen dam was constructed between 1947 and 1951 by the United States Bureau of Reclamation. It is 134 feet (41 m) high and 2,603 feet (793 m) long at its crest. It impounds Frenchman Creek for irrigation storage and flood control, part of the Bureau's Frenchman-Cambridge Division of the extensive Pick-Sloan Missouri Basin Program. The dam is owned and operated by the Bureau.

The reservoir it creates, Enders Reservoir, has a water surface area of 2.5 square miles (6.5 km^{2}) at its maximum capacity of 34,500 acre-feet (42,600,000 m^{3}). The adjoining Enders Reservoir State Recreation Area is a popular location for fishing, hunting and other outdoor recreation activities.

Flows in the Frenchman, and associated releases from Enders Reservoir, have declined over the years. The primary cause is believed to be the lowering of water table levels due to groundwater irrigation in the Frenchman Basin. This has reduced the flows of springs that have historically fed the creek. In order to maintain the recreational and wildlife environments on the reservoir, irrigation releases were halted after 2002.
