= Prall =

Prall is a surname. Notable people with the surname include:

- Anning Smith Prall (1870–1937), representative from New York, born in Port Richmond, Staten Island
- David Prall (1886–1940), philosopher of art at the University of California
- Horace Griggs Prall (1881–1951), New Jersey attorney and Republican politician
- Warren Prall Watters (1890–1992), the founding Archbishop of the Free Church of Antioch (Malabar Rite)
- Willie Prall, former Major League Baseball pitcher

== See also ==
- Prall's Island, uninhabited island in the Arthur Kill between Staten Island, New York, and Linden, New Jersey, in the United States
