= Texas Trail =

Historic cattle trail in the United States

The Texas Trail, another name for the Great Western Cattle Trail, was used to drive cattle from Texas to Ogallala, Nebraska. This emerged as an alternative to the Chisholm Trail.

Near Imperial, Nebraska are portions of a dry stone corral which served the trail. The corral was built c.1876; it is listed on the National Register of Historic Places as Texas Trail Stone Corral.

According to one source the last cattle drive over the trail was in 1884, but others say there were drives later.

The XIT Ranch used the Texas Trail, connecting Tascosa to Dodge City until 1885. That was when the quarantine line was extended to southwestern Kansas.

== See also ==
- Great Western Cattle Trail
