= Pinkie's Corner =

- U.S. National Register of Historic Places
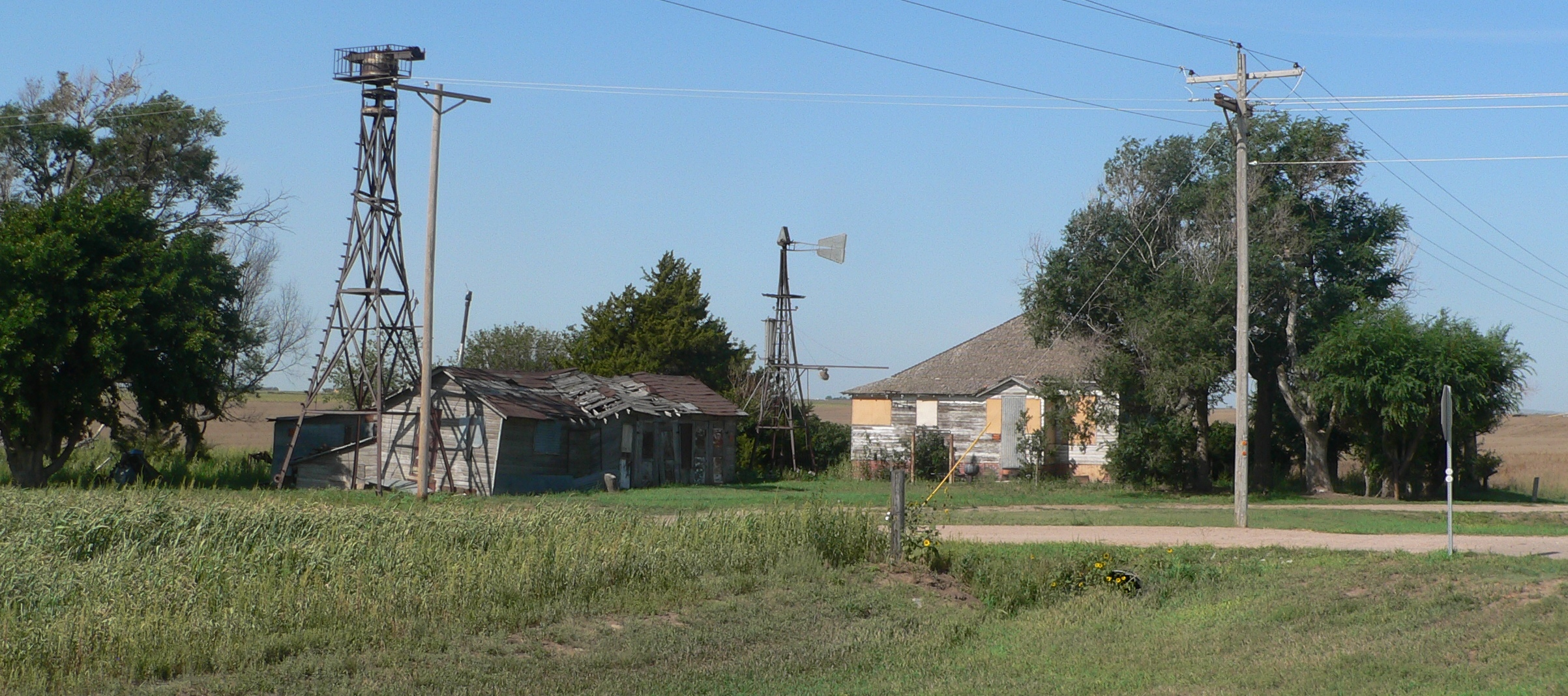

- Location within Nebraska Location within the United States
- Location: Southwestern corner of the junction of U.S. Route 6 and 323rd Ave.,Imperial, Nebraska
- Coordinates: 40.537222°N 101.818889°W
- NRHP reference No.: 11000885
- Added to NRHP: December 7, 2011

Pinkie's Corner in Chase County, Nebraska was listed on the National Register of Historic Places in 2011. It is an example of an early rural auto roadside business.

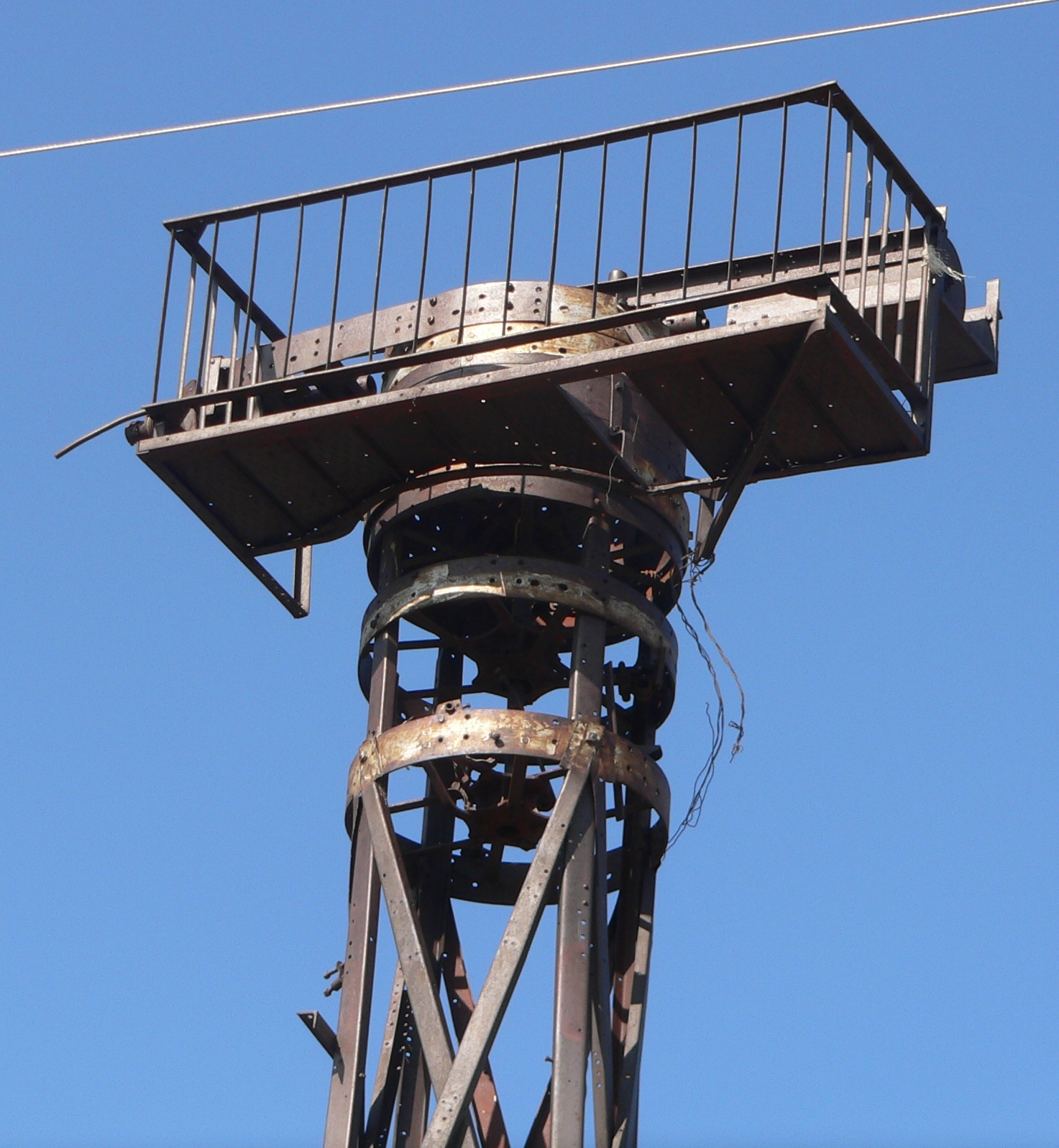
Wind charger

It was the 1920s–30s business site of handyman and inventor C. Roy Elvis "Pinkie" Hedges.

Pinkie became known as a "Supreme Do-It-Yourselfer", including in generating and using electricity before rural electrification became general. The site is a monument to resourcefulness during the hard times of the Great Depression.
