= Champion Mill (Nebraska) =

- U.S. National Register of Historic Places
- U.S. Historic district
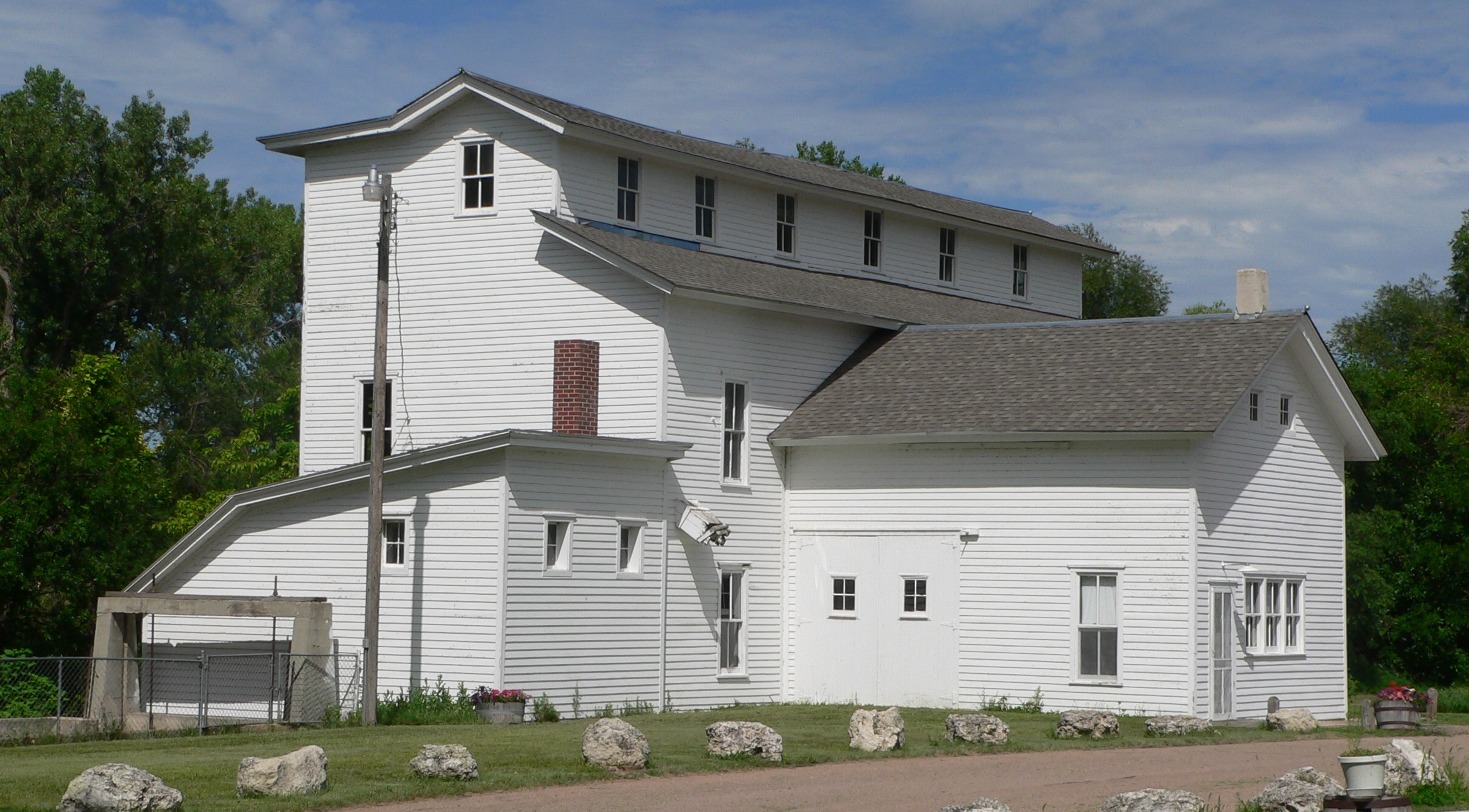
- Champion Mill building. The milldam is out of frame to the right.

- Location within Nebraska Location within the United States
- Location: Mill and Second Streets, Champion, Nebraska
- Coordinates: 40°28′14.34″N 101°45′1.84″W
- Area: 3.8 acres (1.5 ha)
- Built: 1888
- NRHP reference No.: 88000913
- Added to NRHP: June 23, 1988

Champion Mill is a historic flour and feed mill in Champion, in the southwestern part of the state of Nebraska, in the Midwestern United States. Built in 1888 and rebuilt in 1892 after a fire, the mill was used commercially until 1968. It is now a museum and park run by Chase County preserving the state's last working water-powered mill. The mill, headrace, and dam were added to the National Register of Historic Places as a historic district in 1988.

== Commercial mill ==
The town of Hamilton, later renamed Champion, was created as part of the inrush of settlers to the area in 1886. The location of the town was chosen because a natural three-foot (one meter) rock waterfall on the Frenchman Creek was deemed a prime site for a mill. Thomas Scott acquired land and water rights in exchange for his promise to build a mill on the site. An earthen dam and a mill were built and production of flour and animal feed began in 1889. The mill was rebuilt after a December 1891 fire and was back in operation a year later. The mill was expanded over the years, switching exclusively to feed in 1945. The site was used commercially by successive owners until it closed in 1968.

== Park ==
The mill complex was purchased by the Nebraska Game and Parks Commission in 1969. The mill became the Champion Mill State Historical Park and State Recreation Area; recreation had long been a part of the historical use of the mill pond and adjacent picnic and camping area. The mill building became a museum.

The mill complex was added to the National Register of Historic Places in 1988 for being a well-preserved and long-running example of mills common to the late-19th/early-20th centuries, and because its mill pond was a significant recreational destination in southwestern Nebraska. The historic district comprises the 1887 dam, headrace, and the three-story frame mill whose oldest sections was built in 1892.

In 2013 ownership of Champion Mill State Historical Park (SHP) and the adjacent 11-acre (4.5 ha) State Recreation Area (SRA) were transferred from the Nebraska Game and Parks Commission to Chase County. The site includes the lake created by the impoundment of Frenchman Creek.
