= George S. Metcalf =

American anthropologist

George Stephen Metcalf
- Born: October 29, 1900; Wauneta, Nebraska, U.S.
- Died: 1975 (aged 74–75)
- Occupations: Archeologist, Anthropologist

Academic work
- Institutions: Smithsonian Institution, Luther College (Iowa)
- Main interests: Great Plains, Plains Indians

George S. Metcalf (October 29, 1900 - 1975) was an American anthropologist, field archeologist and former supervisor of the Department of Archaeology at the Smithsonian Institution. Metcalf had no formal education past eighth grade, but was granted an honorary degree in 1970 from Luther College (Iowa). He is primarily known for his research on the Great Plains and the Plains Indians.
