= Lee Edward Travis =

American Educator and Speech Psychologist

- Born: June 23, 1896; Chase County, Nebraska, U.S.
- Died: October 10, 1987 (aged 91); Encino, California, U.S.
- Education: University of Iowa
- Known for: Speech pathology
- Awards: Fellow of the American Psychological Association
- Scientific career
- Fields: Psychology
- Workplaces: University of Iowa; University of Southern California; Fuller Seminary
- Thesis: An Objective Measurement of Suggestibility & Negativism by Means of Subliminal Sensory Stimuli; A Study in Clinical Psychology - Masters' Thesis (1923)
- Doctoral advisors: Carl Seashore
- Doctoral students: George Kelly; Wendell Johnson; Donald B. Lindsley

Lee Edward Travis (June 23, 1896, Nebraska – October 10, 1987) was one of the founding fathers of speech pathology in America.

== Life ==
Travis was born June 23, 1896, on a farm in Chase County, Nebraska, and raised near Champion, Nebraska. He was the second of thirteen children born to Charles Edward Travis and Mary Eunice Speer Travis.

He attended Graceland College for three years before transferring to the University of Iowa and obtaining his BA in 1922 and his MA in 1923, both in psychology. While a student, he became a member of Sigma Pi fraternity and Phi Beta Kappa honor society. He finished his PhD in 1924 and was one of the first people in the world to receive a doctorate based on the new field of speech pathology.

When his studies were completed, he taught at the University of Iowa where he became head of the defective speech clinic. Travis was one of the original 25 charter members for what is now known as the American Speech–Language–Hearing Association. The organization was founded in Travis' home after he held a dinner party for attendees of a University of Iowa sponsored conference on speech in 1925. He would later serve as the organization's president.

He was appointed as the head of the department of psychology in July 1937 but resigned without reason a few months later in January 1938. He went on to teach at the University of Southern California (USC). He took a break from teaching during World War II to serve in the USAAF Medical Corp. As a lieutenant colonel, he was in charge of the psychological services of several hospitals in the European theater.

He retired from USC in 1965. That year he became the first dean of the Psychology Department at Fuller Seminary. He retired from that position in 1975. The Travis Research Institute at Fuller is named for him.

He had many prolific writings and editing, most notably his editorial work for Handbook of Speech Pathology in 1957, which is still referenced. He is most known for his work in the field of stuttering.

He died October 10, 1987, aged 91, at his home in Encino, Los Angeles. His funeral was held at the Bel Air Presbyterian Church, where he was an elder.
