= Strap Iron Corral =

- U.S. National Register of Historic Places
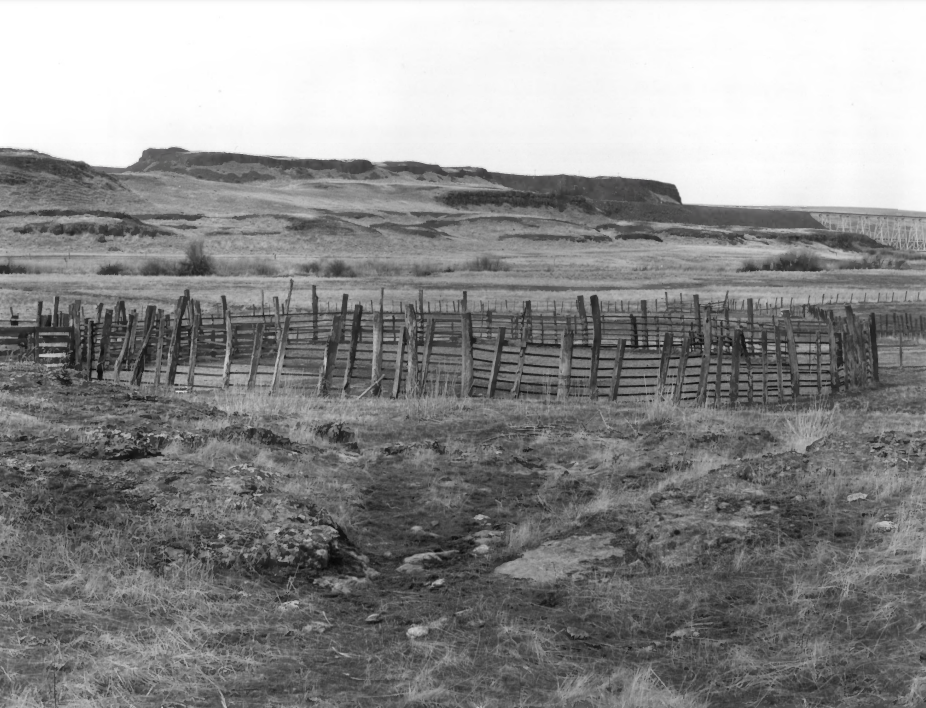

- Location within Washington (state) Location within the United States
- Location: On Cow Creek, about 5.8 miles (9.3 km) north of Hooper
- Nearest city: Hooper, Washington
- Coordinates: 46°50′19″N 118°07′36″W
- Area: less than one acre
- Built: 1878
- Architect: "Uncle Jim" Kennedy
- NRHP reference No.: 75001837
- Added to NRHP: August 1, 1975

The Strap Iron Corral, located about 5.8 miles (9.3 km) north of Hooper, Washington, is a historic corral built in the 1870s by "Uncle Jim" Kennedy. It was constructed of native rough-hewn lumber connected by 2.38-inch iron straps, once used as a cap for wooden rails of the Columbia River Railroad. This was converted to solid iron rails in 1875, and at least some of the straps were sold to Kennedy.

It was listed on the National Register of Historic Places in 1975.

== See also ==
- National Register of Historic Places listings in Washington state
