= Balcony House (Imperial, Nebraska) =

- U.S. National Register of Historic Places
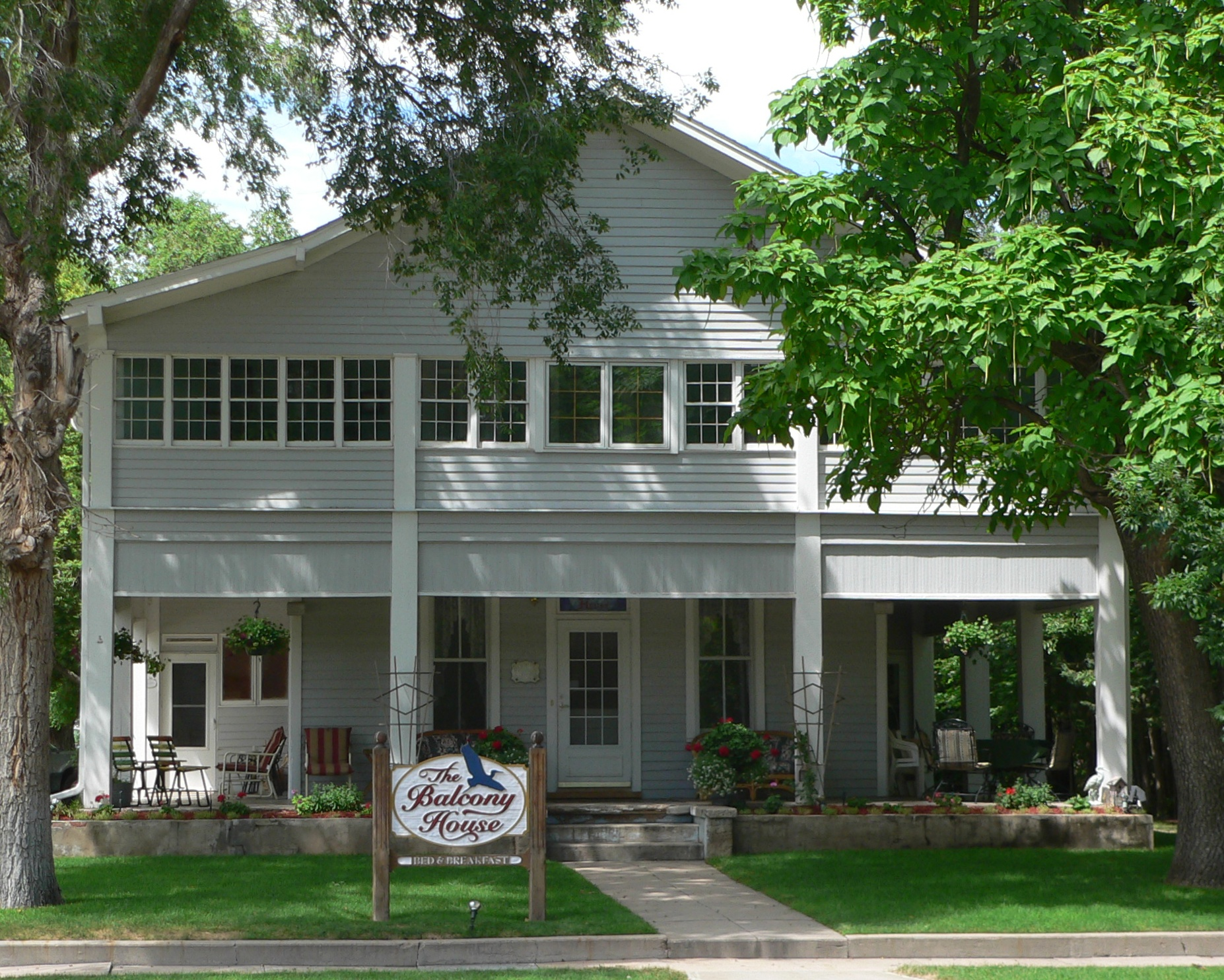

- Location within Nebraska Location within the United States
- Location: 1006 Court St., Imperial, Nebraska
- Coordinates: 40°31′12″N 101°38′40″W
- Area: less than one acre
- Built: 1921
- NRHP reference No.: 00000767
- Added to NRHP: July 5, 2000

The Balcony House is a historic building located at 1006 Court St. in Imperial, Nebraska. Initially constructed as a school, the building served as a hotel at a local tourist camp during the 1920s; it currently functions as a bed and breakfast. The building was added to the National Register of Historic Places on July 5, 2000.

== History ==
The building was constructed outside of Imperial in the 1880s and initially served as a school. In 1921, the Nebraska Fire Marshal condemned the school, and the building was moved to its current location. A two-story addition was added to the building after its move to replace a similar addition which was left at the original site. At its new site, the building served as a hotel for a tourist camp along the Detroit-Lincoln-Denver Highway, a transcontinental highway which crossed Nebraska along the modern route of U.S. Route 6. The tourist camp became a prominent local business, hosting as many as 300 visitors in a day; it also hosted events such as free concerts and received regular coverage in the local newspaper. The camp closed in 1930 after the Great Depression reduced leisure travel and deprived the business of its customers. In later years, the Balcony House served as a boarding house, a dormitory for high school students whose families lived out in the country or in small apartments. In the late 1980s, the house was abandoned after the owner and operator moved out of state. In 1997, the Balcony House was purchased by Jim and Linda Pirog. Renovation began that year, with the Pirogs finishing their major remodel of the house in 1999, and it was re-opened as a bed and breakfast.
