= Donald B. Lindsley =

American psychologist (1907–2003)

- Born: Donald Benjamin Lindsley; December 23, 1907; Brownhelm Township, Ohio, U.S.
- Died: June 19, 2003 (aged 95)
- Education: Wittenberg College; University of Iowa (PhD)
- Occupation: Physiological psychologist
- Known for: Pioneer in the field of brain function study
- Spouse: Ellen Ford (m. 1933)
- Father: Benjamin

Donald Benjamin Lindsley (December 23, 1907 – June 19, 2003) was an American physiological psychologist most known as a pioneer in the field of brain function study. Considered by his colleagues to have been worthy of winning the Nobel Prize in Physiology for discovering the reticular activating system along with Horace Winchell (Tid) Magoun and Giuseppe Moruzzi, Lindsley was instrumental in demonstrating the use of electroencephalography (EEG) in the study of brain function.

== Early life and education ==
On December 23, 1907, Lindsley was born in Brownhelm Township, Ohio, which was primarily a farming community at the time. He was the youngest of four sons, though one of his siblings did not survive infancy. Lindsley's father, Benjamin, worked as a parts manager for the Cleveland Stone Company. Throughout his high school years, Lindsley excelled as an athlete, earning medals and titles in track, baseball, and basketball. He lived a simple, small-town country life, spending his summers fishing and hunting, and his winters pursuing these outdoor activities. Additionally, he played the trumpet, which helped finance his passage on a cruise ship to Europe. Initially, he did not harbor aspirations of attending college, as no one in his family had pursued higher education before, and the financial burden seemed insurmountable. However through the encouragement of one of his teachers, he pursued a higher education deciding he would work his way through college. His commitment to the field of psychology began at Wittenberg College in 1925.

Lindsley attended Wittenberg College (now University) in 1925-1929. He received his PhD in psychology from the University of Iowa under a scholarship and studied under Lee Edward Travis. It was at the University of Iowa that he met his wife, Ellen Ford. She was a theater arts major and the daughter of Arthur Ford, a professor of electrical engineering at the University of Iowa. They later married in 1933 and were married for sixty-two years. It was at the University of Iowa that Lindsley mastered the use of lab equipment and physiology, publishing six papers on human and rat muscle activity.

== Activation theory and Ascending reticular system ==
In 1945, Lindsley undertook basic neurophysiological research with Horace Winchell Mangoun at the Northwestern Medical School in downtown Chicago. The 19th century prevailing theory of sleep and waking stated that brain organization and behavior was based on a sensory-motor schema. The waking state was thought to be supported by sensory input while sleep was conceived as the product of sensory withdrawal. This theory was reasonable and unchallenged at the time as there was no knowledge of another major type of system in the brain beyond sensory and motor systems.

In 1949, Mangoun and visiting scientist, Giuseppe Moruzzi from the University of Pisa, challenged this theory when they accidentally discovered a new type of brain system while experimenting with spinal reflexes on an anesthetized cat. This brain system's existence had not yet been suspected. This research was argued by proponents until Lindsley led a team to perform the experiments that established the validity to this new system, the ascending reticular activating system and came up with Activation theory. It postulated that there is an arousal continuum on which significantly lower emotion at one extreme and intense emotion at the other can be located through EEG from the reticular substance and thus concluded an organism is in a continuous state of emotional flux related to the state and environment they habituate.

== Awards ==
1. Scholarship to University of Iowa
2. National Research Council Fellowship 1933–1935 at Harvard Medical School
3. First EEG publication 1936
4. First in utero recordings of the EEG and EKG, as early as the fifth month, 1938
5. Election to the Society for Experimental Psychologists, 1942
6. Presidential Certificate of Merit for WWII effort, 1948
7. National Academy of Sciences, 1952
8. Distinguished Scientific Contribution Award, A.P.A., 1959
9. Professorship at Northwestern University
10. Sleep waking theory published in 1949- validity of Ascending Reticular Activating System
11. Co-founded Brain Research Institute at UCLA, 1961
12. Election to the American Academy of Arts and Sciences, 1965
13. Ralph Gerard Prize for distinguished contributions to Neuroscience, Society for Neuroscience, 1988
14. Obituary of Lee Edward Travis, 1989
15. Handbook of Experimental Psychology, Chapter on Emotion, 1951
16. Honorary degrees from Brown University, Trinity College, Loyola University, Johannes Gutenberg University
17. 50 students received their doctorates under Lindsley and 70 post-doctorates

== Contributions ==
Lindsley was one of the first in his field to utilize electroencephalography (EEG) to record brain activity. He developed a means for measuring human sensory processing and rapid electrical changes in the brain. He contributed to understanding wakefulness and arousal in relation to brainstem activating systems. He developed an interdisciplinary approach to researching the psychological variables associated with the reticular activating system He even developed a film, Psychologists Here, There, and Everywhere, a moving-picture record of hundreds of scientists in action at the annual professional meetings of the American Psychological Association from 1946 to 1957.
