= Mabel Farrington Gifford =

American speech therapist and lecturer

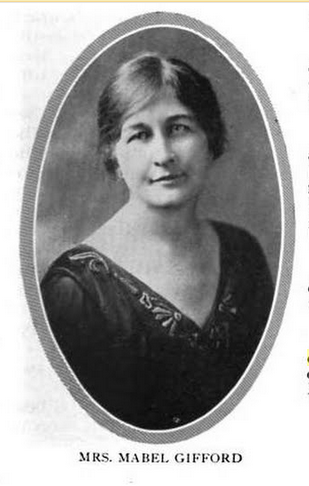
Mabel Farrington Gifford, in a 1922 publication.

Mabel Farrington Gifford (August 19, 1880 – May 1, 1962) was an American speech therapist and lecturer, an expert on stuttering and other speech disorders. She was director of the Speech Clinic at the University of California at Berkeley for 25 years.

== Early life ==
Mabel Farrington Gifford was born in Winona, Minnesota. She stuttered in childhood, and finished high school at age 20, in Pomona, California. She attended the Corrective Speech Institute in Buffalo, New York, and studied with H. G. Brainard, a neurologist in Los Angeles. Speech was a family interest: her brother Guy Stevens Farrington was on the faculty at Stanford University, also lecturing on speech disorders, and his wife Alice was an actress known for giving dramatic recitations, who also taught public speaking.

== Career ==
Gifford's work focused on early intervention for speech disorders, with expert services offered through the public schools. She developed California's first teacher training program for identifying and managing speech disorders in the classroom. Gifford was on the faculty of the Special Education department at San Francisco State Teachers College, and director of the Speech Clinic at the University of California from 1915 to 1940. She demonstrated her techniques at the Panama-Pacific Exposition in 1915. After World War I, she worked with returning veterans on speech rehabilitation. In 1925, she was appointed Assistant State Superintendent of Public Instruction.

Gifford was president of the Speech Arts Association of California in 1922, and was a founding member of the American Speech and Hearing Association (ASHA) in 1926. and From 1926 she was director of the Bureau of Correction of Speech Defects in the California Department of Education. She also served as president of the Western Speech Association in 1949.

Among her published writings were Speech Defects and Disorders and their Correction (1926), How to Overcome Stammering (1940), Correcting Nervous Speech Disorders (1940), and Speech Correction in the Elementary School (1948).

== Personal life ==
Gifford retired in 1952. She died ten years later, in Long Beach, California, aged 81 years.
