= American Speech–Language–Hearing Association =

Professional organization

American Speech-Language-Hearing Association
- Formation: December 1925; 100 years ago (as American Academy of Speech Correction); Iowa City, Iowa, U.S.
- Headquarters: 2200 Research Boulevard; Rockville, Maryland, U.S.
- Chief Executive Officer: Vicki R. Deal-Williams
- Website: www.asha.org

The American Speech–Language–Hearing Association (ASHA) is a professional association for speech–language pathologists, audiologists, and speech, language, and hearing scientists in the United States and internationally. The association reported over 234,000 members and affiliates in its 2023 report.

The association's national office is located at 2200 Research Boulevard, Rockville, Maryland. The organization also has an office on Capitol Hill.

As of January 2022, Vicki R. Deal-Williams serves as the association's chief executive officer.

== History ==
ASHA was founded in 1925 as the American Academy of Speech Correction in the home of Lee Edward Travis in Iowa City, Iowa.

The charter members were Margaret Gray Blanton, Smiley Blanton, Richard Carmen Borden, Frederick Warner Brown, Mary A Brownell, Alvin Clayton Busse, Pauline Beatrice Camp, Jane Dorsey (Zimmerman), Eudora Porter Estabrook, Mabel Farrington Gifford, Max Aaron Goldstein, Ruth Green, Laura Heilman, Elmer Lawton Kenyon, Mabel V Lacey, Elizabeth Dickinson McDowell, Thyrza Nichols, Samuel Dowse Robbins, Sara Mae Stinchfield (Hawk), Jane Bliss Taylor, Charles Kenneth Thomas, Lee Edward Travis, Lavilla Amelia Ward, Sina Fladeland Waterhouse, and Robert William West.

In 1927, they changed their name to American Society for the Study of Disorders of Speech, in 1934 to the American Speech Correction Association, in 1947 to the American Speech and Hearing Association. The current name was adopted in 1978.

== Council for Academic Accreditation ==
The Council for Academic Accreditation in Audiology and Speech–Language Pathology (CAA) is the accreditation unit of the ASHA. Founded over 100 years ago by American universities and secondary schools, CAA established standards for graduate program accreditation that meet entry-level preparation in the speech and hearing field. Accreditation is available for graduate programs with a master's degree in Speech–Language Pathology or clinical doctoral program in audiology.

== Membership ==
Professionals of Communication Sciences and Disorders (CSD) can become members of ASHA. These professionals include audiologists, speech-language pathologists, and speech-language-hearing scientists. As of December 31, 2023, the organization reports more than 234,000 members and affiliates. ASHA also sponsors various special interest groups for its members.
