= Wauneta, Nebraska =

- Village
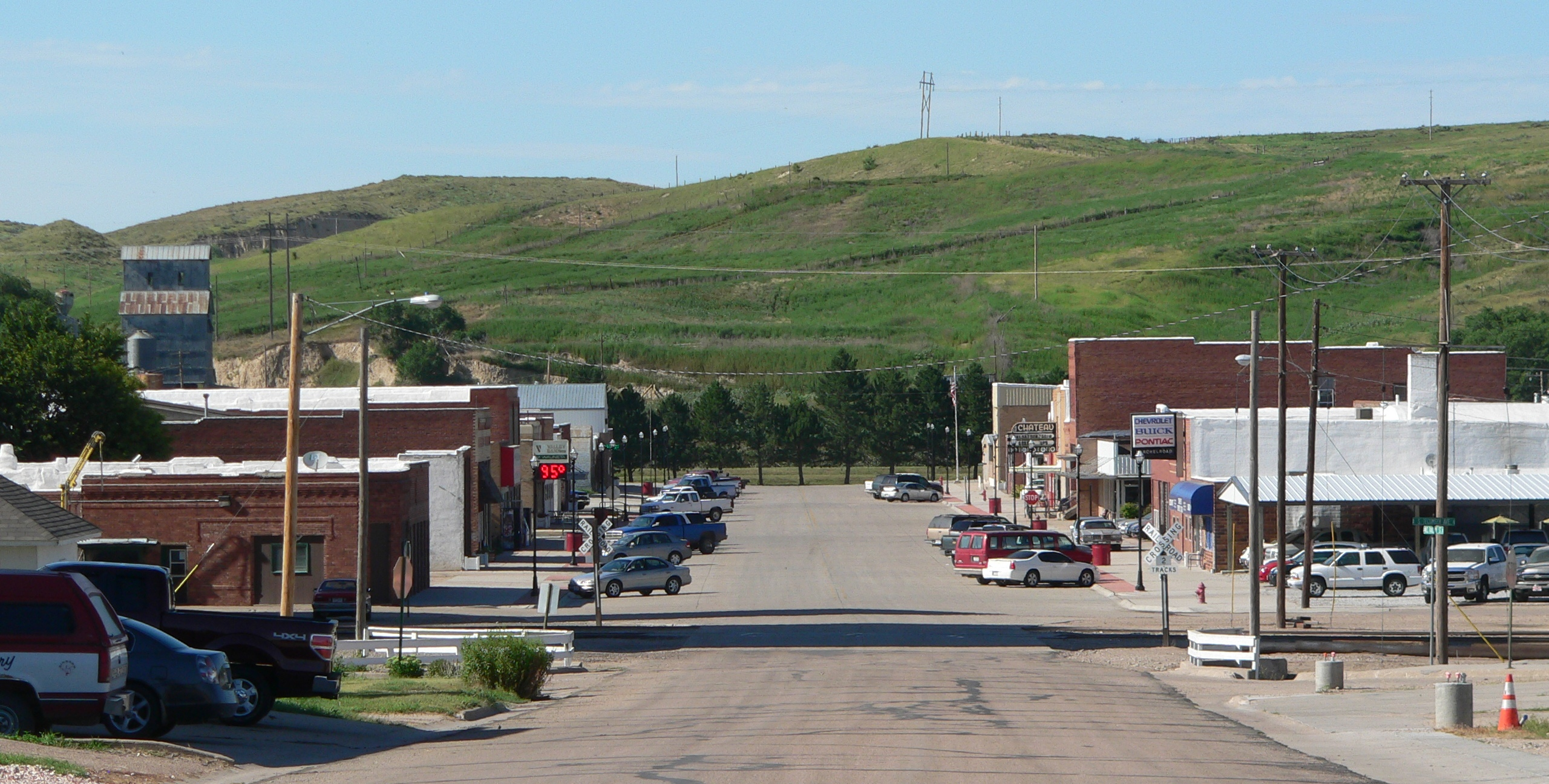
- Downtown Wauneta: Tecumseh Avenue, looking north

- Location of Wauneta, Nebraska
- Coordinates: 40°25′01″N 101°22′10″W
- Country: United States
- State: Nebraska
- County: Chase

Area
  - Total: 0.97 sq mi (2.51 km^{2})
  - Land: 0.97 sq mi (2.51 km^{2})
  - Water: 0 sq mi (0.00 km^{2})
- Elevation: 2,959 ft (902 m)

Population (2020)
  - Total: 549
  - Density: 566.7/sq mi (218.81/km^{2})
- Time zone: UTC-7 (Mountain (MST))
  - Summer (DST): UTC-6 (MDT)
- ZIP code: 69045
- Area code: 308
- FIPS code: 31-51700
- GNIS feature ID: 2400109
- Website: wauneta.com

Wauneta is a village in Chase County, Nebraska, United States. As of the 2020 census, Wauneta had a population of 549. It lies along U.S. Route 6, southeast of the city of Imperial, the county seat of Chase County. Its elevation is 2,942 feet (897 m). Wauneta's ZIP code is 69045.

== History ==
The first white settlers at Wauneta were George Rowley and his wife who built a sod house at the Wauneta Falls in 1875. The first post office was established in 1877. A post office has continuously served Wauneta since 1886. “The Wauneta Breeze” newspaper served the community for more than 130 years. Its first edition was printed on January 17, 1887, by a young New Yorker named John Hann. The newspaper printed its final issue on November 12, 2020, and merged with The Imperial Republican.

The railroad reached Wauneta in 1892. This line was built by a division of the Chicago, Burlington and Quincy Railroad. This line left the main line near Culbertson and terminated in Imperial.

=== National Register of Historic Places listings ===
- Wauneta Roller Mills (listed 2008)
- Lovett Site (listed 1972) is northwest of Wauneta

== Geography ==
According to the United States Census Bureau, the village has a total area of 0.97 square miles (2.51 km^{2}), all land.

== Demographics ==
Historical population
Census	Pop.	Note	%±
1900	181		—
1910	327		80.7%
1920	572		74.9%
1930	793		38.6%
1940	770		−2.9%
1950	926		20.3%
1960	794		−14.3%
1970	738		−7.1%
1980	746		1.1%
1990	675		−9.5%
2000	625		−7.4%
2010	577		−7.7%
2020	549		−4.9%
U.S. Decennial Census

=== 2010 census ===
As of the census of 2010, there were 577 people, 269 households, and 150 families residing in the village. The population density was 594.8 inhabitants per square mile (229.7/km^{2}). There were 307 housing units at an average density of 316.5 per square mile (122.2/km^{2}). The racial makeup of the village was 95.7% White, 0.2% African American, 0.2% Asian, 3.5% from other races, and 0.5% from two or more races. Hispanic or Latino of any race were 6.6% of the population.

There were 269 households, of which 21.6% had children under the age of 18 living with them, 46.8% were married couples living together, 6.3% had a female householder with no husband present, 2.6% had a male householder with no wife present, and 44.2% were non-families. 39.8% of all households were made up of individuals, and 21.2% had someone living alone who was 65 years of age or older. The average household size was 2.03 and the average family size was 2.72.

The median age in the village was 50.4 years. 18.7% of residents were under the age of 18; 5.8% were between the ages of 18 and 24; 17.9% were from 25 to 44; 24.9% were from 45 to 64; and 32.6% were 65 years of age or older. The gender makeup of the village was 46.1% male and 53.9% female.

=== 2000 census ===
As of the census of 2000, there were 625 people, 280 households, and 180 families residing in the village. The population density was 817.4 inhabitants per square mile (315.6/km^{2}). There were 325 housing units at an average density of 425.1 per square mile (164.1/km^{2}). The racial makeup of the village was 96.16% White, 0.16% Black or African American, none Native American, 0.48% Asian, 0.16% Pacific Islander, 2.72% from other races, and 0.32% from two or more races. Hispanic or Latino of any race were 2.72% of the population.

There were 280 households, out of which 23.2% had children under the age of 18 living with them, 56.1% were married couples living together, 5.7% had a female householder with no husband present, and 35.7% were non-families. 32.9% of all households were made up of individuals, and 17.5% had someone living alone who was 65 years of age or older. The average household size was 2.11 and the average family size was 2.65.

In the village, the population was spread out, with 18.6% under the age of 18, 5.1% from 18 to 24, 20.6% from 25 to 44, 21.6% from 45 to 64, and 34.1% who were 65 years of age or older. The median age was 50 years. For every 100 females, there were 89.4 males. For every 100 females age 18 and over, there were 89.9 males.

As of 2000 the median income for a household in the village was $29,813, and the median income for a family was $33,500. Males had a median income of $24,750 versus $16,932 for females. The per capita income for the village was $16,385. About 7.2% of families and 9.1% of the population were below the poverty line, including 16.8% of those under age 18 and 6.1% of those age 65 or over.
