= Champion, Nebraska =

- Census-designated place
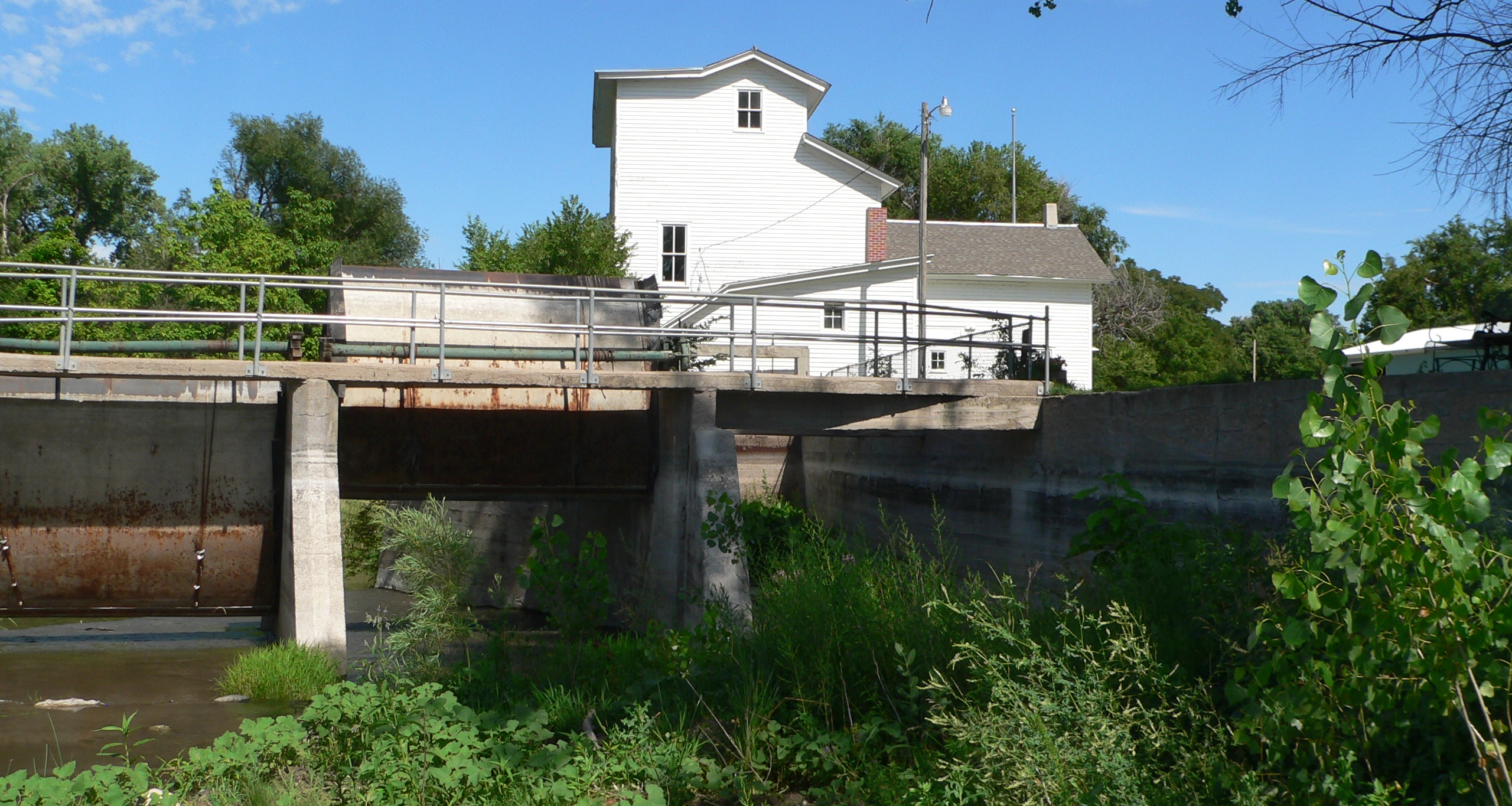
- Champion Mill and dam

- Location within the state of Nebraska
- Coordinates: 40°28′14″N 101°44′49″W
- Country: United States
- State: Nebraska
- County: Chase

Area
  - Total: 0.25 sq mi (0.64 km^{2})
  - Land: 0.24 sq mi (0.62 km^{2})
  - Water: 0.0077 sq mi (0.02 km^{2})
- Elevation: 3,265 ft (995 m)

Population (2020)
  - Total: 115
  - Density: 481/sq mi (185.6/km^{2})
- Time zone: UTC-7 (Mountain (MST))
  - Summer (DST): UTC-6 (MDT)
- ZIP codes: 69023
- FIPS code: 31-08745
- GNIS feature ID: 2583878

Champion is an unincorporated community and census-designated place in central Chase County, Nebraska, United States. As of the 2020 census, Champion had a population of 115. It has a post office with the ZIP code 69023.

== History ==
Champion was named for Champion S. Chase, a Nebraska politician.

== Geography ==
Champion lies in the valley of Frenchman Creek, a tributary of the Republican River, near the Champion Mill Park, 7 miles (11 km) southwest of the city of Imperial, the county seat of Chase County.

== Demographics ==
Historical population
Census	Pop.	Note	%±
2020	115		—
U.S. Decennial Census
