= Frenchman Creek (Republican River tributary) =

River in Colorado and Nebraska, U.S.

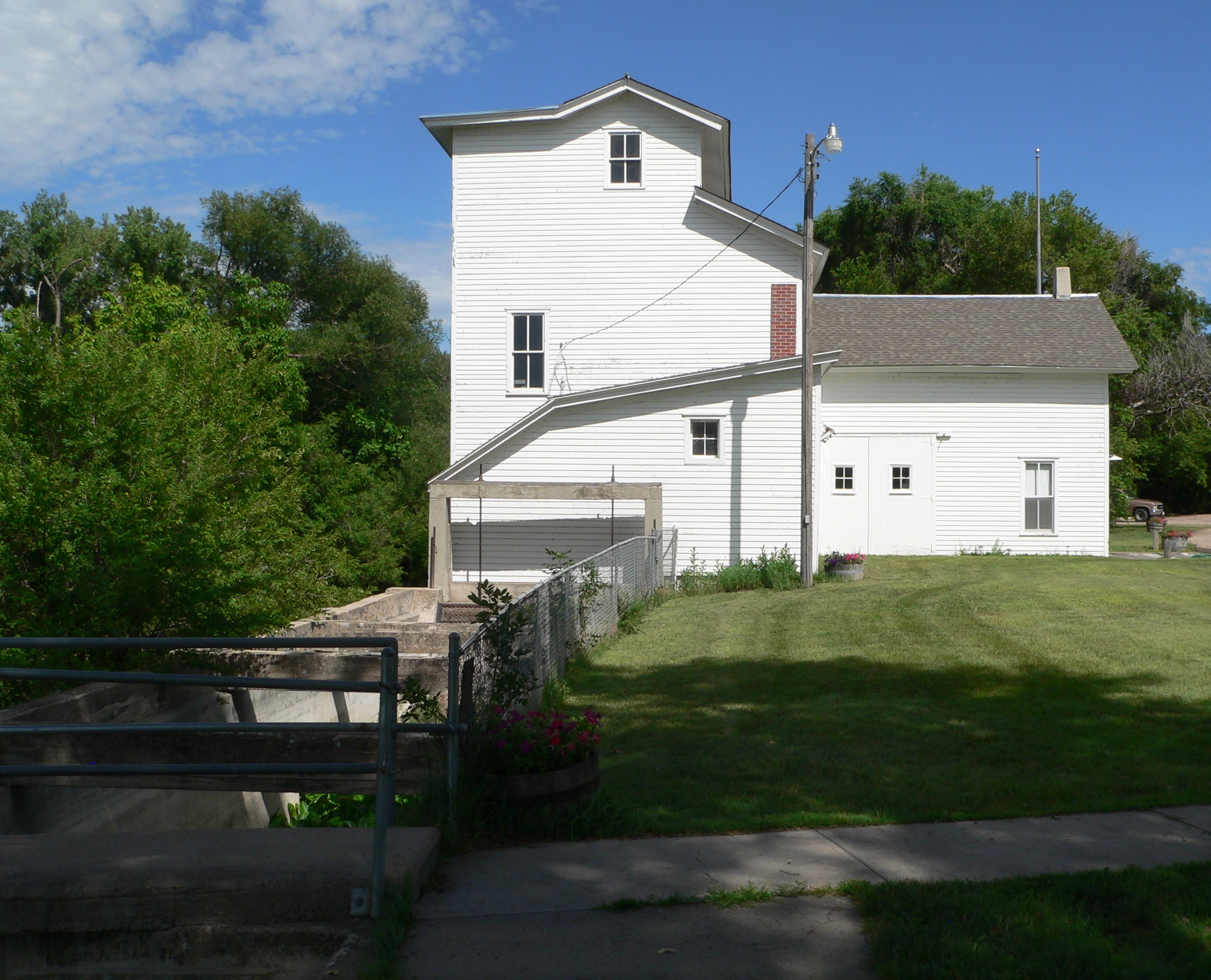
- Champion Mill on Frenchman Creek

Physical characteristics
- Source
  - coordinates: 40°35′15″N 102°18′57″W
- Mouth
  - location: Confluence with Republican
  - coordinates: 40°13′29″N 100°49′36″W
  - elevation: 2,562 ft (781 m)
- Length: 166 mi (267 km)

Basin features
- Progression: Republican—Kansas— Missouri—Mississippi

Frenchman Creek, is a spring-fed waterway that begins in Phillips County, Colorado, crosses Chase and Hayes counties in Nebraska and ends at its juncture with the Republican River in Hitchcock County, Nebraska. The length of the waterway is approximately 166 miles (267 km).

== History ==
Various mills and irrigation works have been built on Frenchman Creek. A 100 barrel roller mill was built on the east side of the falls in Wauneta in 1887 by Blair and Polly.

In 1888, Champion Mill was built on the Frenchman in the community of Champion by Thomas Scott; it operated commercially, grinding flour and feed grain, from 1888 to 1968. The last functional water-powered mill in Nebraska, it was purchased by the Nebraska Game and Parks Commission in 1969 and is preserved as a state historical park.

Frenchman Creek flows into Enders Reservoir near the village of Enders, Nebraska . Enders Dam was built in 1947-1951 as part of the Missouri Basin Program of the Bureau of Reclamation. Water stored at Enders is diverted into the Frenchman-Cambridge Irrigation district. Enders Reservoir State Recreation Area is a popular location for fishing, hunting and other outdoor recreation activities.

Flows in the Frenchman, and associated releases from Enders Reservoir, have declined over the years. The primary cause is believed to be the lowering of water table levels due to groundwater irrigation in the Frenchman Basin. This has reduced the flows of springs that have historically fed the creek. In order to maintain the recreational and wildlife environments on the reservoir, irrigation releases were halted after 2002.

== Name ==
Frenchman Creek was historically known as Frenchman's Fork and Whiteman's Fork, both in reference to a Frenchman who was an early settler in the area. Frenchman Creek is also sometimes referred to as the Frenchman River.

== See also ==
- List of rivers of Colorado
- List of rivers of Nebraska
