= Frederick Harold Stinchfield =

American lawyer

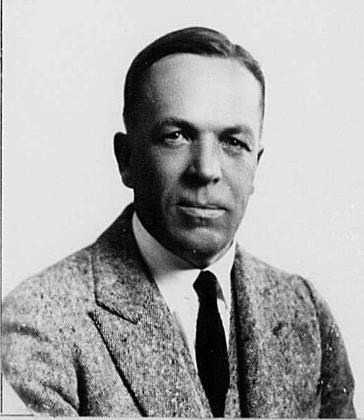
Frederick Harold Stinchfield

Frederick Harold Stinchfield (May 8, 1881 – January 15, 1950) was an American attorney and former president of the American Bar Association (ABA). Stinchfield graduated from Harvard Law School in 1905. In the same year he passed the New York State bar exam and began his law career. During World War I, Stinchfield served as a major in the Judge Advocate's Program. Stinchfield served as president of the ABA from 1936 to 1937.

Stinchfield was most remembered for his ardent stance again President Franklin D. Roosevelt's Judicial Procedures Reform Bill of 1937, commonly referred to as "court packing". He wrote several editorial pieces on behalf of the Bar Association denouncing the bill, and used President George Washington's farewell address warning of encroachment on the federal system as a baseline for his arguments.
