= Sara Mae Stinchfield Hawk =

American speech pathologist

- Born: 1885
- Died: 1977 (aged 91–92)

Sara Mae Stinchfield Hawk (1885–1977) was the first person in America to receive a Ph.D. for Speech-Pathology and co-founded the American Speech and Hearing Association (ASHA) in 1925. Over her career as a scholar and speech therapist she wrote several books on the subject.

== Personal life ==
Sara Mae Stinchfield Hawk was born in Auburn, Maine in 1885. She was the oldest of three children and had a sister named Nellie and a brother named Paul. Sara Mae Stinchfield Hawk married Charles Lye Hawk when she was fifty years old. They did not have children of their own, but they took in their nieces and nephews when their siblings died.

In 1909, Hawk received her diploma from the Curry School of Expression in Boston. In 1914, she received her bachelor's degree from the University of Pittsburgh. In 1920, she received her master's degree from the University of Iowa. In 1922, Hawk received her Ph.D. in Speech Pathology from the University of Wisconsin. She also studied with Freud.

== Career ==
After earning her Ph.D., Sara Mae Stinchfield Hawk became a professor at Mount Holyoke College in Massachusetts. She then moved to California and taught at many schools including the University of Southern California, Scripps, University of California, Berkeley, and the University of California, Los Angeles. Most of her career was spent teaching at colleges and universities and she encouraged schools to develop classes in speech and hearing. On top of teaching, Hawk worked as the Director of Speech Clinic at the Orthopedic Hospital of Los Angeles and also at the John Tracy Clinic in Los Angeles.

In 1925, Sara Mae Stinchfield Hawk, along with twenty-four other people, founded ASHA. She served as the secretary of ASHA from 1925–1930. She was the chair of the membership committee in 1932. She was a member of the nomenclature committee from 1939–1940. Hawk was also the ASHA president from 1930–1940. She became an honorary life member in 1950 and received the association's highest honor in 1953.
