= Warren Prall Watters =

Warren Prall Watters (November 24, 1890 – June 15, 1992) was the founding archbishop of the Free Church of Antioch (Malabar Rite), one of several Independent Catholic Churches in the United States.

== Biography ==
Watters was born in Imperial, Nebraska in 1890. He was an accomplished musician and concert pianist and was educated at Grinnell, Northwestern, Drake, and the University of California. He later did post-graduate doctoral work at the Conservatory of Music in Paris.

Watters was deeply interested in esoteric spiritualities and was for many years a member of the Theosophical Society and of its Esoteric School. He was ordained priest in Chicago, Illinois in June, 1927, by Bishop Edwin Burt Beckwith of the Liberal Catholic Church. Following his ordination, he served in the Liberal Catholic Church of Omaha, Nebraska, under Bishop Eklund, a charge he held for 17 years. In 1967, Watters was appointed Vicar General of the International Liberal Catholic Church and became bishop-elect in that church in 1970.

He was drawn to the Catholic Apostolic Church of Antioch because of its willingness to ordain women. He was consecrated to the episcopate of the Catholic Apostolic Church of Antioch-Malabar Rite at Trinity Church in Santa Barbara, California on April 28, 1973, by Bishop Herman Adrian Spruit who was assisted by co-consecrators Bishop Stephan A. Hoeller and Jay Davis Kirby. Watters was assigned as Bishop of California for the Church of Antioch and served as co-pastor of the Holy Spirit Church of Antioch in Santa Barbara. During this time he also founded the Center for Esoteric Studies and published the Esoteric Review magazine.

Organizational changes within Church of Antioch led to Watters and several other bishops departing to form their own separate and distinct ministries. Watters, shortly before his death, established the Free Church of Antioch (Malabar Rite). After his death, he was succeeded by his wife of many years, Ellen Watters, who became archbishop of the church. Ellen Watters was consecrated to the episcopate on April 20, 1986, by Herman Adrian Spruit who was assisted by co-consecrators Meri Louise Spruit and Joseph L. Vrendenburgh. Ellen Watters died in 2002.
