= Cathedral Valley Corral =

- U.S. National Register of Historic Places
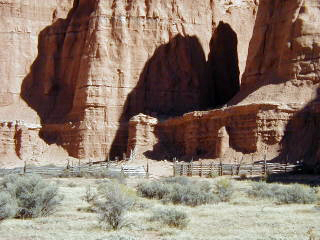

- Location within Utah Location within the United States
- Nearest city: Torrey, Utah
- Coordinates: 38°29′5″N 111°20′58″W
- Area: 0.5 acres (0.20 ha)
- Built: 1900
- MPS: Capitol Reef National Park MPS
- NRHP reference No.: 99001093
- Added to NRHP: September 13, 1999

The Cathedral Valley Corral was constructed around 1900 by local cattlemen in the northern portion of what is now Capitol Reef National Park in Utah. It is one of the oldest examples of ranching use in the park. It coincided with a change in the use of the land, where cattle were grazed on the open range and collected into corrals for branding, vaccination and other procedures. The extensive use of open-range grazing practices led to the de-vegetation of portions of the area. The corral was used by the Jeffery and Morrel families. The corral site uses sandstone cliffs as part of the enclosure, with a wood fence closing off an alcove in a cliff. The pen is subdivided into a larger and smaller enclosure, with a cattle chute off the small pen.

The Cathedral Valley Corral was listed on the National Register of Historic Places on September 13, 1999.
