= Lesley Morrell Line Cabin and Corral =

- U.S. National Register of Historic Places
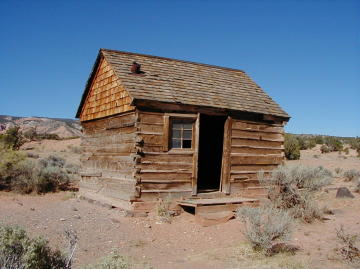

- Location within Utah Location within the United States
- Nearest city: Torrey, Utah
- Coordinates: 38°29′2″N 111°21′55″W
- Area: 0.1 acres (0.040 ha)
- Built: 1935
- Built by: Paul Christensen, Leslie H. Morrell
- MPS: Capitol Reef National Park MPS
- NRHP reference No.: 99001096
- Added to NRHP: September 13, 1999

The Leslie Morrell Line Cabin and Corral are located in the Cathedral Valley section of northern Capitol Reef National Park in Utah. The cabin was built in the 1920s on Lake Creek by Paul Christensen at his sawmill as a summer residence for Christensen and his family. Christensen sold the cabin to Leslie H. Morrell around 1935, who took the cabin apart and rebuilt it at its present site for use as a winter camp for cowboys on the Morrell ranch. The use continued until 1970 when the area was sold to the National Park Service. It is one of the best-preserved relics of ranching activities in the park.

The cabin was listed on the National Register of Historic Places on September 13, 1999.
