= Texas Trail Stone Corral =

- U.S. National Register of Historic Places
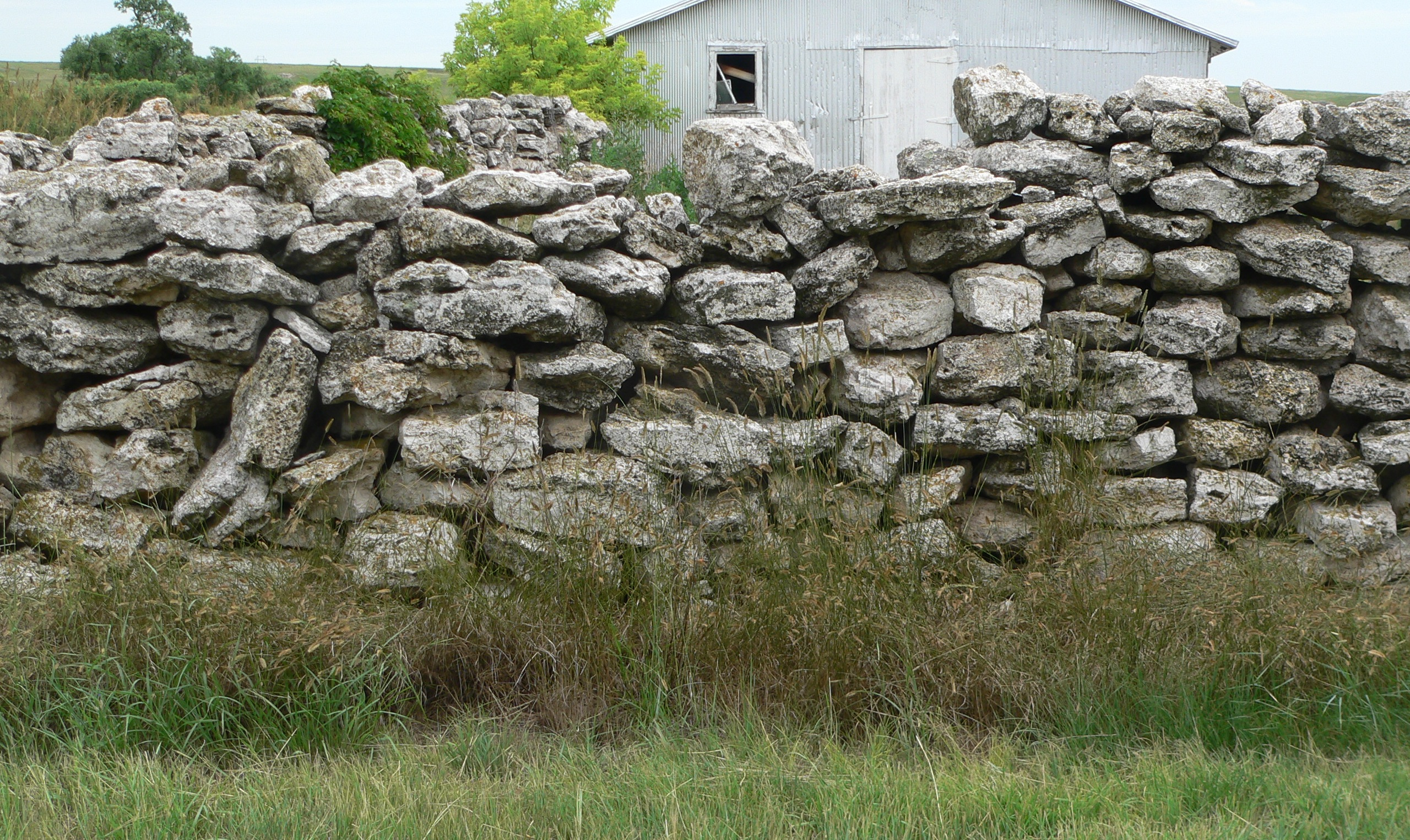

- Location within Nebraska Location within the United States
- Location: Nebraska Highway 61 north of Imperial
- Nearest city: Imperial, Nebraska
- Area: 2 acres (0.81 ha)
- Built: 1876
- Built by: Webster, Thomas B.
- Architectural style: Corral
- NRHP reference No.: 02001478
- Added to NRHP: December 9, 2002

The Texas Trail Stone Corral, near Imperial, Nebraska, was built in 1874 and is a rare surviving artifact of cattle drives along the Texas Trail. It is listed on the National Register of Historic Places and as a Nebraska historic resource, NeHBS no. CH00-041.

The site has two surviving walls of a c. 1876 dry stone corral. It is on a property that was once a 640-acre ranch property. Two other walls were removed in 1940 for the stones to be used in a different wall.

It was listed on the National Register of Historic Places in 2002.
