= Pen (enclosure) =

Enclosure for holding animals such as livestock or pets

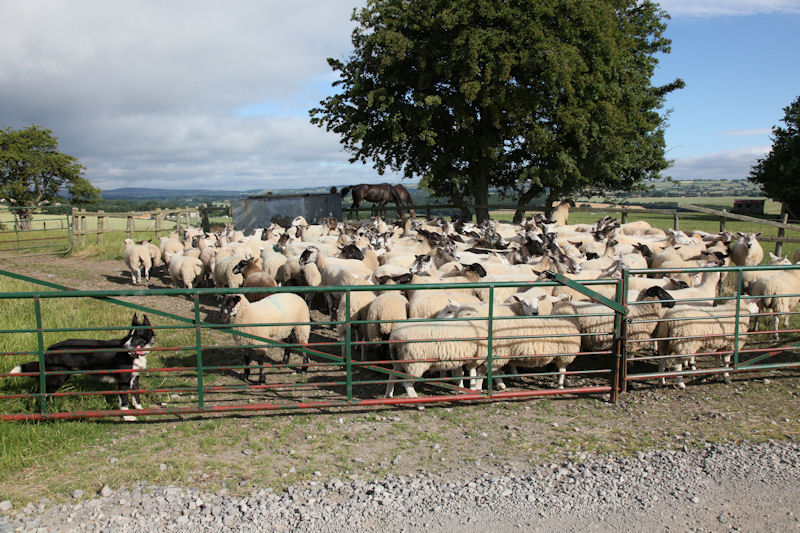
Sheep in a pen, in Yorkshire, England

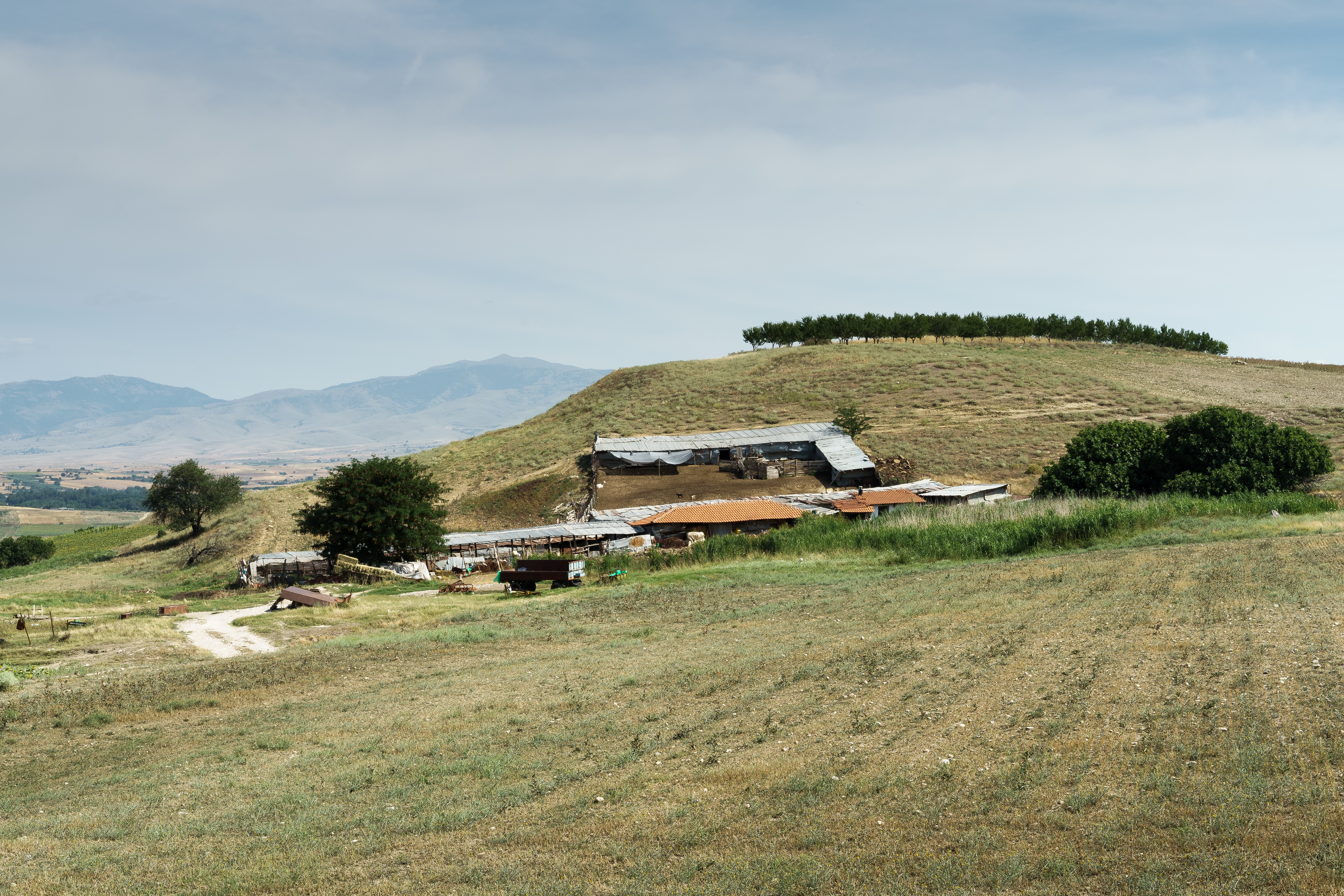
Pen for goats in Macedonia

A pen is a fenced/walled open-air enclosure for holding land animals in captivity, typically for livestock but may also be used for holding other domesticated animals such as pets that are unwanted inside buildings. The term describes types of enclosures that may confine one or many animals. Construction and terminology vary depending on the region of the world, purpose, animal species to be confined, local materials used and tradition. Pen or penning as a verb refers to the act of confining animals in an enclosure.

Similar terms are kraal, boma, and corrals. Encyclopædia Britannica notes usage of the term "kraal" for elephant corrals in India, Sri Lanka, and Thailand.

== Australia and New Zealand ==
In Australia and New Zealand a pen is a small enclosure for livestock (especially sheep or cattle), which is part of a larger construction, e.g. calf pen, forcing pen (or yard) in sheep or cattle yards, or a sweating pen or catching pen in a shearing shed. In Australian and New Zealand English, a paddock may encompass a large, fenced grazing area of many acres, not to be confused with the American English use of paddock as interchangeable with corral or pen, describing smaller, confined areas.

== Britain ==
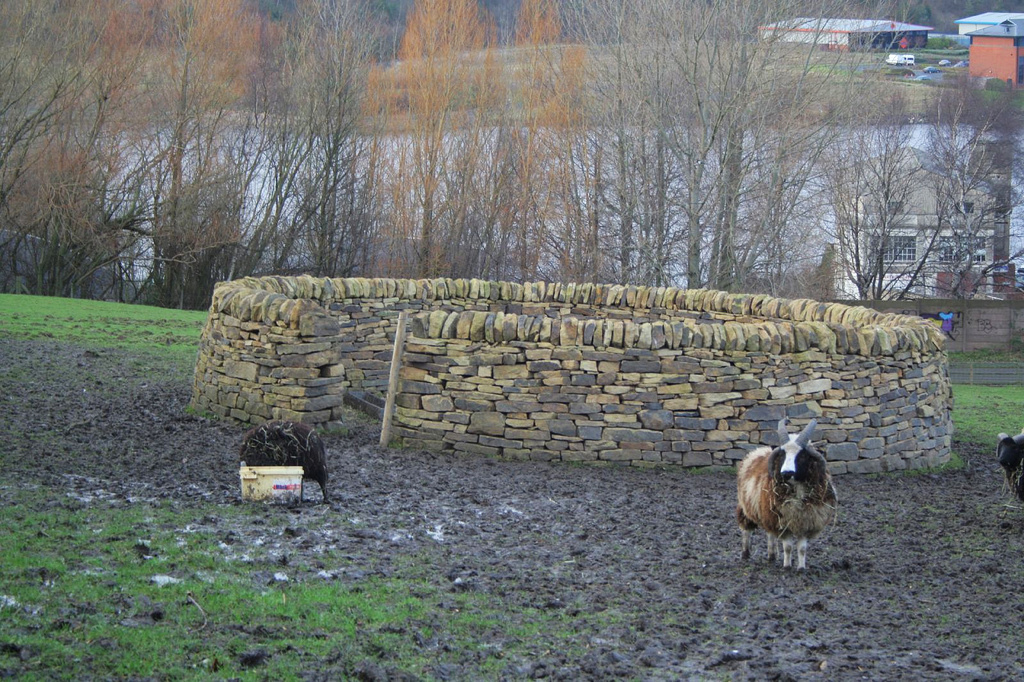
Sheep near a dry stone sheepfold, one of the oldest types of livestock enclosure

In British English, a sheep pen is also called a folding, sheepfold or sheepcote. Modern shepherds more commonly use terms such as closing or confinement pen for small sheep pens. Most structures today referred to as sheepfolds are ancient dry stone semicircles.

== India ==
Kraal term is used for an elephant enclosure, as for jailing an elephant who had injured two villagers in Kanha Tiger Reserve in 2020.

== Sri Lanka ==
Panamure was an enclosure and associated town founded in 1896 within a forest owned by Francis Molamure, where 10 roundups of wild elephants occurred, the last in 1950. The term kraal referred to the enclosure and to a roundup/hunt.

== Thailand ==
The Elephant Kraal of Ayutthaya, in Ayutthaya, a provincial capital, dates from the 1500s. The last roundup of wild elephants was in 1903.

== United States ==
In the United States, the term pen usually describes outdoor small enclosures for holding animals. These may be for encasing livestock or pets that cannot be kept indoors. Pens may be named by their purpose, such as a holding pen, used for short-term confinement. A pen for cattle may also be called a corral, a term borrowed from the Spanish language. Groups of pens that are part of a larger complex may be called a stockyard, where a series of pens hold a large number of animals, or a feedlot, which is a type of stockyard used to confine animals that are being fattened. A large pen for horses is called a paddock (Eastern US) or a corral (Western US). In some places, an exhibition arena may be called a show pen. A small pen for horses (no more than 15–20 feet on any side) is only known as a pen if it lacks any roof or shelter, otherwise, it is called a stall and is part of a stable. A large fenced grazing area of many acres is called a pasture, or, in some cases, rangeland.

=== Notable corrals ===
Several notable corrals are known in the United States, including many listed on the National Register of Historic Places, either in intact form or in ruins.

== Other regions ==
Primitive pens in South Africa are called kraals. Keddah is the term used in India for the enclosure constructed to entrap elephants, while in Sri Lanka the word employed in the same meaning is corral. In Indonesia it called kandang.

== Exercise pen ==
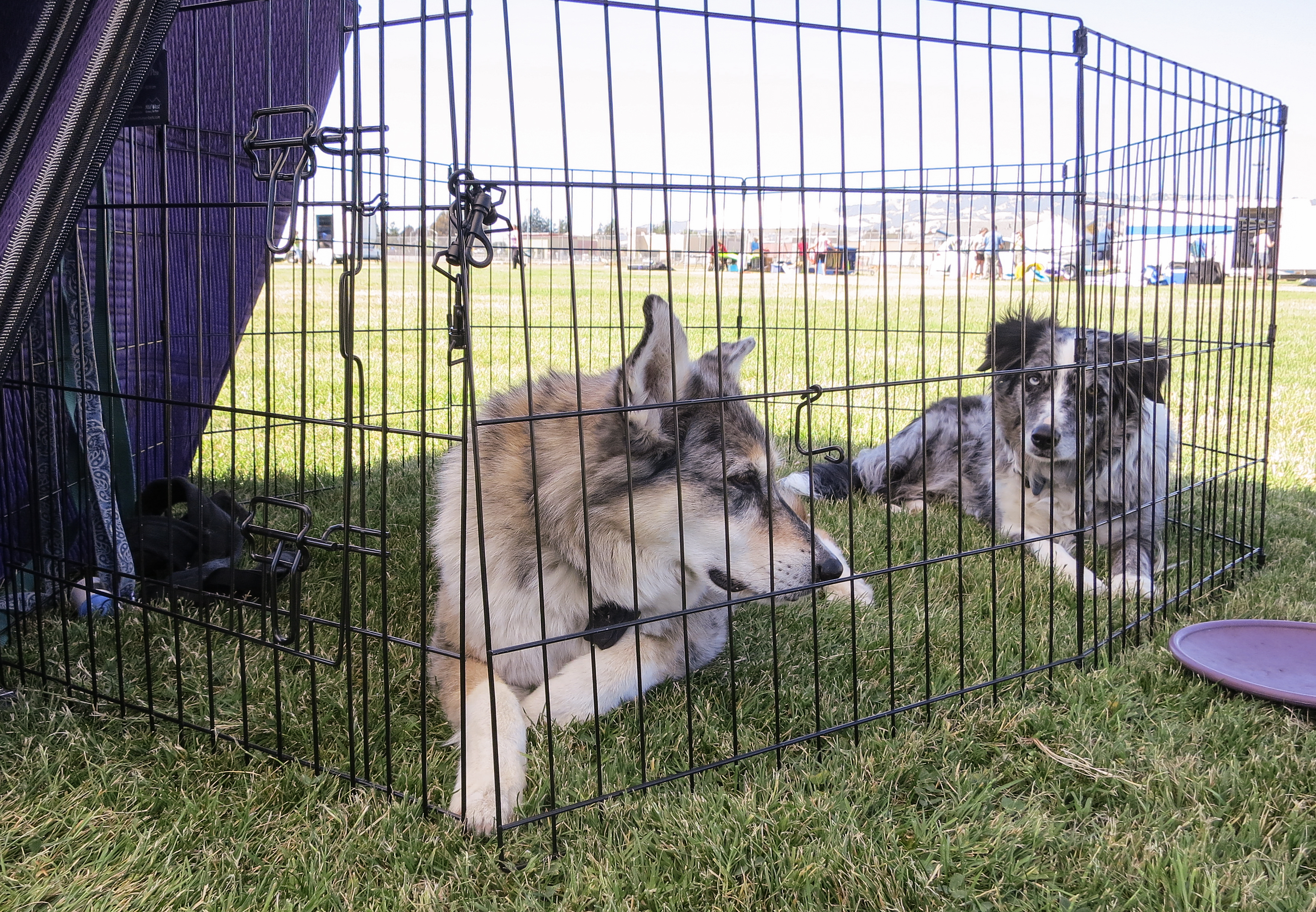
Folding portable wire exercise pen

For pets, specialized folding fencing referred to as an exercise pen, x-pen, or ex-pen, is used to surround an area, usually outdoors but not always, in which the animals can freely move around. They are commonly used for dogs, such as to give puppies or adult dogs more space than dog crates, but can also be used for rabbits and other animals. Exercise pens are usually made of sturdy wire, but can also be plastic or wood.

Horses, during training, are often exercised in a round pen, sometimes referred to as an exercise pen.

== Pen mating ==
Pen mating means that, ideally, a cohort of females is brought into the male's pen and he services them all while they are in the pen. This is the least labor-intensive mating system because the females are just left to mate at will. This mating is also the most efficient in terms of male power and efficiency as they do not need to do much in terms of exercising their power.

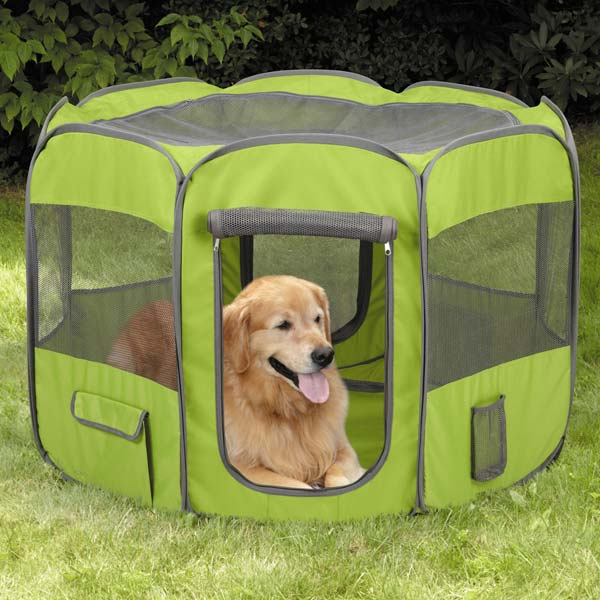
Soft-sided exercise pen

== See also ==
- Pinfold and pound (village) are synonyms of animal pound, where a poundmaster may operate
- Boô
- Kraal
- Boma (enclosure)
- Compound (enclosure)
