= Chase County, Nebraska =

County in Nebraska, United States

- County
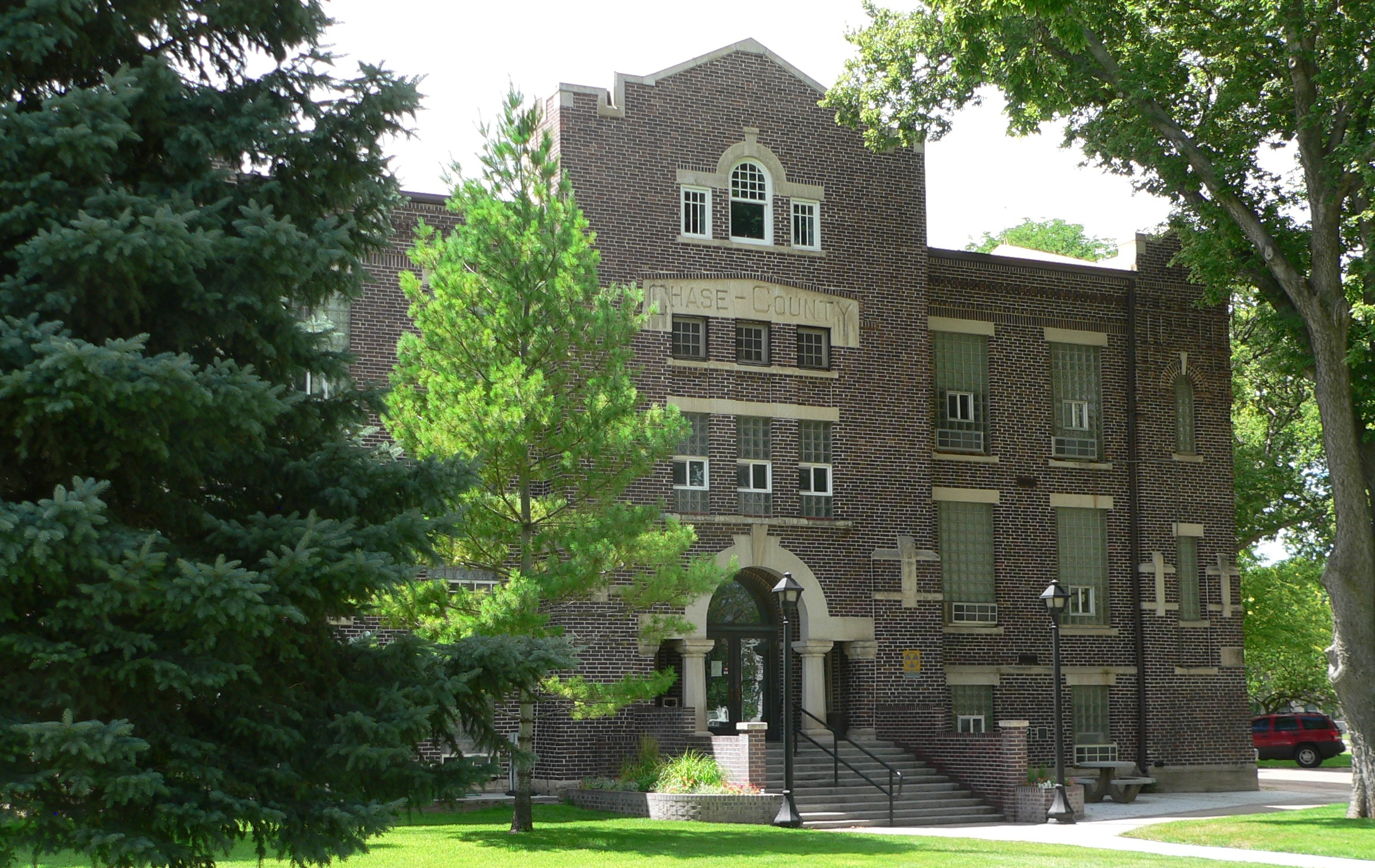
- Chase County Courthouse in Imperial

- Location within the U.S. state of Nebraska
- Coordinates: 40°32′N 101°41′W
- Country: United States
- State: Nebraska
- Founded: February 27, 1873 (authorized); 1886 (organized)
- Named for: Champion S. Chase
- Seat: Imperial
- Largest city: Imperial

Area
  - Total: 897 sq mi (2,320 km^{2})
  - Land: 894 sq mi (2,320 km^{2})
  - Water: 3.1 sq mi (8.0 km^{2}) 0.5%

Population (2020)
  - Total: 3,893
  - Estimate (2025): 3,718 ▼
  - Density: 4.35/sq mi (1.68/km^{2})
- Time zone: UTC−7 (Mountain)
  - Summer (DST): UTC−6 (MDT)
- Congressional district: 3rd
- Website: chasecounty.nebraska.gov

Chase County is a county in the U.S. state of Nebraska. As of the 2020 United States census, the population was 3,893. Its county seat is Imperial.

In the Nebraska license plate system, Chase County is represented by the prefix 72 (it had the 72nd-most vehicles registered in the state when the license plate system was established in 1922).

== History ==
Chase County was named after Champion S. Chase, who served as mayor of Omaha for seven years and was Nebraska's first Attorney General.

Chase County was separated from Hayes County by the Nebraska legislature on February 27, 1873, although the county was not organized until 1886.

It was once said that, excluding ranch owners, their wives, and their cooks, at the time Chase County was organized it was populated entirely by cowboys. Part of the reason for such a statement may have been the fact that at one time Frenchman Creek and its main branch the Stinking Water Creek were used as watering stops for cattle drives that traveled from Texas to the Union Pacific railhead at Ogallala. These trails are known as the Western or Great Western trails.

Chase County sits in the region once referred to as the Great American Desert. However, on the broad, fertile plateau, early settlers quickly discovered that Chase County's dark sandy loam soil was excellent for farming.

The railroad came to Chase County in 1892, reaching Wauneta on January 28. It was built by a division of the Chicago, Burlington and Quincy Railroad. This line left the main line near Culbertson and terminated in Imperial.

=== National Register of Historic Places listings ===
- Imperial
  - Balcony House (listed 2000)
  - Chase County Court House (listed 1990)
- Wauneta
  - Wauneta Roller Mills (listed 2008)
- Champion
  - Champion Mill (listed 1988)
- Rural Areas
  - Lovett Site (listed 1972)
  - Texas Trail Stone Corral (listed 2002), on Spring Creek North of Imperial

== Law and government ==
Chase County is served by a three-member Board of Commissioners. County officials are directly elected. It is a part of the 44th Legislative District of the Nebraska Legislature.

== Geography ==
Chase County is on the west edge of Nebraska. Its west boundary line abuts the east boundary line of the state of Colorado. According to the US Census Bureau, the county has a total area of 897 square miles (2,320 km^{2}), of which 894 square miles (2,320 km^{2}) is land and 3.1 square miles (8.0 km^{2}) (0.3%) is water.

Chase County is geographically diverse. The spring-fed Frenchman Creek crosses the county from west to southeast. From Enders to Wauneta the path of the creek exposes limestone outcroppings. North of Wauneta is an area of significant loess deposits, including the typical steep-walled canyons. Rolling Sandhill formations are found in the north-central and southwestern areas of the county.

The Pierre Shale of Upper Cretaceous Age is the underlying structure of the region. At Enders Dam this formation is found at a depth of 175 feet (53 m) below the valley floor. The Ogallala Formation of Pliocene Age overlies the Pierre Shale. The Ogallala Formation is composed of fine to coarse sand, some gravel, calcareous silt, silty sands, silts and clays. Various degrees of calcareous cementation occur, resulting in lenses of varying loose unconsolidated to very firm compact materials at irregular intervals. The Ogallala beds lie almost horizontal and structural irregularities, such as faulting, have been observed in the area.

The Ogallala Formation is of vital importance to the county and the surrounding areas. The associated Ogallala Aquifer is the primary source of water for the population and livestock, and an important input into agricultural economy of the county.

=== Adjacent counties ===
- Hayes County – east
- Dundy County – south
- Yuma County, Colorado – southwest
- Phillips County, Colorado – west
- Perkins County – north

=== Protected areas ===
- Church Grove Recreation Area
- Enders Reservoir State Recreation Area

== Demographics ==
Historical population
Census	Pop.	Note	%±
1880	70		—
1890	4,807		6,767.1%
1900	2,559		−46.8%
1910	3,613		41.2%
1920	4,939		36.7%
1930	5,484		11.0%
1940	5,310		−3.2%
1950	5,176		−2.5%
1960	4,317		−16.6%
1970	4,129		−4.4%
1980	4,758		15.2%
1990	4,381		−7.9%
2000	4,068		−7.1%
2010	3,966		−2.5%
2020	3,893		−1.8%
2025 (est.)	3,718	▼	−4.5%
US Decennial Census; 1790-1960 1900-1990; 1990-2000 2010

=== 2020 census ===
As of the 2020 census, the county had a population of 3,893. The median age was 43.9 years. 24.2% of residents were under the age of 18 and 23.2% of residents were 65 years of age or older. For every 100 females there were 95.5 males, and for every 100 females age 18 and over there were 95.4 males age 18 and over.

The racial makeup of the county was 85.0% White, 0.5% Black or African American, 0.2% American Indian and Alaska Native, 0.3% Asian, 0.0% Native Hawaiian and Pacific Islander, 7.6% from some other race, and 6.3% from two or more races. Hispanic or Latino residents of any race comprised 14.4% of the population.

0.0% of residents lived in urban areas, while 100.0% lived in rural areas.

There were 1,575 households in the county, of which 30.5% had children under the age of 18 living with them and 21.0% had a female householder with no spouse or partner present. About 29.4% of all households were made up of individuals and 15.5% had someone living alone who was 65 years of age or older.

There were 1,850 housing units, of which 14.9% were vacant. Among occupied housing units, 73.8% were owner-occupied and 26.2% were renter-occupied. The homeowner vacancy rate was 3.2% and the rental vacancy rate was 11.4%.

=== 2000 census ===
As of the 2000 United States census, there were 4,068 people, 1,662 households, and 1,163 families in the county. The population density was 4 people per square mile (1.5 people/km^{2}). There were 1,927 housing units at an average density of 2 units per square mile (0.77/km^{2}). The racial makeup of the county was 97.81% White, 0.17% Black or African American, 0.10% Native American, 0.17% Asian, 0.02% Pacific Islander, 1.47% from other races, and 0.25% from two or more races. 3.42% of the population were Hispanic or Latino of any race. 44.6% were of German, 13.0% American, 12.3% English and 7.1% Irish ancestry.

There were 1,662 households, out of which 30.60% had children under the age of 18 living with them, 62.10% were married couples living together, 5.50% had a female householder with no husband present, and 30.00% were non-families. 27.30% of all households were made up of individuals, and 13.80% had someone living alone who was 65 years of age or older. The average household size was 2.39 and the average family size was 2.91.

The county population contained 25.20% under the age of 18, 5.90% from 18 to 24, 23.90% from 25 to 44, 24.00% from 45 to 64, and 21.10% who were 65 years of age or older. The median age was 42 years. For every 100 females there were 96.60 males. For every 100 females age 18 and over, there were 94.80 males.

The median income for a household in the county was $32,351, and the median income for a family was $39,225. Males had a median income of $27,554 versus $17,602 for females. The per capita income for the county was $17,490. About 7.90% of families and 9.60% of the population were below the poverty line, including 10.50% of those under age 18 and 9.00% of those age 65 or over.

== Economy ==
Chase County economy is based on agriculture. A third of the county's area is under irrigation; another fourth is used for dry farming. The rest is rangeland. Wheat, corn, edible beans (pintos, kidneys and great northerns), soybeans and sugar beets are the principal crops. Livestock production is equally important in the county's economy. In 2007, sales of agricultural products exceeded $125 Million, with Corn ($96 Million) and Wheat ($11 Million) being the primary crops.

== Transportation ==
The main highway routes crossing Chase County are U.S. Route 6 which crosses east–west and Nebraska Highway 61 which crosses north–south. The county is served by the Nebraska Kansas & Colorado Railway. NKCR is an operating company of OmniTRAX. This short line operates the branch line which interchanges with the BNSF. This line enters the county near the southeastern corner passing through Wauneta and Enders, terminating at Imperial.

=== Major highways ===
- U.S. Highway 6
- Nebraska Highway 61

== Communities ==
=== City ===
- Imperial (county seat)

=== Villages ===
- Wauneta

=== Census-designated places ===
- Champion
- Enders

=== Former communities ===
- Best
- Blanche
- Chase
- Lamar, unincorporated November 5, 2024

== Notable people ==
Lee Edward Travis - psychiatrist and speech pathologist

== Politics ==
Chase County voters are strongly Republican. In no national election since 1936 has the county selected a Democratic Party candidate. In 2024, Donald Trump won the highest share of the vote ever in the county at 88.2%. Republicans also hold a significant advantage in voter registration in Chase County, with 1,902 registered Republicans compared with just 282 registered Democrats as of 2021.

United States presidential election results for Chase County, Nebraska
Year	Republican		Democratic		Third party(ies)	
Year	No.	%	No.	%	No.	%
1900	313	51.57%	274	45.14%	20	3.29%
1904	329	62.43%	111	21.06%	87	16.51%
1908	400	51.61%	338	43.61%	37	4.77%
1912	197	25.13%	262	33.42%	325	41.45%
1916	369	37.39%	551	55.83%	67	6.79%
1920	976	66.17%	414	28.07%	85	5.76%
1924	919	48.17%	570	29.87%	419	21.96%
1928	1,540	71.90%	579	27.03%	23	1.07%
1932	948	38.62%	1,408	57.35%	99	4.03%
1936	1,031	39.85%	1,493	57.71%	63	2.44%
1940	1,557	63.27%	904	36.73%	0	0.00%
1944	1,444	69.02%	648	30.98%	0	0.00%
1948	1,094	59.78%	736	40.22%	0	0.00%
1952	1,941	80.74%	463	19.26%	0	0.00%
1956	1,444	68.31%	670	31.69%	0	0.00%
1960	1,482	69.28%	657	30.72%	0	0.00%
1964	1,081	54.38%	907	45.62%	0	0.00%
1968	1,171	67.81%	363	21.02%	193	11.18%
1972	1,318	81.11%	307	18.89%	0	0.00%
1976	1,146	59.16%	725	37.43%	66	3.41%
1980	1,593	75.75%	324	15.41%	186	8.84%
1984	1,697	80.93%	368	17.55%	32	1.53%
1988	1,446	69.45%	597	28.67%	39	1.87%
1992	1,000	48.01%	398	19.11%	685	32.89%
1996	1,277	68.88%	365	19.69%	212	11.43%
2000	1,505	80.27%	306	16.32%	64	3.41%
2004	1,652	83.73%	302	15.31%	19	0.96%
2008	1,477	80.10%	341	18.49%	26	1.41%
2012	1,584	84.84%	254	13.60%	29	1.55%
2016	1,648	86.83%	171	9.01%	79	4.16%
2020	1,740	87.00%	226	11.30%	34	1.70%
2024	1,648	88.22%	204	10.92%	16	0.86%

== See also ==
- National Register of Historic Places listings in Chase County, Nebraska
