= Imperial, Nebraska =

- City
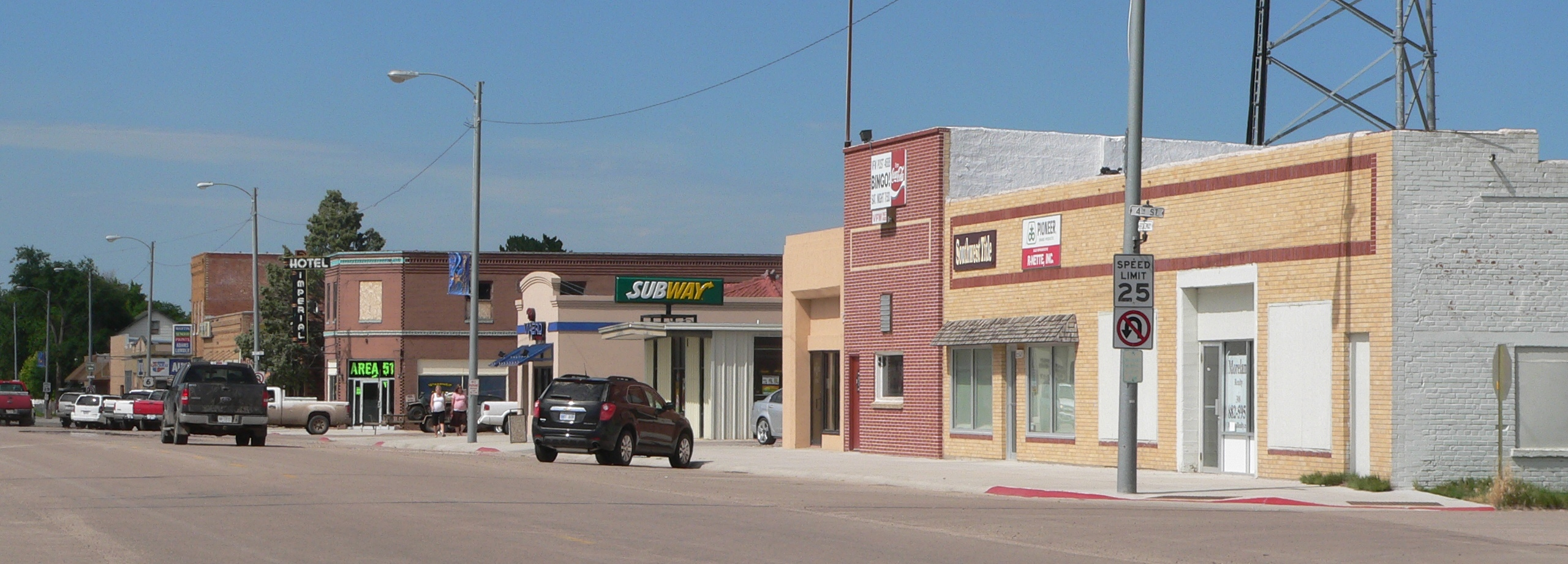
- Downtown Imperial: Broadway, looking north

- Location within Chase County and Nebraska
- Coordinates: 40°30′52″N 101°38′15″W
- Country: United States
- State: Nebraska
- County: Chase

Area
  - Total: 3.03 sq mi (7.85 km^{2})
  - Land: 3.02 sq mi (7.83 km^{2})
  - Water: 0.0039 sq mi (0.01 km^{2})
- Elevation: 3,278 ft (999 m)

Population (2020)
  - Total: 2,068
  - Density: 683.6/sq mi (263.95/km^{2})
- Time zone: UTC-7 (Mountain (MST))
  - Summer (DST): UTC-6 (MDT)
- ZIP code: 69033
- Area code: 308
- FIPS code: 31-23690
- GNIS feature ID: 2394466
- Website: imperial-ne.com

Imperial is a city in Chase County, Nebraska, United States. As of the 2020 census, Imperial had a population of 2,068. It is the county seat of Chase County.

== History ==
The original town of Imperial was built on land homesteaded by Thomas Mercier and M. J. Goodrich. These men gave a town lot to anyone who would put up a building and help to start the town. Mercier was the first postmaster and took office on December 14, 1885.

The railroad right of way was graded to Imperial in 1888. The railroad reached Imperial on August 15, 1892. It was built by a division of the Chicago, Burlington and Quincy Railroad. This line left the main line near Culbertson and terminated in Imperial.

When the grade was completed, the Lincoln Land Company gave lots to all those who would move their buildings to the "Railroad Addition". Nearly all of the buildings were moved south to the future railroad line and the present location of the business district of the town was established.

Imperial's first courthouse was built in 1889 on the land where the present courthouse stands.

=== National Register of Historic Places listings ===
- Balcony House (listed 2000), at the corner of 10th and Court Streets, one block west of Broadway on 10th Street.
- Chase County Court House (listed 1990), on Broadway between 9th and 10th Streets.

== Geography ==
According to the United States Census Bureau, the city has a total area of 2.95 square miles (7.64 km^{2}), all land.

=== Climate ===
Climate data for Imperial, Nebraska (1991–2020 normals, extremes 1894–present)
Month	Jan	Feb	Mar	Apr	May	Jun	Jul	Aug	Sep	Oct	Nov	Dec	Year
Record high °F (°C)	79 (26)	81 (27)	89 (32)	95 (35)	102 (39)	110 (43)	116 (47)	110 (43)	110 (43)	96 (36)	84 (29)	79 (26)	116 (47)
Mean maximum °F (°C)	63.6 (17.6)	68.8 (20.4)	79.0 (26.1)	85.9 (29.9)	90.8 (32.7)	98.1 (36.7)	101.0 (38.3)	98.7 (37.1)	94.9 (34.9)	87.8 (31.0)	75.7 (24.3)	64.7 (18.2)	101.8 (38.8)
Mean daily maximum °F (°C)	42.2 (5.7)	44.9 (7.2)	55.8 (13.2)	63.6 (17.6)	73.2 (22.9)	84.8 (29.3)	90.8 (32.7)	88.5 (31.4)	80.9 (27.2)	67.0 (19.4)	53.5 (11.9)	43.1 (6.2)	65.7 (18.7)
Daily mean °F (°C)	27.2 (−2.7)	29.7 (−1.3)	39.3 (4.1)	47.5 (8.6)	58.5 (14.7)	69.7 (20.9)	75.4 (24.1)	73.0 (22.8)	64.2 (17.9)	50.2 (10.1)	37.6 (3.1)	28.3 (−2.1)	50.0 (10.0)
Mean daily minimum °F (°C)	12.3 (−10.9)	14.5 (−9.7)	22.9 (−5.1)	31.4 (−0.3)	43.8 (6.6)	54.6 (12.6)	60.1 (15.6)	57.5 (14.2)	47.5 (8.6)	33.3 (0.7)	21.7 (−5.7)	13.5 (−10.3)	34.4 (1.3)
Mean minimum °F (°C)	−6.1 (−21.2)	−2.9 (−19.4)	6.6 (−14.1)	18.9 (−7.3)	30.6 (−0.8)	44.8 (7.1)	52.8 (11.6)	49.6 (9.8)	35.2 (1.8)	18.2 (−7.7)	6.8 (−14.0)	−3.6 (−19.8)	−12.6 (−24.8)
Record low °F (°C)	−32 (−36)	−35 (−37)	−24 (−31)	−1 (−18)	15 (−9)	29 (−2)	37 (3)	30 (−1)	19 (−7)	−3 (−19)	−18 (−28)	−34 (−37)	−35 (−37)
Average precipitation inches (mm)	0.36 (9.1)	0.56 (14)	1.13 (29)	2.02 (51)	3.17 (81)	3.30 (84)	2.94 (75)	2.46 (62)	1.36 (35)	1.56 (40)	0.53 (13)	0.39 (9.9)	19.78 (502)
Average snowfall inches (cm)	4.0 (10)	4.8 (12)	5.1 (13)	2.7 (6.9)	0.1 (0.25)	0.0 (0.0)	0.0 (0.0)	0.0 (0.0)	0.1 (0.25)	2.3 (5.8)	3.7 (9.4)	3.2 (8.1)	26.0 (66)
Average precipitation days (≥ 0.01 in)	3.5	5.1	5.6	8.0	9.9	8.7	8.0	7.3	5.0	5.6	3.6	3.5	73.8
Average snowy days (≥ 0.1 in)	3.2	4.1	2.7	1.7	0.1	0.0	0.0	0.0	0.1	0.7	1.9	2.8	17.3
Source: NOAA

== Demographics ==
Historical population
Census	Pop.	Note	%±
1890	159		—
1900	258		62.3%
1910	402		55.8%
1920	723		79.9%
1930	946		30.8%
1940	1,195		26.3%
1950	1,563		30.8%
1960	1,423		−9.0%
1970	1,589		11.7%
1980	1,941		22.2%
1990	2,007		3.4%
2000	1,982		−1.2%
2010	2,071		4.5%
2020	2,068		−0.1%
U.S. Decennial Census; 2013 Estimate

=== 2020 census ===
As of the 2020 census, Imperial had a population of 2,068. The median age was 42.2 years. 25.2% of residents were under the age of 18 and 22.3% of residents were 65 years of age or older. For every 100 females there were 88.5 males, and for every 100 females age 18 and over there were 87.8 males age 18 and over.

0.0% of residents lived in urban areas, while 100.0% lived in rural areas.

There were 832 households in Imperial, of which 32.8% had children under the age of 18 living in them. Of all households, 55.2% were married-couple households, 15.4% were households with a male householder and no spouse or partner present, and 24.8% were households with a female householder and no spouse or partner present. About 29.0% of all households were made up of individuals and 15.9% had someone living alone who was 65 years of age or older.

There were 943 housing units, of which 11.8% were vacant. The homeowner vacancy rate was 4.2% and the rental vacancy rate was 11.6%.

Racial composition as of the 2020 census
Race	Number	Percent
White	1,665	80.5%
Black or African American	7	0.3%
American Indian and Alaska Native	4	0.2%
Asian	2	0.1%
Native Hawaiian and Other Pacific Islander	0	0.0%
Some other race	224	10.8%
Two or more races	166	8.0%
Hispanic or Latino (of any race)	414	20.0%

=== 2010 census ===
As of the census of 2010, there were 2,071 people, 860 households, and 553 families residing in the city. The population density was 702.0 inhabitants per square mile (271.0/km^{2}). There were 948 housing units at an average density of 321.4 per square mile (124.1/km^{2}). The racial makeup of the city was 88.3% White, 0.1% Native American, 0.1% Asian, 9.6% from other races, and 1.9% from two or more races. Hispanic or Latino of any race were 15.4% of the population.

There were 860 households, of which 30.3% had children under the age of 18 living with them, 52.0% were married couples living together, 8.1% had a female householder with no husband present, 4.2% had a male householder with no wife present, and 35.7% were non-families. 31.4% of all households were made up of individuals, and 16% had someone living alone who was 65 years of age or older. The average household size was 2.37 and the average family size was 2.97.

The median age in the city was 41 years. 25.2% of residents were under the age of 18; 7.3% were between the ages of 18 and 24; 22.4% were from 25 to 44; 26% were from 45 to 64; and 19.2% were 65 years of age or older. The gender makeup of the city was 48.9% male and 51.1% female.

=== 2000 census ===
As of the census of 2000, there were 1,982 people, 807 households, and 547 families residing in the city. The population density was 787.2 inhabitants per square mile (303.9/km^{2}). There were 887 housing units at an average density of 352.3 per square mile (136.0/km^{2}). The racial makeup of the city was 97.88% White, 0.05% African American, 0.10% Native American, 0.15% Asian, 1.61% from other races, and 0.20% from two or more races. Hispanic or Latino of any race were 5.15% of the population.

There were 807 households, out of which 32.1% had children under the age of 18 living with them, 57.9% were married couples living together, 6.9% had a female householder with no husband present, and 32.2% were non-families. 29.6% of all households were made up of individuals, and 16.1% had someone living alone who was 65 years of age or older. The average household size was 2.38 and the average family size was 2.94.

In the city, the population was spread out, with 26.0% under the age of 18, 6.6% from 18 to 24, 24.1% from 25 to 44, 21.6% from 45 to 64, and 21.6% who were 65 years of age or older. The median age was 41 years. For every 100 females, there were 93.4 males. For every 100 females age 18 and over, there were 89.2 males.

As of 2000 the median income for a household in the city was $33,833, and the median income for a family was $42,414. Males had a median income of $28,063 versus $19,405 for females. The per capita income for the city was $19,888. About 5.7% of families and 7.7% of the population were below the poverty line, including 5.0% of those under age 18 and 9.6% of those age 65 or over.

== Notable people ==
- Warren Prall Watters, founding archbishop of the Free Church of Antioch, was born in Imperial.
