= Erlangen =

- City
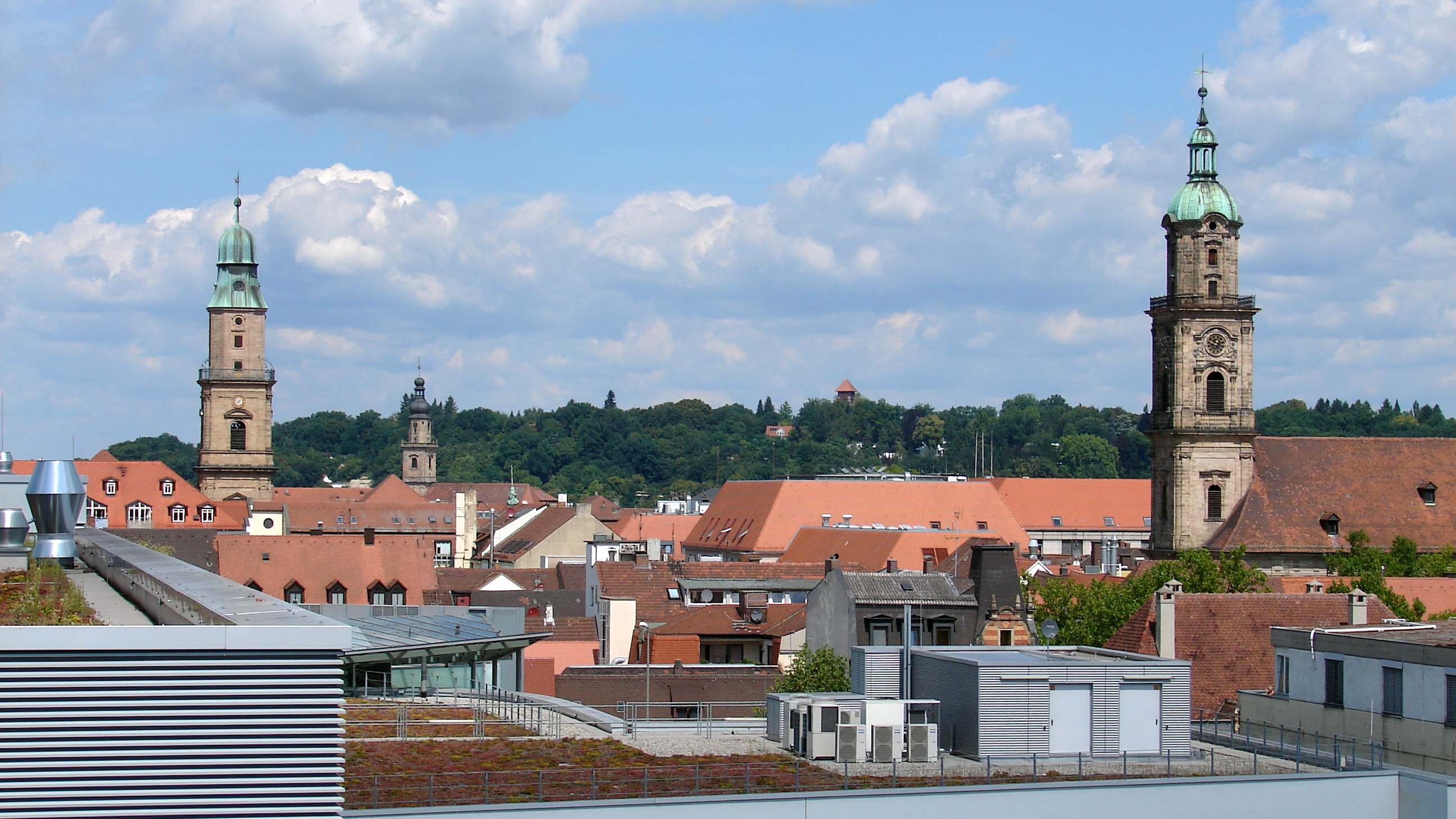
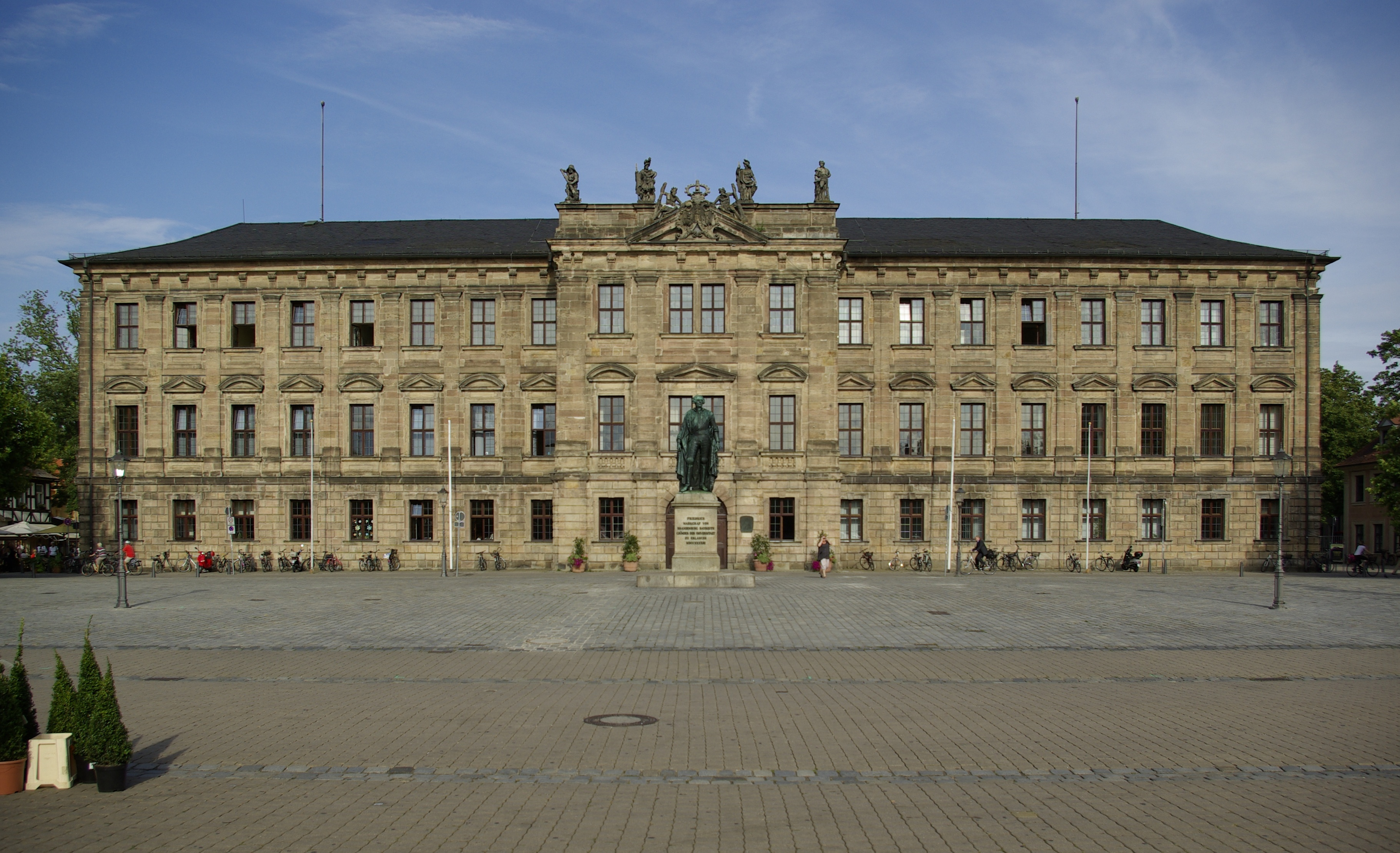
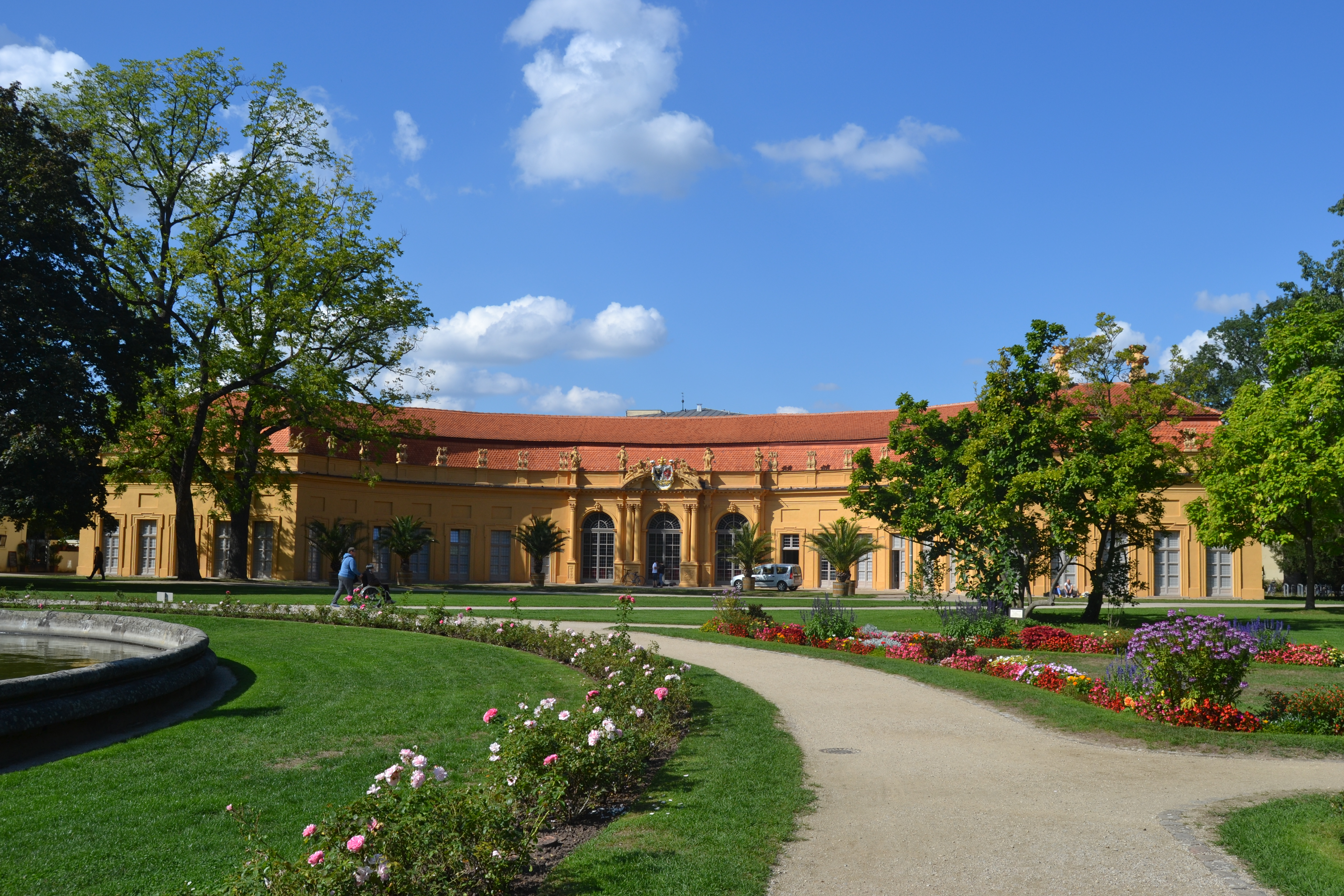
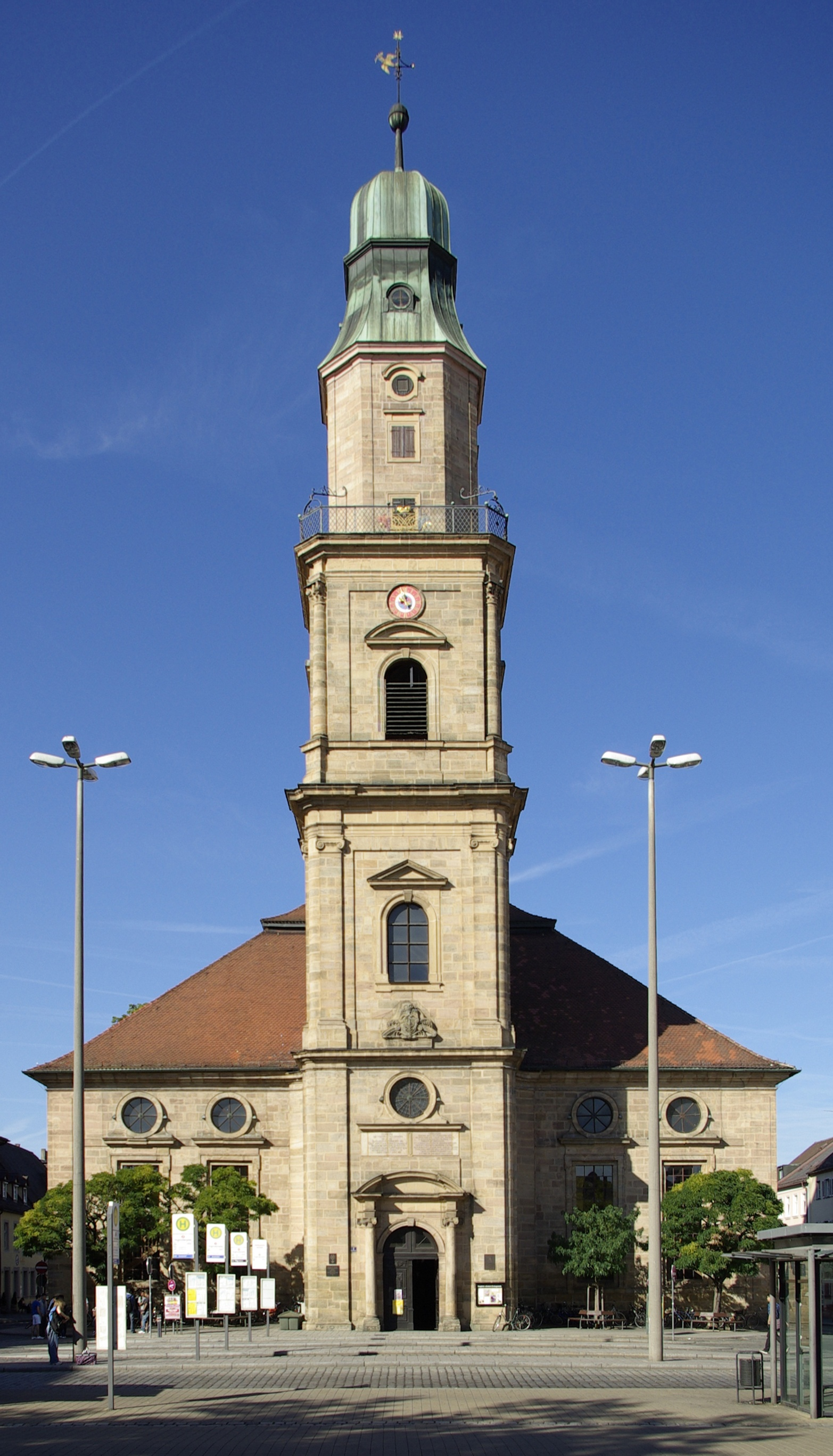
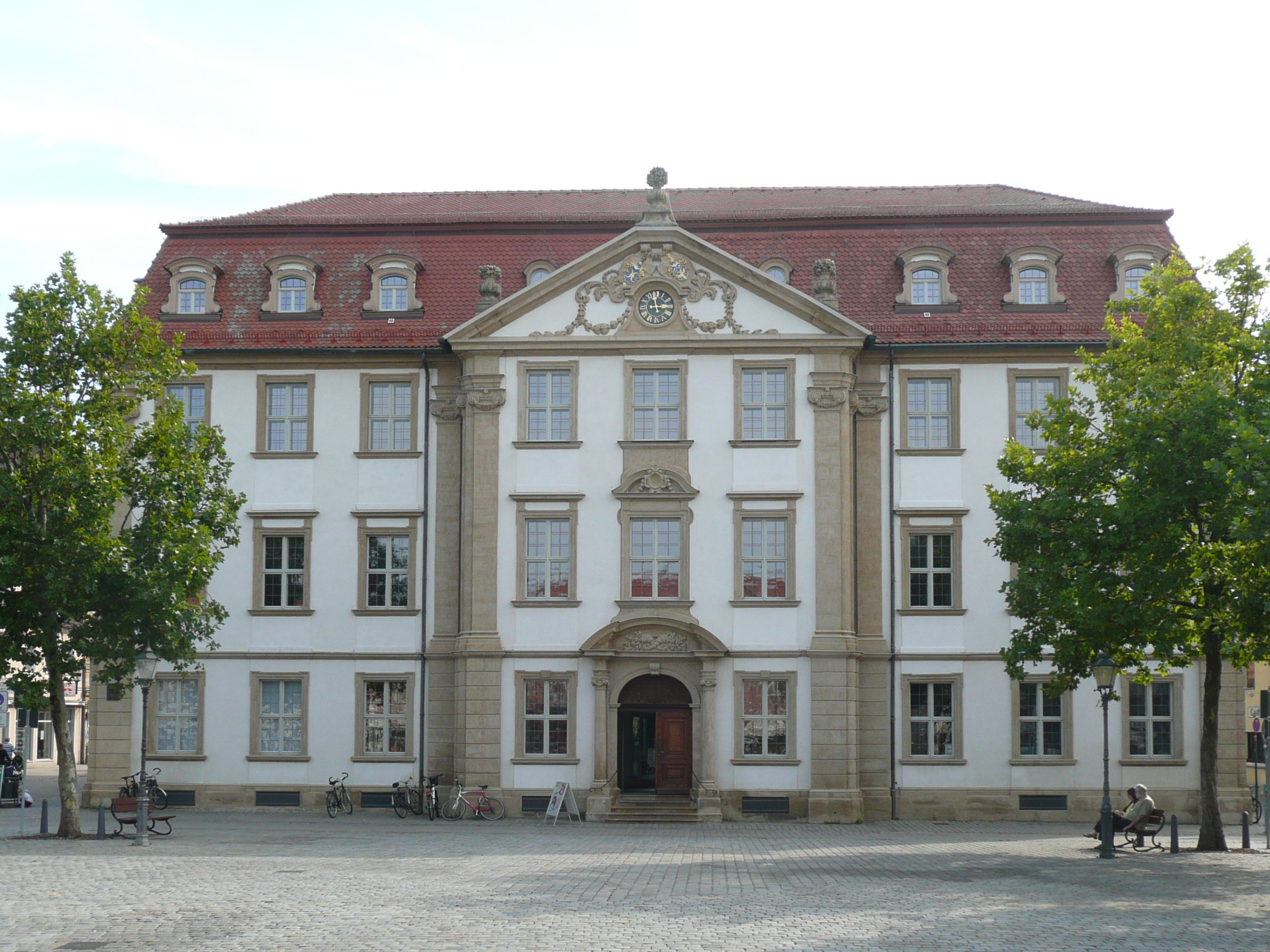
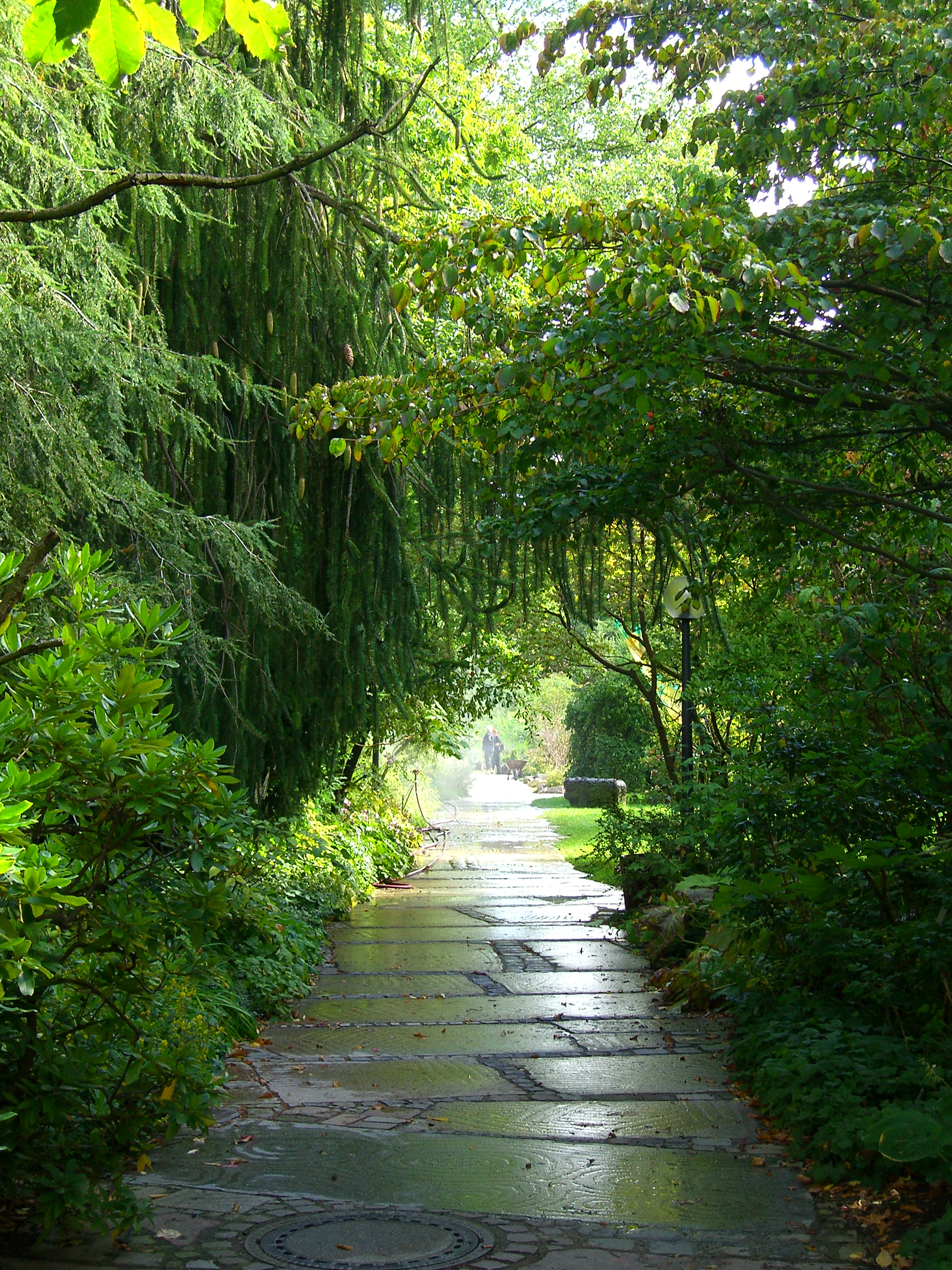
- Aerial view Schloss Erlangen Orangerie Huguenot Church Stutterheimsches Palais Botanical Garden

- Flag Coat of arms
- Interactive map of Erlangen
- Location within Germany Location within Bavaria
- Coordinates: 49°35′33″N 11°00′18″E
- Country: Germany
- State: Bavaria
- Admin. region: Middle Franconia
- District: Urban district
- Subdivisions: 9 city districts

Government
  - Mayor (2026–32): Jörg Volleth (CSU)

Area
  - Total: 76.96 km^{2} (29.71 sq mi)
- Elevation: 279 m (915 ft)

Population (2025-12-31)
  - Total: 116,450
  - Density: 1,513/km^{2} (3,919/sq mi)
- Time zone: UTC+01:00 (CET)
  - Summer (DST): UTC+02:00 (CEST)
- Postal codes: 91052; 91054; 91056; 91058
- Dialling codes: · 09131; · 0911 (district Hüttendorf); · 09132 (district Neuses); · 09135 (district Dechsendorf)
- Vehicle registration: ER
- Website: www.erlangen.de

Erlangen (German: [ˈɛʁlaŋən]) is a Middle Franconian city in Bavaria, Germany. It is the seat of the administrative district Erlangen-Höchstadt (former administrative district Erlangen), and with 120,839 inhabitants (as of 30 June 2026), it is the smallest of the eight major cities (Großstadt) in Bavaria. The number of inhabitants exceeded the threshold of 100,000 in 1974, making Erlangen a major city according to the statistical definition officially used in Germany.

Together with Nuremberg, Fürth, and Schwabach, Erlangen forms one of the three metropolises in Bavaria. With the surrounding area, these cities form the European Metropolitan Region of Nuremberg, one of 11 metropolitan areas in Germany. The cities of Nuremberg, Fürth, and Erlangen also form a triangle on a map, which represents the heartland of the Nuremberg conurbation.

An element of the city that goes back a long way in history, but is still noticeable, is the settlement of Huguenots after the Revocation of the Edict of Nantes in 1685. Today, many aspects of daily life in the city are dominated by the Friedrich Alexander University Erlangen-Nuremberg and the Siemens technology group.

== Geography ==
Erlangen is located on the edge of the Middle Franconian Basin and at the floodplain of the Regnitz River. The river divides the city into two halves of about equal sizes. In the western part of the city, the Rhine–Main–Danube Canal lies parallel to the Regnitz.

=== Neighboring municipalities ===
The following municipalities or nonmunicipal areas are adjacent to the city of Erlangen. They are listed clockwise, starting in the north:

The unincorporated area Mark, the municipalities Möhrendorf, Bubenreuth, Marloffstein, Spardorf, and Buckenhof, and the forest area Buckenhofer Forst (all belonging to the district of Erlangen-Höchstadt), the independent cities of Nuremberg and Fürth, the municipality Obermichelbach (district of Fürth), the city of Herzogenaurach, and the municipality Hessdorf (both in the district of Erlangen-Höchstadt).

=== City arrangement ===
Districts and statistical districts of Erlangen

Gemarkungen of Erlangen

Erlangen officially consists of nine districts and 40 statistical districts, 39 of which are inhabited. In addition, the urban area is subdivided into twelve land registry and land law relevant districts whose boundaries deviate largely from those of the statistical districts. The districts and statistical districts are partly formerly independent municipalities, but also include newer settlements the names of which have also been coined as district names. The traditional and subjectively perceived boundaries of neighborhoods often deviate from the official ones.

==== Districts and statistical districts ====
- Center
  - 01: Altstadt
  - 02: Markgrafenstadt
  - 03: Rathausplatz
  - 04: Tal
- Regnitz
  - 10: Heiligenloh
  - 11: Alterlangen
  - 12: Steinforst
- North
  - 20: Burgberg
  - 21: Meilwald
  - 22: Sieglitzhof
  - 23: Loewenich
  - 24: Buckenhofer Siedlung
  - 25: Stubenloh
- East
  - 30: Röthelheim
  - 32: Sebaldus
  - 33: Röthelheimpark
- South
  - 40: Anger
  - 41: Rathenau
  - 42: Schönfeld
  - 43: Forschungszentrum
  - 44: Bachfeld
  - 45: Bierlach
- Southeast
  - 50: Eltersdorf
  - 51: St. Egidien
  - 52: Tennenlohe
- Southwest
  - 60: Neuses
  - 61: Frauenaurach
  - 62: Kriegenbrunn
  - 63: Hüttendorf
- West
  - 70: Kosbach
  - 71: In der Reuth
  - 73: Häusling
  - 74: Steudach
  - 75: Industriehafen
  - 76: Büchenbach Dorf
  - 77: Büchenbach North
  - 78: Büchenbach West
- Northwest
  - 80: Dechsendorf West
  - 81: Dechsendorf East
  - 82: Mönau (uninhabited)

==== Gemarkungen ====
Erlangen is divided into the following Gemarkungen:

- Büchenbach
- Bruck
- Eltersdorf
- Erlangen
- Frauenaurach
- Großdechsendorf
- Hüttendorf
- Klosterwald
- Kosbach
- Kriegenbrunn
- Mönau
- Tennenlohe

==== Historical city districts ====
Some still common names of historical districts were not taken into account with the official designations. Examples are:

- Brucker Werksiedlung (in Gemarkung Bruck)
- Erba-Siedlung (in Gemarkung Bruck, am Anger)
- Essenbach (near Burgberg, north of Schwabach)
- Heusteg (in Gemarkung Großdechsendorf)
- Königsmühle (in Gemarkung Eltersdorf)
- Paprika-Siedlung (in Gemarkung Frauenaurach)
- Schallershof (in Gemarkung Frauenaurach)
- Siedlung Sonnenblick (in Gemarkung Büchenbach)
- Stadtrandsiedlung (in Gemarkung Büchenbach)
- St. Johann (in the statistical district Alterlangen)
- Werker (near Burgberg, east of the Regnitz)
- Zollhaus (eastern city center)

=== Climate ===
Because of its location in Central Europe, Erlangen is located in a cool temperate climate zone. The place can neither be defined as a place with continental climate, nor a maritime climate. Instead, there are influences of both, such as a low annual precipitation of 645 mm. During the fall and winter months, fog often occurs in the valley of the Regnitz river. There were 97 lightning strikes in the year 2020.

Climate data for Flughafen Nürnberg, 1961–1990
Month	Jan	Feb	Mar	Apr	May	Jun	Jul	Aug	Sep	Oct	Nov	Dec	Year
Mean daily maximum °C (°F)	1.9 (35.4)	4.3 (39.7)	8.9 (48.0)	13.6 (56.5)	18.8 (65.8)	22 (72)	23.7 (74.7)	23.3 (73.9)	20 (68)	14.2 (57.6)	7 (45)	3 (37)	13.4 (56.1)
Daily mean °C (°F)	−1.1 (30.0)	0.5 (32.9)	4 (39)	8.2 (46.8)	13 (55)	16.3 (61.3)	18.1 (64.6)	17.7 (63.9)	14.3 (57.7)	9.4 (48.9)	3.9 (39.0)	0.3 (32.5)	8.7 (47.7)
Mean daily minimum °C (°F)	−4 (25)	−3.3 (26.1)	−1 (30)	2.7 (36.9)	7.2 (45.0)	10.6 (51.1)	10.6 (51.1)	12.1 (53.8)	8.5 (47.3)	4.6 (40.3)	0.8 (33.4)	−2.4 (27.7)	4.0 (39.2)
Average precipitation mm (inches)	45 (1.8)	39 (1.5)	46 (1.8)	48 (1.9)	64 (2.5)	75 (3.0)	69 (2.7)	67 (2.6)	51 (2.0)	45 (1.8)	44 (1.7)	52 (2.0)	645 (25.4)
Source: https://www.wetterkontor.de/de/klima/klima2.asp?land=de&stat=10763

== History ==
=== Overall history ===
==== Early history ====
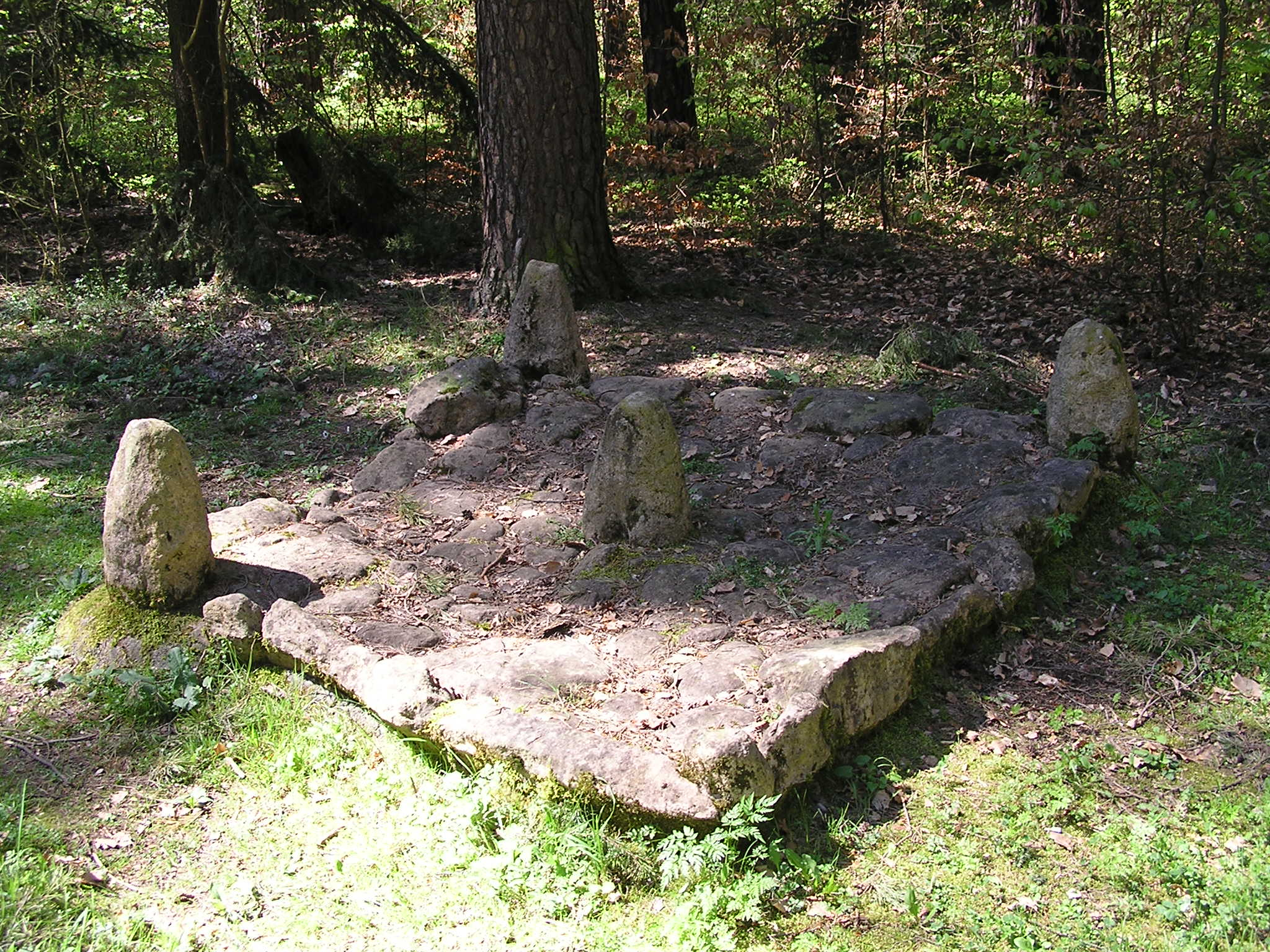
The Kosbacher Altar

In the prehistory of Bavaria, the Regnitz valley already played an important role as a passageway from north to south. In Spardorf a blade scraper was found in loess deposits, which could be attributed to the Gravettians, which places it at an age of about 25,000 years. Due to the relatively barren soils in the area farming and settlements could only be detected at the end of the Neolithic (2800–2200 BC). The "Erlanger Zeichensteine" (Erlangen Sign Stones, sandstone plates with petroglyphs) in the Mark-Forst north of the city also originated in this time period. The stone plates were later reused as grave borders in the Urnfield period (1200–800 BC).

Once investigated in 1913, it was found that the burial mound in Kosbach contained finds from the urnfield time as well as from the Hallstatt and La Tène period. Next to the hill, the so-called "Kosbacher Altar", which was originated in the late Hallstatt period (about 500 BC), was constructed. The altar is unique in this form and consists of a square stone setting with four upright, figural pillars at the corners and one under the center. The reconstruction of the site can be visited in the area, the middle guard is exhibited in the Erlangen city museum.

==== From Villa Erlangen to the Thirty Years' War ====
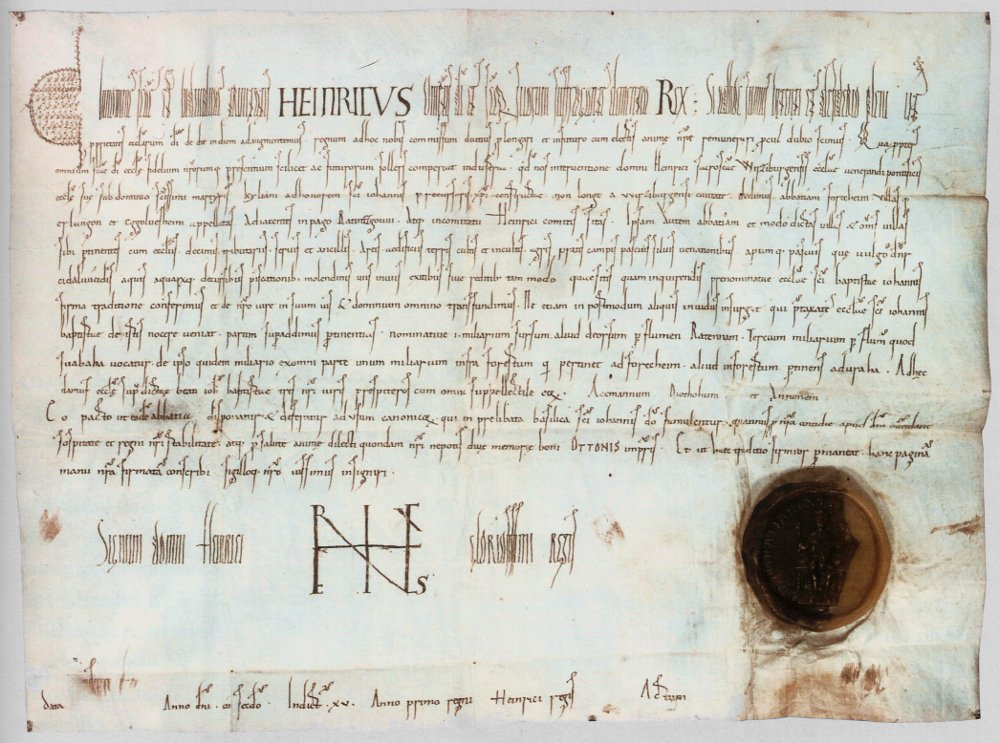
Certificate of Holy Roman Emperor Henry II from 1002, first mentioning Erlangen

Erlangen is first mentioned by name in a document from 1002. The origin of the name Erlangen is not clear. Attempts of local research to derive the name of alder (tree species) and anger (meadow ground), do not meet toponymical standards.

As early as 976, Emperor Otto II had donated the church of St. Martin in Forchheim with accessories to the diocese of Würzburg. Emperor Henry II confirmed this donation in 1002 and authorized its transfer from the bishopric to the newly founded Haug Abbey. In contrast to the certificate of Otto II, the accessories, which also included the "villa erlangon" located in Radenzgau, were described in more detail here. At that time the Bavarian Nordgau extended to the Regnitz in the west and to the Schwabach in the north. Villa Erlangon must therefore have been located outside of these borders and thus not in the area of today's Erlangen Altstadt. However, as the name Erlangen is unique to today's town in Germany, the certificate could have only referred to it. The document also provides an additional piece of evidence: In 1002, Henry II bestowed further areas west of the Regnitz, including one mile from the Schwabach estuary to the east, one mile from this mouth upstream and downstream. These two squares are described in the document only by their lengths and the two river names. No reference to a specific place is given. They are also unrelated to the accessories of St. Martin, which included the "villa erlangon", another reason why it must have been physically separated from the area of the two miles. Size and extent of the two squares correspond approximately to the area requirement of a village at the time, which supports the assumption that at the time of certification a settlement was under construction, which should be legitimized by this donation and later, as in similar cases, has adopted th name of the original settlement. The new settlement was built in a triangle, today bordered by the streets Hauptstraße, Schulstraße and Lazarettstraße, on a flooding-free sand dune.

Only 15 years later, in 1017, Henry II confirmed an exchange agreement, through which St. Martin and its accessories (including Erlangen) were given to the newly founded Bishopric of Bamberg, where it remained until 1361. During these centuries, the place name appears only sporadically.

On 20 August 1063, Emperor Henry IV created two documents "actum Erlangen" while on a campaign. Local researchers therefore concluded that Erlangen must have already gained so much in extent that in 1063, Henry IV took his residence there with many princes and bishops and was therefore the seat of a King's Court. It was even believed that this court could have been located in the Bayreuther Straße 8 and given away without mention by the certificate of 1002. Other evidence of this estate is also missing. It is regarded as most likely today, that Henry IV was not residing in the "new" Erlangen, but rather in the older "villa erlangon", as the north–south valley road changed to the left river bank of the Regnitz and then ran in the direction of Alterlangen, Kleinseebach-Baiersdorf to the north, to avoid the heights of the Erlangen Burgberg.

Otherwise, Erlangen was usually only mentioned if the bishop pledged it due to lack of money. How exactly the village developed is unknown. Only the designation "grozzenerlang" in a bishop's urbarium from 1348 may be an indication that the episcopal village had outstripped the original "villa erlangon".

In December 1361, Emperor Charles IV bought "the village Erlangen including all rights, benefits and belongings". and incorporated it into the area designated as New Bohemia, which was a fief of the Kingdom of Bohemia. Under the crown of Bohemia, the village developed rapidly. In 1367 the emperor spent three days in Erlangen and gave the "citizen and people of Erlangen" grazing rights in the imperial forest, Nuremberg Reichswald. In 1374, Charles IV granted the inhabitants of Erlangen seven years of tax exemption. The money should instead be used to "improve the village". At the same time he lent the market right to Erlangen. Probably soon after 1361, the new ruler of the administration of the acquired property west of the town built the Veste Erlangen, on which a bailiff resided. King Wenceslaus IV of Bohemia built a mint and officially granted township to Erlangen in 1398. He also granted all the usual town privileges: Collection of tolls, construction of a department store with bread and meat bank and the construction of a defensive wall.

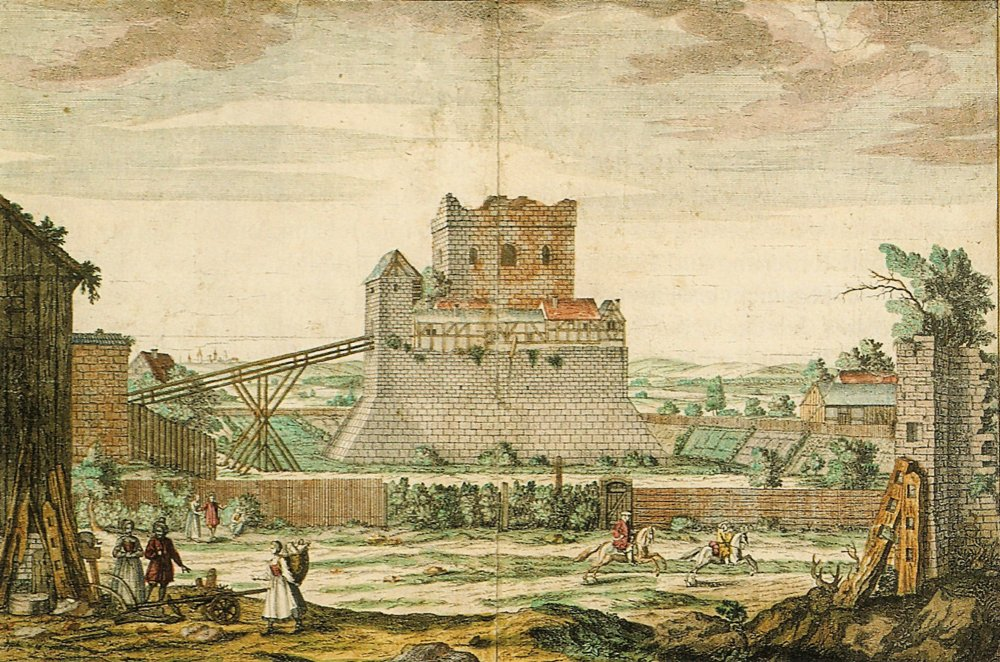
Ruins of the Veste Erlangen, around 1730

Two years later, in 1400, the prince-electors voted to "un-elect" Wenceslaus, who sold his Frankish possessions, including Erlangen, to his brother-in-law, the Nuremberg burgrave Johann III due to lack of funds in 1402. During the process of division of the burggrave property in Franconia, Erlangen was added to the Upper Principality, the future Principality of Bayreuth. The Erlangen coining facility ceased its operation because the Münzmeister was executed for counterfeiting in Nuremberg.

During the Hussite Wars the town was completely destroyed for the first time in 1431. The declaration of war by Margrave Albrecht Achilles to the city of Nuremberg in 1449 led to the First Margrave War. However, as the army of Albrecht could not completely enclose the city, Nuremberg troops broke out again and devastated the Margravial towns and villages. As reported by a Nuremberg chronicler, they "burnt the market at most in Erlangen and brought a huge robbery". As soon as the town had recovered, Louis IX, Duke of Bavaria attacked the Margrave in 1459. Erlangen was raided and plundered again, this time by Bavarian troops. In the following years the town recovered again. Erlangen was spared from the Peasants' War in 1525 and the introduction of the Reformation in 1528 was peaceful. However, when Margrave Albert Alcibiades triggered the Second Margrave War, Erlangen was attacked again by the Nurembergers and partially destroyed. It was even considered to completely abandon the town. Because Emperor Charles V imposed the imperial ban on Albrecht, the Nurembergers incorporated Erlangen into their own territory. Albrecht died in January 1557. His successor, George Frederick, requested that the imperial sequestration over the Principality of Kulmbach be reversed and was able to take back the government one month later. Under his rule, the town recovered from the war damage and remained unharmed until well into the Thirty Years' War.

Little is known about the place itself and about the people who lived here during this period.

From 1129, members of the noble family "von Erlangen" appear as witnesses in notarizations. They were probably ministers of the von Gründlach family. The family had numerous possessions in and around Erlangen as antecedents of the von Gründlach imperial fiefdom. Despite multiple mentions in documents, it is no longer possible to establish a line of ancestry. At the beginning of the 15th century, the family died out.

In a foundation deed of 1328 a property is mentioned on which "heinrich the old sits". Twenty years later, in the Episcopal Urbar of 1348 (see above), seven landowners who were obliged to pay interest were named. For the first time, the entire city is recorded in the register of the Common Penny of 1497: 92 households with 212 adults (over 15 years). If one assumes 1.5 children under the age of 15 per household, the population is calculated to be around 350. This figure is unlikely to have changed much in the subsequent period. The Urbar of 1528 lists 83 taxable house owners and the Türkensteuerliste of 1567 97 heads of households, plus five children under guardianship. A complete list of all households, including tenants, arranged by street, was drawn up in 1616 by the Old Town priest Hans Heilig: At the beginning of the Thirty Years' War, the city counted 118 households with about 500 people.

The old town of Erlangen has been completely destroyed several times, most recently in the great fire of 1706. Only parts of the city wall date back to the late Middle Ages. After the fire of 1706, the cityscape with its street layout had to be rigorously adapted to the regular street scheme of the newly built "Christian-Erlang", which had its own administration (judicial and chamber college) until the administrative reform of 1797. Only the streets Schulstraße, Lazarettstraße and Adlerstraße were spared. The low cellars, however, survived all destruction and fires mostly unscathed. Above them, the buildings were newly erected. For this reason, two Erlangen architects have been surveying the cellars of the old town on behalf of the Heimat- und Geschichtsverein since 1988. At the same time, the city archaeology of Erlangen has excavated in the courtyard of the Stadtmuseum. Both measures give an approximate picture of the late medieval or early modern location: Pfarrstraße ran further north, northern Hauptstraße somewhat further east than today. The western houses at Martin-Luther-Platz protruded to different extents into today's area; on its eastern side the buildings ran diagonally from today's Neue Straße to the city gate "Oberes Tor" (between Hauptstraße 90 and 91). The eastern city wall first led south from Lazarettstraße, then turned slightly southwest from Vierzigmannstraße and cut the base of today's Old Town Church at the northeast corner of the nave. Foundations of this wall, which run exactly in the described direction, were discovered during the excavations in the courtyard of the town museum. Outside the upper gate the upper suburb began to develop. In front of the city gate "Bayreuther Tor" was the lower suburb (Bayreuther Straße to Essenbacher Straße) with the mill at the Schwabach. The Veste was located in the west of the city.

==== Foundation of the new town ====
After the Thirty Years' War, the town was rebuilt relatively quickly. On 2 December 1655 the parish church was consecrated to the title of Holy Trinity. The situation changed in 1685 when French king Louis XIV revoked the Edict of Nantes, which had granted Calvinist subjects – called Huguenots by their opponents – religious freedom since 1598. The revocation triggered a wave of refugees of about 180,000 Huguenots who settled mainly in the Dutch Republic, the British Isles, Switzerland, Denmark, Sweden and some German principalities. A small number of religious refugees later went to Russia and the Dutch and British colonies.

Margrave Christian Ernst also took advantage of this situation and offered the refugees the right to settle in his principality, which was still suffering from the consequences of the Thirty Years' War, in order to promote its economy in the sense of mercantilism through the settlement of modern trades. He was thus one of the first Lutheran princes in Germany to accept Calvinists into his country and even to guarantee them the freedom to practise their religion. The first six Huguenots reached Erlangen on 17 May 1686, about 1500 followed in several waves. In addition, several hundred Waldensians came, however, as they were unable to settle down they moved on in 1688. Even before it was foreseeable how many refugees could be expected, the margrave decided to found the new town of Erlangen as a legally independent settlement south of the small town called Altstadt Erlangen. The rational motive of promoting the economy of one's own country was associated with the hope of wealth as a city founder, which was typical of absolutism.

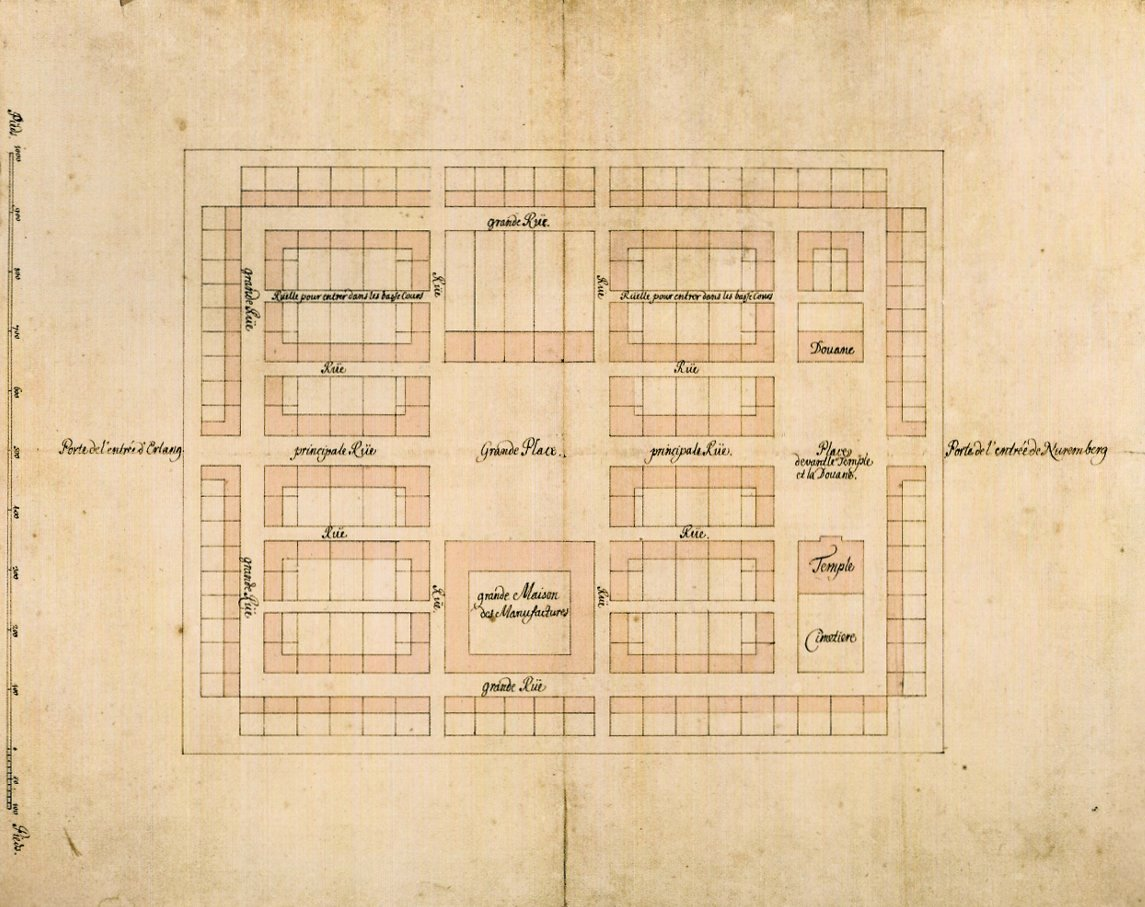
The oldest preserved design of the Erlangen Neustadt, red washed pen drawing (1686), attributed to Johann Moritz Richter

The new city was conveniently located on one of the most important trade and travel routes to and from Nuremberg. Water was to be drained from the nearby Regnitz for a canal necessary for certain trades, however this failed due to the sandy ground. The plan of the city, which at first sight appeared simple, but was in fact extremely differentiated and highly sophisticated, was designed by the margravial master builder Johann Moritz Richter using the "golden ratio" and ideal criteria. The rectangular layout is characterised by the main street, which is designed as an axis of symmetry and has two unequal squares, and the "Grande Rue", which surrounds the inner core and whose closed corners, designed as right angles, act like hinges, giving the entire layout strength and unity. As the plan made clear, it was not the design of the individual buildings that was important, but the overall uniformity of the entire city. Even today, the historical core is characterised by this uniform, relatively unadorned facades of the two-storey and three-storey houses in straight rows with the eaves side facing the street. The construction of the town began on 14 July 1686 with the laying of the foundation stone of the Huguenot Church. In the first year about 50 of the planned 200 houses were completed. The influx of the Huguenots did not meet expectations, because their refugee mentality did not change into an immigrant mentality until 1715. The change of mentality happened in this year, as the peace treaties after the War of the Spanish Succession ruled out their return to France, but also because the Margrave was engaged as commander in the War of the Palatinate Succession against France from 1688 to 1697. Therefore, further expansion stagnated. It was not until 1700 that he received new impetus from the construction of the margravial palace and the development of Erlangen into a royal seat and one of the six provincial capitals. After a major fire destroyed almost the entire old part of the town of Erlangen on 14 August 1706, it was rebuilt on the model of the new town with straightened street and square fronts and a two-storey, somewhat more individually designed house type. In Erlangen, this resulted in the special case of two neighbouring planned cities, which is probably unique in the history of European ideal cities. The old city of Erlangen, which was actually older and still managed independently until 1812, is younger in terms of architectural history than the new city of Erlangen.

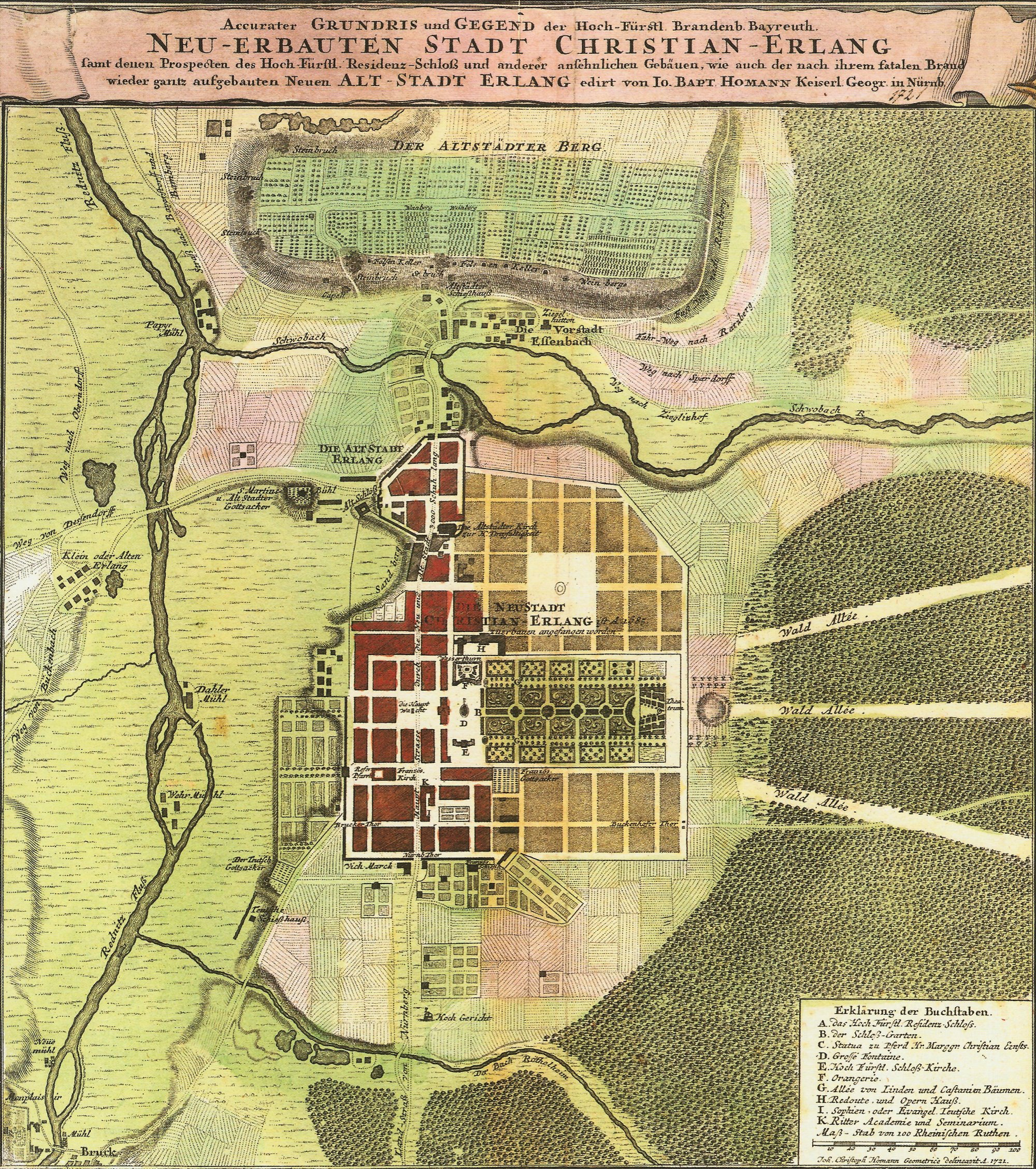
The ground plan of 1721 shows the integration of Erlangen Neustadt and the reconstructed old town into the baroque overall concept. Coloured copper engraving (1721) by Johann Christoph Homann, published by Johann Baptist Homann

The new town, named after its founder Christian-Erlang in 1701, became not only the destination of the Huguenots, but also of Lutherans and German Reformed, who had been granted the same privileges as the Huguenots. In 1698, approximately 1000 Huguenots and 317 Germans lived in Erlangen. Due to immigration, however, the Huguenots soon became a French-speaking minority in a German city. The French influence diminished further in the following years. In 1822, the last service in French was held in the Huguenot Church.

==== Erlangen in the Kingdom of Bavaria ====
In 1792 Erlangen and the Principality of Bayreuth became part of the Kingdom of Prussia. During the War of the Second Coalition, Frederick III of Württemberg retreated to Erlangen after the French occupied Württemberg. When Napoleon won the Battle of Jena and Auerstedt, the two principalities were brought under French rule as a province. In 1810 the principality of Bayreuth was sold to the allied kingdom of Bavaria for 15 million francs. In 1812 the old town and the new town - until then still called Christian-Erlang - were united to form one town, which received the name Erlangen. In the period that followed, the city and its infrastructure were rapidly expanded. Especially the opening of the Ludwig Canal and the railway connections as well as the garrison and the university gave important impulses for the urban development.

Already with the Bavarian community reform of 1818, the city received its own administration, which was later called "free of district". In 1862 the district office Erlangen was formed, from which the administrative district Erlangen emerged.

==== Weimar Republic ====
After Germany's defeat in the First World War, the antidemocratic parties NSDAP, DNVP and KPD gained strong popularity in Erlangen due to high inflation, reparations payments and the world economic crisis. A two-tier society was established, which was reinforced by industrial settlements. In the city council, state parliament and Reichstag elections, the SPD initially held a relatively stable majority of 40%. On the other hand, there were the parties of the centre and the right, whose supporters came from the middle class, the university and the civil service. The NSDAP was represented in the city council from 1924. Five years later, the Erlangen university became the first German university with its student representation controlled by the party, making it a centre of nationalist and anti-democratic sentiment. Many students and professors became intellectual pioneers of National Socialism. From 1930 onwards, the political situation escalated, fuelled by mass unemployment caused by the Great Depression. Both left and right unions organised marches and caused street fights. Despite the strong influx in popularity of the NSDAP, the SPD won 34% of the votes in the 1933 Reichstag election (average: 18.3%).

==== During Nazism ====
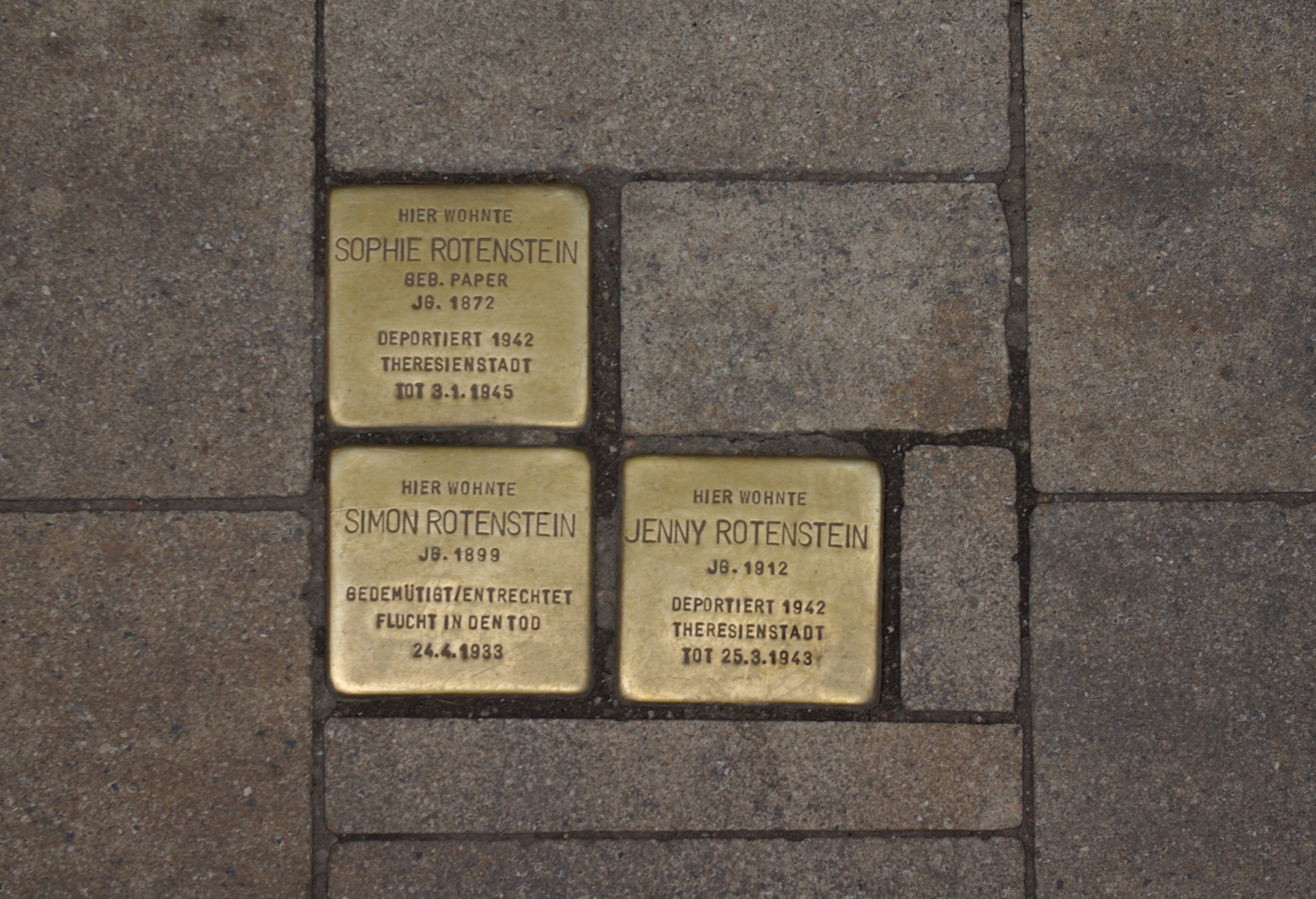
Stolpersteine with the names of murdered Erlangen Jews in front of the building Hauptstraße 63

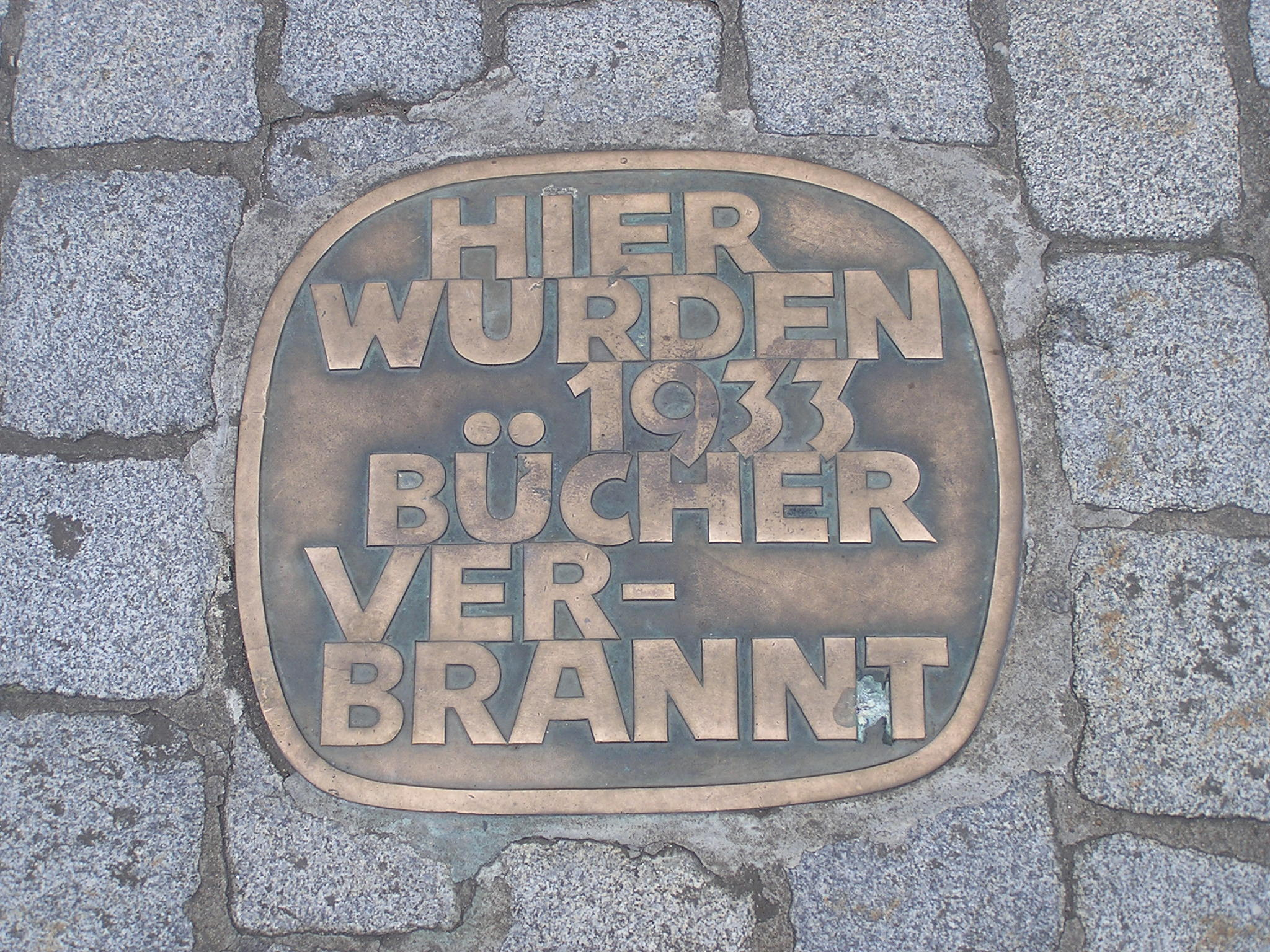
A plaque on the Schlossplatz commemorates the Nazi book burnings.

After the seizure of power by the NSDAP, boycotts of Jewish shops, the desecration and destruction of the monument dedicated to the Jewish professor and Erlangen honorary citizen Jakob Herz on Hugenottenplatz and the burning of books also took place in Erlangen. The NSDAP-controlled city council made Chancellor Hitler, President von Hindenburg and Gauleiter Streicher honorary citizens, the main street was renamed Adolf-Hitler-Straße ("Adolf-Hitler-Street"). During the Reichspogromnacht, the Jewish families from Erlangen (between 42 and 48 people), Baiersdorf (three people) and Forth (seven people) were rounded up and humiliated in the courtyard of the then town hall (Palais Stutterheim), their flats and shops partly destroyed and plundered, then the women and children were taken to the Wöhrmühle (an island in the Regnitz river in Erlangen), the men to the district court prison and then to Nuremberg to prison. Those who could not leave Germany in the following wave of emigration were deported to concentration camps, where most were murdered. In 1944 the city was declared "free of Jews", although a "Half-Jew" stayed in town until the end of the war, protected by the police chief.

As the academic community supported NS politics to a large extent, there was no active resistance from the university. In the sanatorium and nursing home (today part of the Clinic am Europakanal), forced sterilisations and selections of patients for the National Socialist "euthanasia murders (Aktion T4)" took place.

From 1940, prisoners of war and forced labourers were deployed in the Erlangen armament factories. In 1944 they already accounted for 10% of the population of Erlangen. Their accommodation in barrack camps and treatment were inhuman.

In 1983, Erlangen was one of the first cities in Bavaria to begin to reappraise its National Socialist history in an exhibition at the city's museum. In the same year, Adolf Hitler and Julius Streicher were officially deprived of their honorary citizenship, which had automatically expired with their death, as a symbolic gesture of distance.

==== After the Second World War ====
During the Second World War, 4.8% of Erlangen was destroyed by bombings; 445 flats were completely destroyed. When the American troops moved in on 16 April 1945, the local commander of the German troops, Lieutenant Werner Lorleberg handed over the city without a fight, thus avoided a battle inside the city area that would have been pointless and costly. Lorleberg himself, who until the end was regarded as a supporter of the National Socialist regime, died at Thalermühle on the same day. Whether he was shot by German soldiers when he tried to persuade a scattered task force to give up, or whether he committed suicide there after the surrender message was delivered, has not been conclusively established. Lorlebergplatz in Erlangen, named after him, is a memorial to him. The text about Lorleberg, which is attached to it, refers to his death, which had saved Erlangen from destruction.

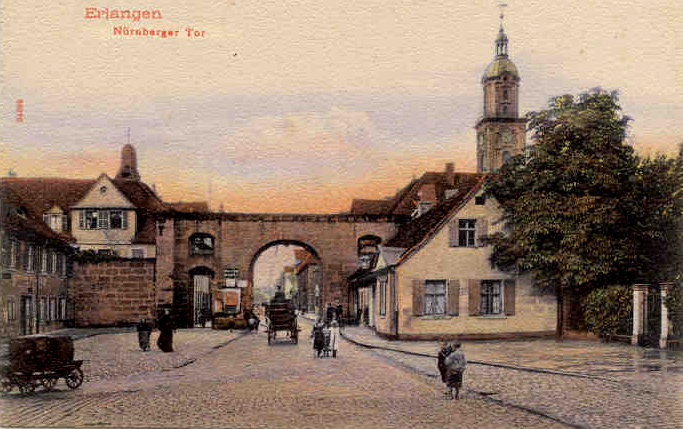
Picture postcard of the Nuremberg Gate

After the handover of the city, American tanks severely damaged the last preserved city gate (the Nuremberg Gate built in 1717), which was blown up shortly afterwards. This probably also happened at the instigation of shopkeepers living in the main street who, like the passing American troops, found the baroque gate an obstacle to traffic because of its relatively narrow passage. The other city gates had already been demolished in the 19th century.

During the district and area reform in 1972, the district of Erlangen was united with the district of Höchstadt an der Aisch. Erlangen itself remained an independent town and became the seat of the new administrative district. Through the integration of surrounding communities, the city was considerably enlarged, so that in 1974 it exceeded the 100,000-inhabitant limit and thus became a major city of Germany. In 2002 Erlangen celebrated its thousandth anniversary.

On 25 May 2009, the city was awarded the title of Ort der Vielfalt (German for "Place of Diversity") by the Federal Government in the context of an initiative launched in 2007 by the Federal Ministry for Family Affairs, Senior Citizens, Women and Youth, the Federal Ministry of the Interior and the Federal Government Commissioner for Migration, Refugees and Integration to strengthen the commitment of municipalities to cultural diversity. Erlangen was awarded the title "Federal Capital for Nature and Environmental Protection" in 1990 and 1991 for its highly successful policy of creating a balance between economy and ecology. It was the first German prizewinner and the first regional authority to be included in the list of honour of the United Nations Environment Agency in 1990. Due to the above-average proportion of medical and medical-technical facilities and companies in relation to the number of inhabitants, Lord Mayor Siegfried Balleis developed the vision of developing Erlangen into the "Federal Capital of Medical Research, Production and Services" by 2010 when he took office in 1996.

=== History of the Erlangen Garrison ===
Until the 18th century, the margrave's soldiers were quartered with private individuals during missions in the Erlangen area. After the city was incorporated into the Kingdom of Bavaria in 1810, it made several attempts to set up a garrison, mainly for economic reasons, but without success at first. When in 1868 the general compulsory military service was introduced with the option to do military service and study at the same time, the garrison became a vital location factor for the city and especially for the university. A renewed application was successful, so that on 12 March 1868 the 6th Hunter Battalion moved into Erlangen. The Bavarian Army was housed in various municipal buildings and used, among other things, today's Theaterplatz square for its exercises. In addition, a shooting range was set up in the Meilwald forest.

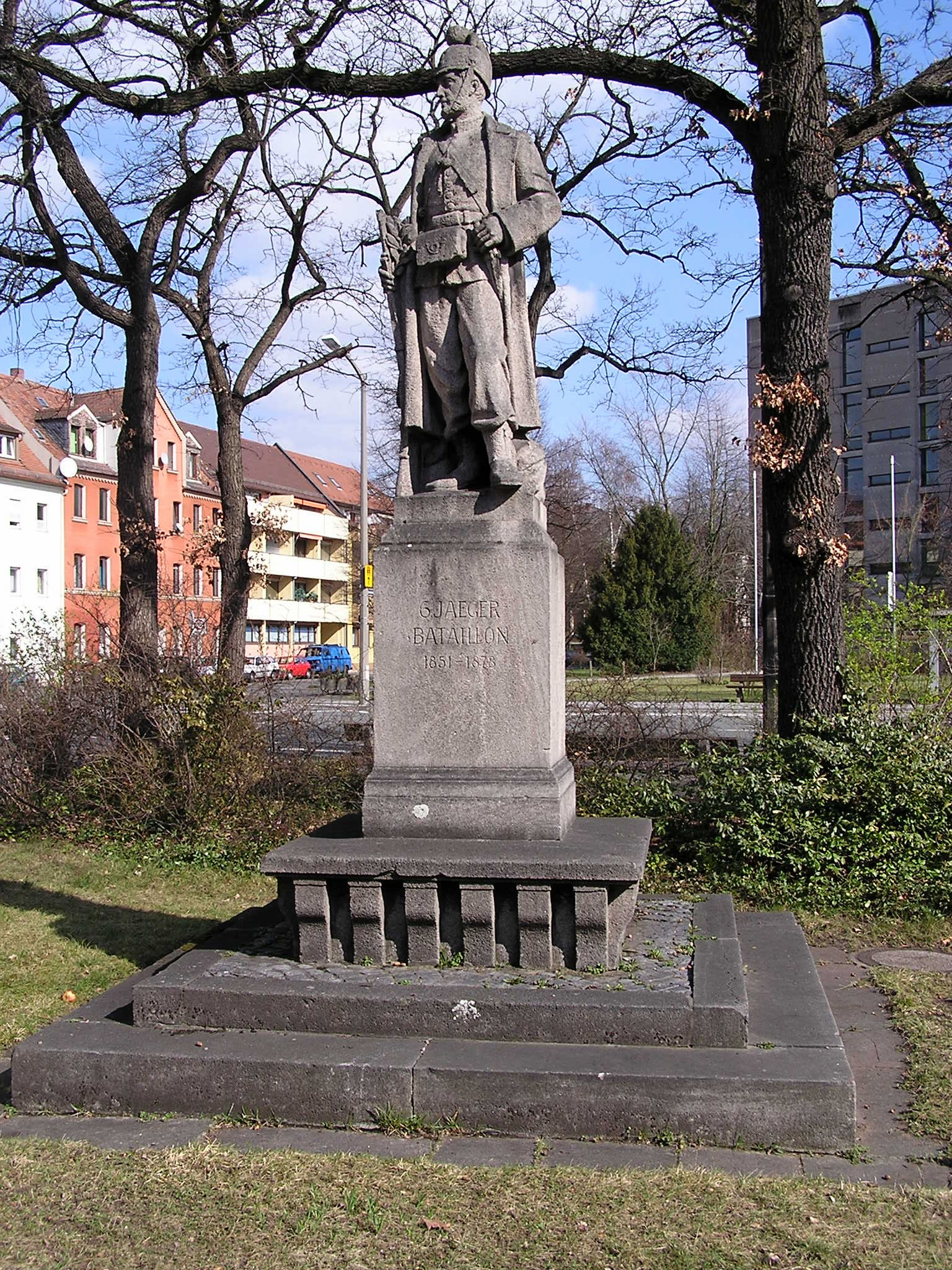
The hunter monument in the Hindenburgstraße reminds of the 6th hunter battalion.

In 1877 the first hunting barracks were completed in the Bismarckstraße (name of street in Erlangen). One year later the hunter battalion was replaced by the III Battalion of the Royal Bavarian 5th Infantry Regiment Grand Duke of Hesse. In 1890 the entire 19th Infantry Regiment was stationed, which resulted in the construction of the Infantry Barracks and the drill ground. In 1893 a "Barrack Casernement" was established in the north-west corner of the drill ground and used as a garrison hospital from 1897. On 1 October 1901, the 10th Field Artillery Regiment moved into the town, for which the artillery barracks were erected. At that time the city had about 24,600 inhabitants, 1160 students and now a total of 2200 soldiers, whom the population held in high esteem, especially after the military successes against France in 1870/71.

In World War I, both Erlangen regiments, which were subordinated to the 5th Royal Bavarian Division, fought exclusively on the Western Front. Over 3,000 soldiers died. After the war Erlangen retained its status as a garrison town. Since the Treaty of Versailles stipulated a reduction of the army to 100,000 soldiers, only the training battalion of the 21st (Bavarian) Infantry Regiment of the newly founded Reichswehr remained in the city.

During the time of National Socialism, the reintroduction of compulsory military service in 1935 and the German re-armament also led to a massive expansion of the military installations in Erlangen. The Rhineland barracks, in which various infantry units were stationed one after the other, the tank barracks, in which the Panzer Regiment 25 was stationed from October 1937, a catering office, an ammunition and equipment depot and a training area were built in the Nuremberg Reichswald (forest), near Tennenlohe.

The invasion of troops by the 7th US Army on 16 April 1945 meant not only the end of World War II for Erlangen, but also the end as a location for German troops. Instead, US American units moved into the military facilities, which had remained undestroyed, and have even been considerably expanded since the reactivation of the 7th US Army in 1950/51: The area of the now Ferris Barracks (named after Lt. Geoffrey Ferris, who died in Tunisia in 1943) was extended to 128 hectares, the living area for the soldiers and their relatives to 8.5 hectares and the training area in Tennenlohe to 3240 hectares. On average, 2500 soldiers and 1500 relatives were stationed in Erlangen in the 1980s.

The population of Erlangen met the presence of the Americans with mixed feelings. Although their protective function during the Cold War and the jobs associated with stationing were welcomed, the frequent conflicts between the soldiers and the civilian population and numerous manoeuvres were a constant source of offence. The first open protests took place during the Vietnam War. These were directed against the training area and the shooting range in Tennenlohe, where even nuclear weapons were suspected, as well as against the ammunition bunkers in the Reichswald. Helmut Horneber, who had been responsible for the American training area for many years as forest director, pointed out in 1993 how exemplarily the American troops had protected the forest areas.

Due to the numerous problems, there were already considerations in the mid-1980s to relocate the garrison from the urban area. After the opening of the Inner German border in 1989, there were growing signs of an imminent withdrawal. In 1990/91 the troops stationed in Erlangen (as part of the VII US Corps) were detached for deployment in the Gulf War. After the end of the Gulf War, the dissolution of the site began and was completed in July 1993. On 28 June 1994, the properties were officially handed over to the German federal government. This marked the end of Erlangen's 126-year history as a garrison town.

=== History of the Erlangen University ===
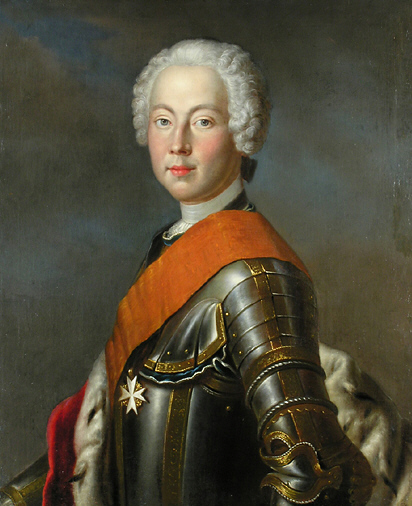
The founder of the university, Margrave Friedrich

The second decisive event for the development of Erlangen was the foundation of the university, in addition to the foundation of the Neustadt. Plans already existed during the Reformation, but it was not until 1742 that Margrave Frederick of Brandenburg-Bayreuth donated a university for the residence city of Bayreuth, which was moved to Erlangen in 1743. The institution, which was equipped with modest means, wasn't met with much approval at first. Only when Margrave Charles Alexander of Brandenburg-Ansbach put it on a broader economic footing did the number of students slowly increase. Nevertheless, it remained below 200 and dropped to about 80 when the margraviate was incorporated into the kingdom of Bavaria. The threatened closure was only averted because Erlangen had the only Lutheran theological faculty in the kingdom.

Like the other German universities, the boom came at the beginning of the 1880s. The number of students rose from 374 at the end of the winter semester 1869/70 to 1000 in 1890. While in the early years law students were at the forefront, at the beginning of the Bavarian period the Faculty of Theology was the most popular. It was not until 1890 that the Faculty of Medicine overtook it. The number of full professors rose from 20 in 1796 to 42 in 1900, almost half of whom were employed by the Faculty of Philosophy, which also included the natural sciences. These did not form their own faculty until 1928. Today there are almost 39,000 students, 312 chairs and 293 professorships in five faculties (as of winter semester 2018/19). At the beginning of the 2011/12 winter semester, Erlangen University was one of the twelve largest universities in Germany for the first time.

In 1897 the first women were allowed to study, the first doctorate was awarded to a woman in 1904. After its founder, Margrave Friedrich, and its patron, Margrave Alexander, the university was named Friedrich-Alexander University.

=== Incorporations into the municipal area ===
Formerly independent communities and districts that were incorporated into the city of Erlangen:

- 1 May 1919: Sieglitzhof (municipality of Spardorf)
- 1 April 1920: Alterlangen (community of Kosbach)
- 1 August 1923: Büchenbach and hamlet of Neumühle
- 15 September 1924: Bruck
- 1960: Parts of Eltersdorf
- 1 January 1967: Kosbach, Häusling and Steudach
- 1 July 1972: Eltersdorf, Frauenaurach, Großdechsendorf, Hüttendorf, Kriegenbrunn, Tennenlohe
- 1 July 1977: Königsmühle (City of Fürth)

Above all, the incorporation during the municipal reform in 1972 contributed significantly to the fact that Erlangen exceeded the 100,000-inhabitant limit in 1974 and thus officially became a city.

=== Historical population ===
Largest groups of foreign residents
Nationality	Population (31 December 2020)
India	2,095
Turkey	1,706
China	1,416
Italy	1,291
Romania	1,239
Syria	1,178
Greece	785
Austria	743
Croatia	708
Poland	607

In the Middle Ages and the beginning of modern times, only a few hundred people lived in Erlangen. Due to numerous wars, epidemics and famines, the increase in population was very slow. In 1634, as a result of the destruction in the Thirty Years' War, the town was completely deserted. In 1655, the population reached 500 again, therefore reaching pre war levels. On 8 March 1708 Erlangen was declared the sixth state capital. By 1760, the population had risen to over 8000. Due to the famines 1770–1772, the population declined to 7224 in 1774. After an increase to approximately 10,000 people in 1800, the population of Erlangen fell once again as a result of the Napoleonic Wars and reached 8592 in 1812.

During the 19th century, this number doubled to 17,559 in 1890. Due to numerous incorporations, the population of the city rose to 30,000 by 1925 and again in the following decades, reaching 60,000 in 1956. Because of district and areal reforms in 1972, the population of the city exceeded the limit of 100,000 in 1974, making Erlangen a major city.

Increased demand for urban homes has led the population to grow further in the 2000s, with predictions claiming the city would reach over 115,000 residents in the 2030s within the current urban area.

Historical population of Erlangen (1495–2018)

Year	Pop.	±%
1495	~460	—
1557	~410	—
1619	~520	—
1634	0	—
1655	~500	—
1690	~1,100	—
1708	~2,500	—
1723	~3,930	—
1752	7,939	—
1760	8,140	+2.5%
1774	7,724	−5.1%
1792	8,178	+5.9%
1800	~10,000	—
1812	8,592	—
1820	9,271	+7.9%
1830 (Note: 1 July)	9,831	+6.0%

Year	Pop.	±%
1840 (Note: 1 December)	10,630	+8.1%
1852 (Note: 3 December)	10,910	+2.6%
1861	10,896	−0.1%
1864	11,202	+2.8%
1867	11,546	+3.1%
1871	12,510	+8.3%
1875	13,597	+8.7%
1880	14,876	+9.4%
1885	15,828	+6.4%
1890	17,559	+10.9%
1895 (Note: 2 December)	20,892	+19.0%
1900	22,953	+9.9%
1905	23,737	+3.4%
1910	24,877	+4.8%
1916	19,688	−20.9%
1917 (Note: 5 December)	19,599	−0.5%

Year	Pop.	±%
1919 (Note: 8 October)	23,521	+20.0%
1925 (Note: 16 June)	29,597	+25.8%
1933	32,348	+9.3%
1939 (Note: 17 May)	34,066	+5.3%
1946 (Note: 29 October)	45,536	+33.7%
1950 (Note: 13 September)	50,011	+9.8%
1956 (Note: 25 September)	60,378	+20.7%
1961 (Note: 6 June)	69,552	+15.2%
1965 (Note: 31 December)	78,800	+13.3%
1970 (Note: 27 May)	84,110	+6.7%
1975	100,671	+19.7%
1980	101,845	+1.2%
1985	99,628	−2.2%
1987 (Note: 25 May)	99,808	+0.2%
1990	101,017	+1.2%
1995	101,361	+0.3%

Year	Pop.	±%
2000	100,064	−1.3%
2005	102,896	+2.8%
2008	104,542	+1.6%
2009	105,164	+0.6%
2010	105,258	+0.1%
2011	105,964	+0.7%
2012	107,103	+1.1%
2013	107,345	+0.2%
2014	108,191	+0.8%
2015 (Note: 31 March)	108,227	+0.0%
2016 (Note: 30 June)	111,056	+2.6%
2017	111,959	+0.8%
2018	112,806	+0.8%
2019	114,200	+1.2%
2020	114,257	+0.0%

== Religion ==
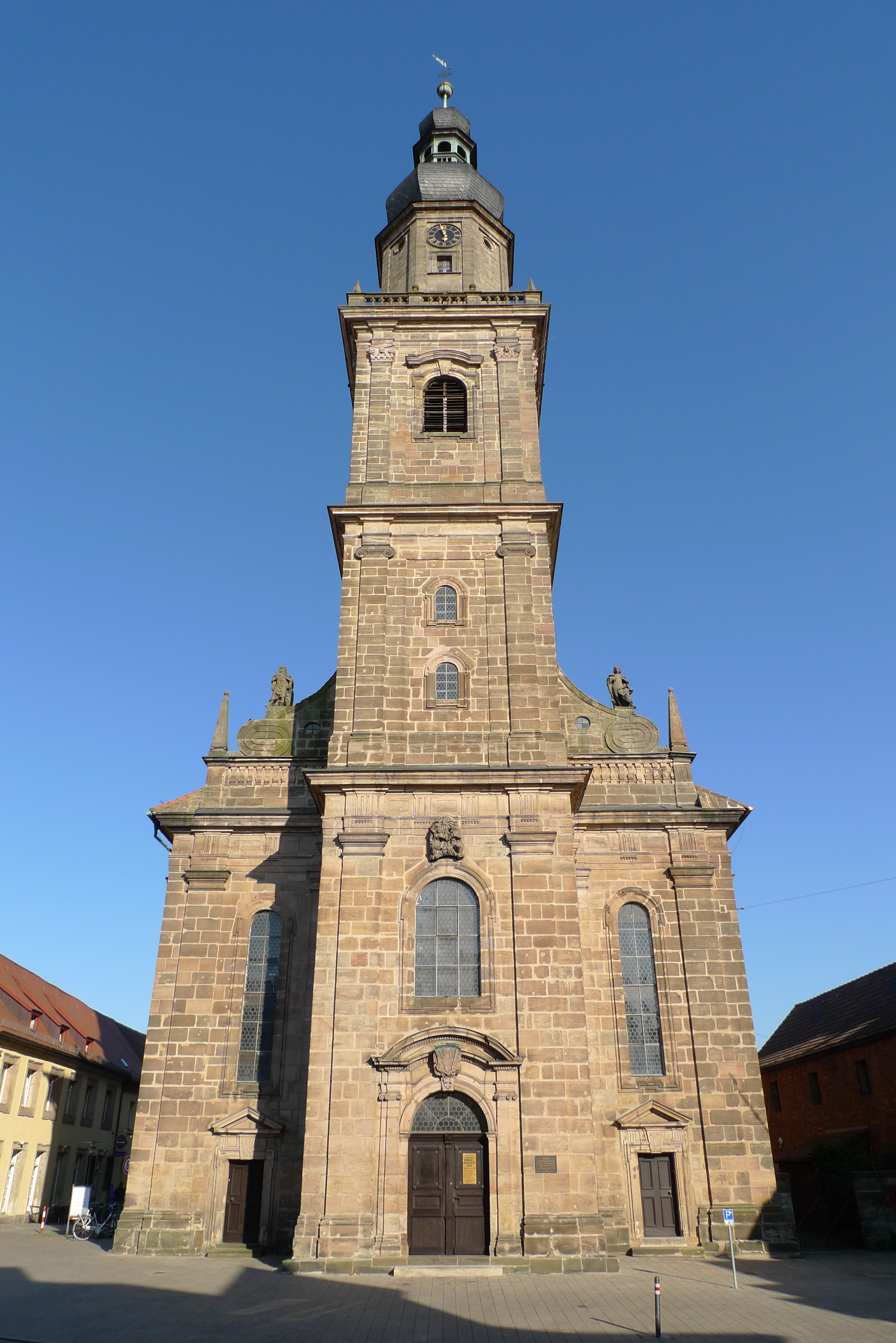
Western side of the Altstädter Church

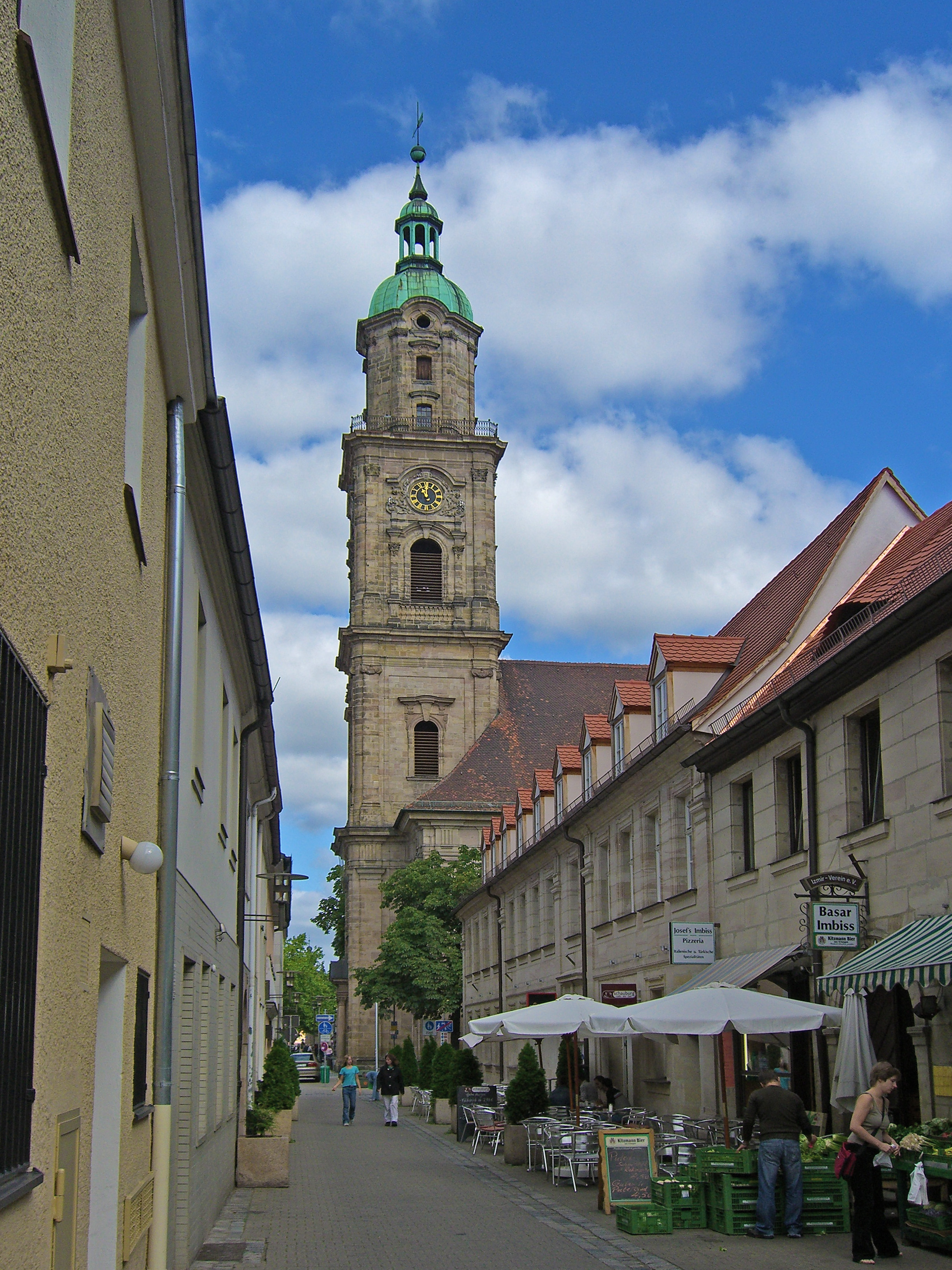
Southern side of the Neustädter Church

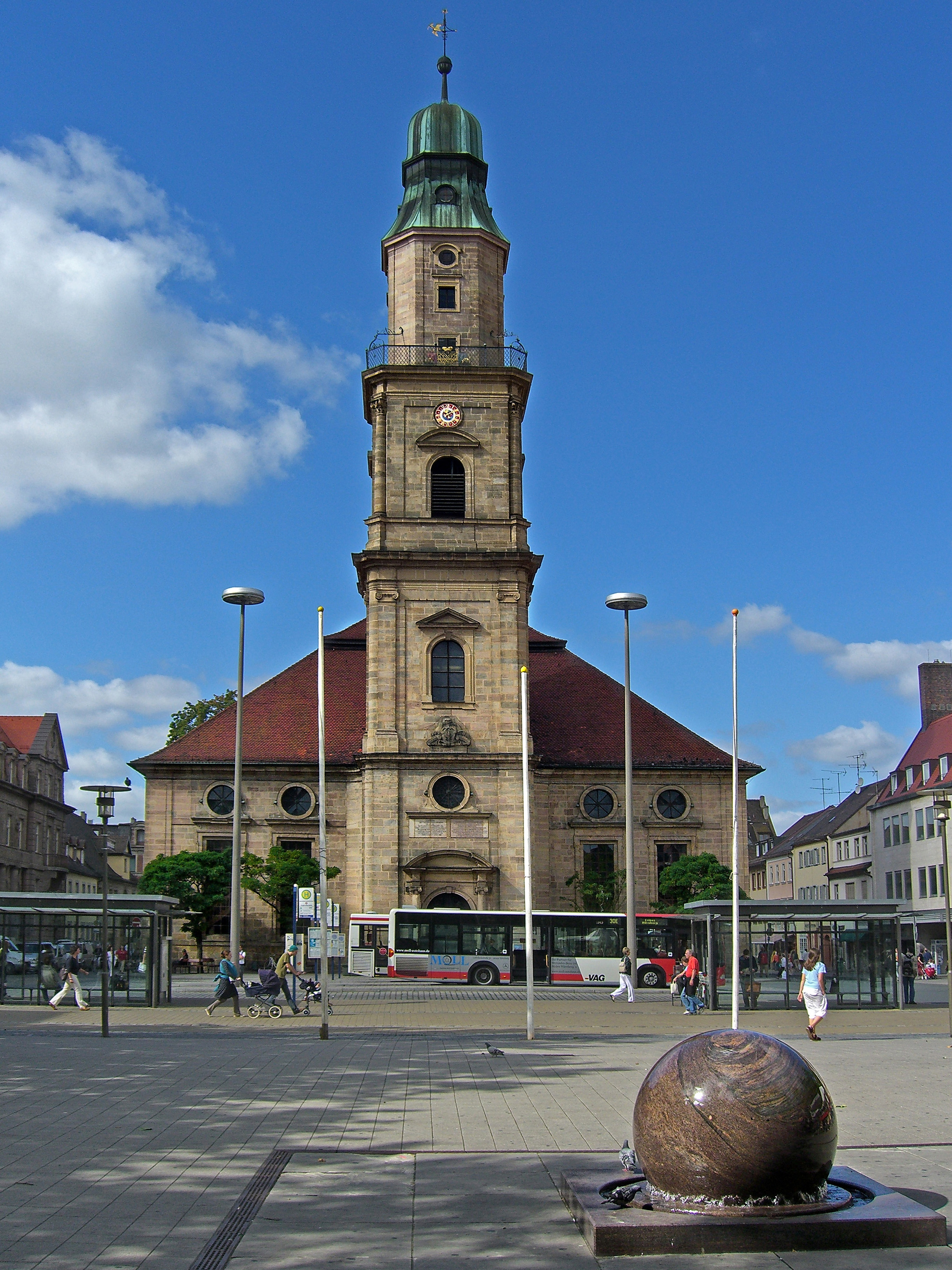
Huguenots Church with Huguenots Square in the foreground

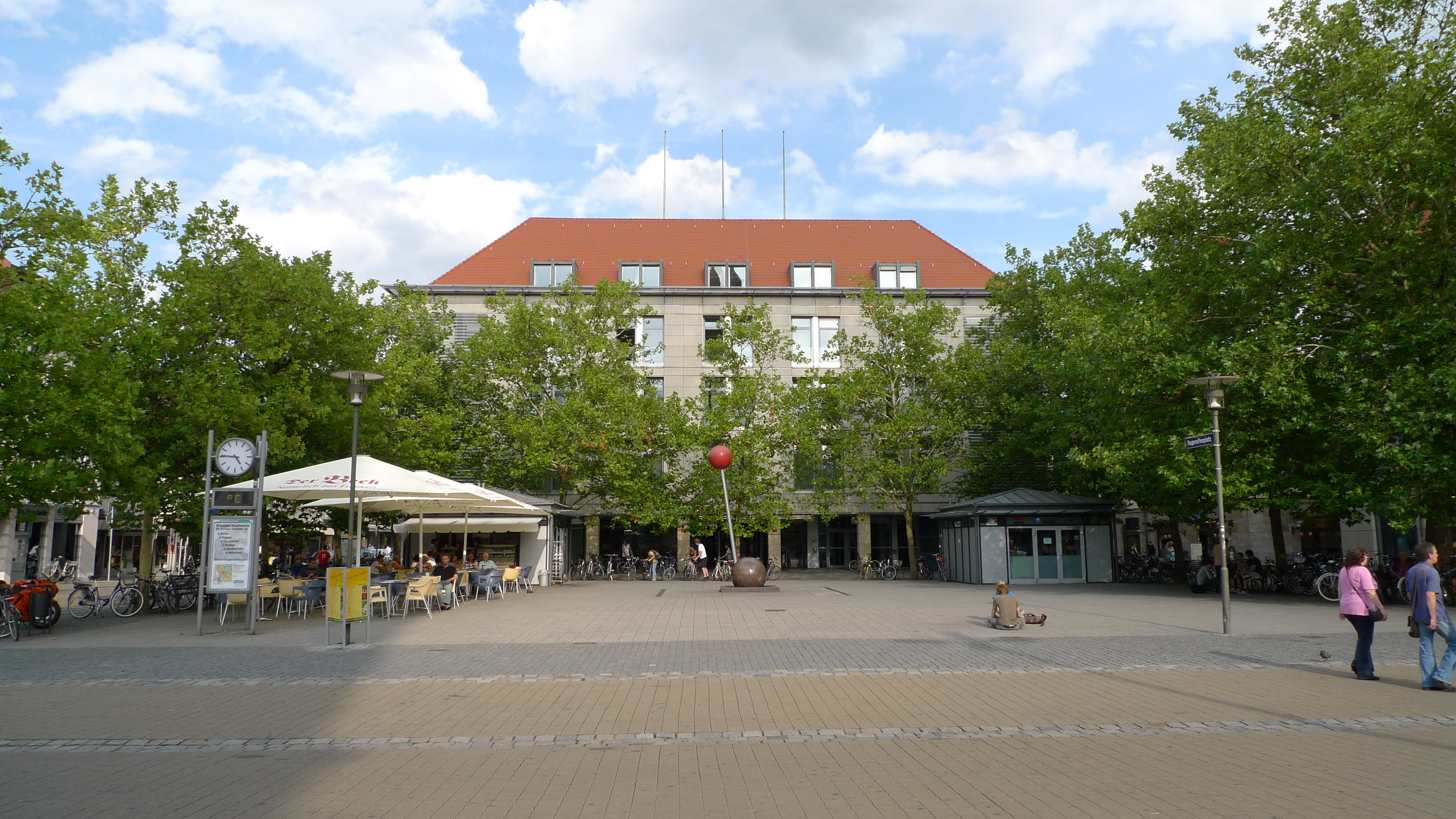
Eastern side of the Huguenots Square

=== Denomination statistics ===
In 2016, 28.6% of the inhabitants were Protestants and 28.1% Roman Catholics. 43.3% belonged to other denominations or religious communities or were nondenominational.

=== Protestant Churches ===
The population of Erlangen initially belonged to the Diocese of Würzburg, from 1017 to the Archdiocese of Bamberg. In 1528, the first Lutheran priest was appointed by the mayor and the council and the Reformation was introduced, so that Erlangen remained a Protestant town for many years. In the new town founded in 1686 by Margrave Christian Ernst for the French religious refugees, there were only Protestant congregations. The French Reformed community existed from 1686 and after the settlement of Protestant refugees from German-speaking Switzerland and the Palatinate, a German Protestant community was founded in 1693.

In 1802 the Protestant communities of Erlangen were placed under the control of the Royal Prussian Consistory in Ansbach and after the transfer of the city to Bavaria they became part of the Protestant Church of the Kingdom of Bavaria, which initially comprised Lutheran and Reformed communities. At the same time Erlangen became the seat of a deanery which united all congregations.

In 1853 the Reformed congregations of Bavaria received their own synod and in 1919 they formally separated from the Evangelical Church of Bavaria. Since then there have been two Protestant regional churches in Bavaria, the Evangelical Lutheran Church in Bavaria and the "Reformed Synod in Bavaria right of the Rhine", which since 1949 had called itself "Evangelical Reformed Church in Bavaria". The latter had for many years the seat of its Moderamen in Erlangen. Through the unification of the German Reformed and the former French Reformed congregations, there was only one Reformed congregation in Erlangen since 1920, but several Lutheran congregations. The Lutheran congregations still belong today to the deanery of Erlangen, which had been founded as deanery for both confessions and since 1919 only serves the Lutheran congregations. It is part of the Nuremberg church district.

The Reformed congregation Erlangen is meanwhile part of the Evangelical Reformed Church. Here it belongs to the Synodal Association XI.

In the Lutheran Church, the regional church communities with their own worship services and offers exist as special forms of congregation. The ELIA congregation has existed since 1993. This arose from a conflict in the church in Bruck over the Charismatic Movement. At first the abbreviation ELIA stood for "Erlanger Laien im Aufbruch" (Erlanger laymen on the move), today the congregation interprets ELIA as "Engagiert, Lebensnah, Innovativ, Ansteckend" (committed, close to life, innovative, contagious). The congregation is bound to the national church by an agreement, but finances and organizes itself like the communities themselves. In 2002 ELIA was awarded the "Fantasie des Glaubens" (Fantasy of Faith) prize by the EKD for the LebensArt church service project.

=== Catholic Churches ===
==== Before the Reformation ====
For a long time, local researchers believed that the oldest church in Erlangen had been built on the Martinsbühl, centuries before the town was first mentioned in a document in 1002. This assumption cannot be proven by any sources. In contrast, the first documented church in today's urban area is the church of the royal court of Büchenbach, which was built as early as 996.

In Erlangen itself, a property deal from the year 1288 gives the first indication of church life, because it was recorded "in cimiterio", i.e. on a cemetery. At that time cemeteries were always built around churches, and, as can be concluded from later sources, this church stood where today the Altstädter Kirche stands at Martin-Luther-Platz. Bone finds during civil engineering work – most recently in 2003 during the redesign of Martin Luther Square – confirm this layout of the medieval churchyard. In the period that followed, numerous foundations for this church were testified to the "salvation and nucz" of souls. Her patrocinium, "frawenkirchen" (Church of Our Lady, thus consecrated to St. Mary), can be concluded from a donation of 1424.

In 1435 the church, which had been the daughter church of St. Martin in Forchheim up until this point, was elevated to its own parish. The main task of the Erlangen priest was the pastoral care in the city of Erlangen and the St. Martin's Chapel on the Martinsbühl, which was now named for the first time. Furthermore, the document of elevation determines the pastoral care of the surrounding villages of Bubenreuth, Bräuningshof, Marloffstein, Spardorf and Sieglitzhof, whose inhabitants visited the chapel of the Virgin Mary, were pastorally cared for from this chapel and were provided with the sacraments. This addition confirms that there was at least one vicar at the Frauenkirche (Church of Our Lady) before it was elevated to a parish church. The ecclesiastical life was accordingly pronounced and varied at the time. In addition to the parish priest, there were two vicars for the early and middle mass. Whether the financially very badly equipped Mass Beneficiaries were always occupied is not known. With the introduction of the Reformation by Margrave George the Pious in 1528 in Erlangen, the Catholic life of the church was extinguished completely for many years. Only few things from this time remain today: five figures of saints from the former Marienkirche, which today are placed on the northern altar wall in the Altstädter Trinity Church, a measuring cup and the equestrian statue of Saint Martin, which is exhibited annually on St. Martin's Day in the Martinsbühler church.

==== From the Thirty Years' War to the first mass celebration ====
According to the agreements of the Peace of Westphalia, Erlangen remained Protestant territory after the end of the Thirty Years' War. Only with the foundation of "Christian Erlang", i.e. the Neustadt, were Catholics allowed to move in, provided they contributed to the construction of the new town. In 1711, the Margrave only granted them the minimum confessional rights guaranteed by the Peace of Westphalia: the Freedom of thought. Baptisms, marriages and funerals were to be carried out according to Protestant rites, and children were to be educated in the Protestant religion. As the number increased, Catholics pushed for more religious rights from about 1730 onwards. The construction of a prayer house, which Margrave Friedrich had promised several times, always failed due to the fierce resistance of the magistrate and the Protestant or French Reformed clergy.

The accession of Frederick the Great to the throne marked the beginning of the age of enlightened absolutism. Under the influence of Frederick's tolerance policy, the position of margravial rule gradually changed. When in 1781 the administration of the Franconian Knights' Circle was transferred to Erlangen, Margrave Alexander granted the Catholic nobles permission for private services. This right was also claimed by their servants. On 16 January 1783 Alexander decided to establish a Catholic private service in Erlangen. In the large hall of the Old Town Hall a mass was celebrated again on 11 April 1784, the first after more than 250 years. In the same year, permission was granted to build a prayer house.

==== From the prayer house to the parish Herz Jesus ====
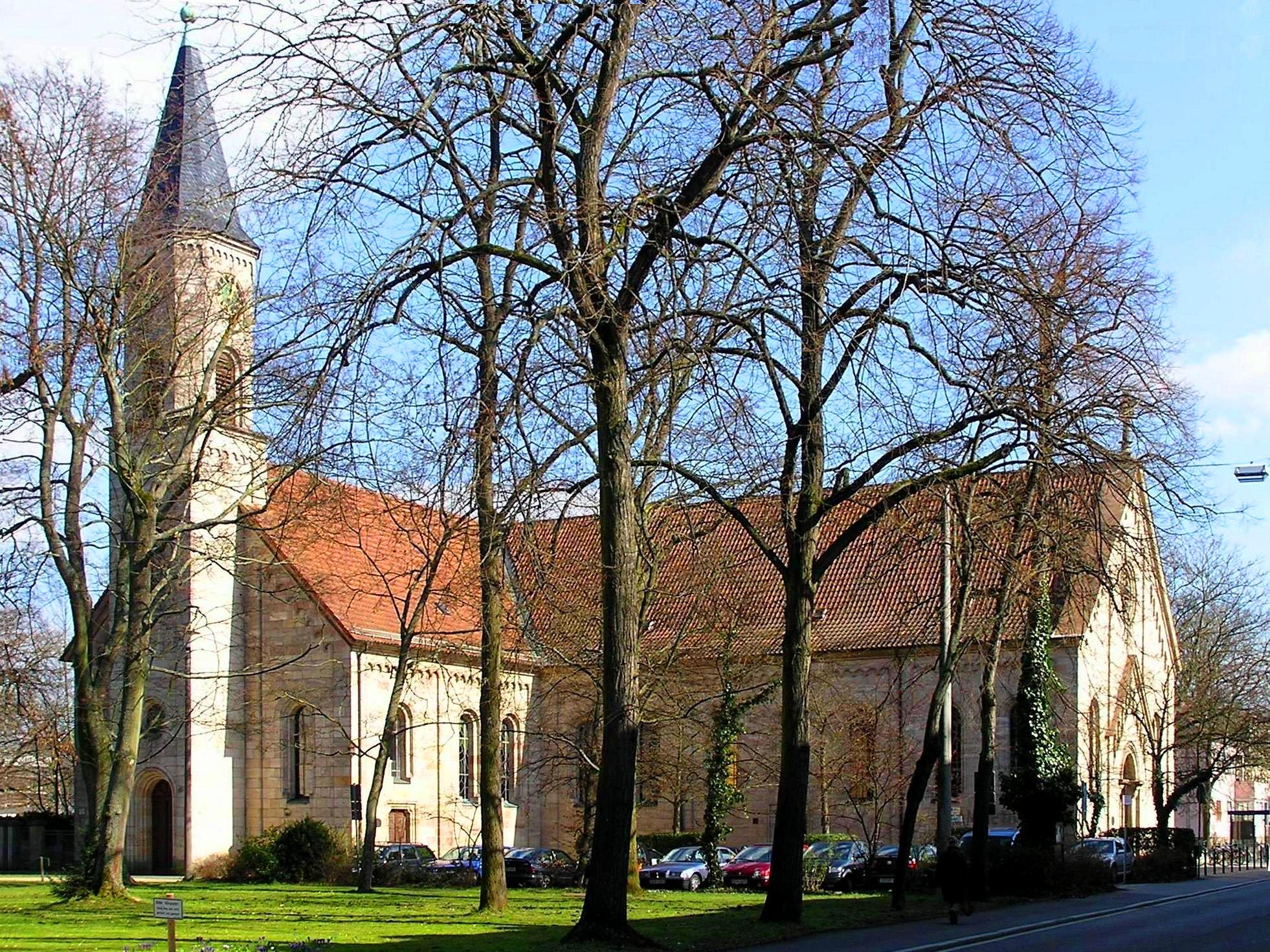
Herz Jesu Church at the Katholischer Kirchplatz

The permission to build a church was subject to heavy conditions: Only a simple prayer house without a tower, bells and organ was permitted. The church services were only allowed to be held with the doors closed, baptisms, weddings and funerals were still reserved for the Protestant clergy. The prayer house was erected far outside the city – at today's Katholischer Kirchplatz (Catholic Church Square) – and ceremoniously opened on St. Peter and Paul's Day in 1790.

The Catholic community, which soon grew with the arrival of French emigrants who had fled from the turmoil of the revolution, found itself in an economic emergency due to constantly changing political conditions. The archdiocese of Bamberg belonged to the electorate of Bavaria since 1803. Erlangen was Prussian until 1806, then French for four years. As subjects employed abroad, the Erlangen clergymen of Bamberg received no salary. This problem was not solved until Erlangen was integrated into Bavaria.

The previous Erlangen Curate was elevated to parish status in 1813, during which time the relationship between the confessions had relaxed completely. When the Catholic priest Rebhahn was buried in 1843, the entire Protestant and Reformed clergy followed the procession. Under his successor, Pankratius von Dinkel, the later bishop of Augsburg, the nave (now the transept) was given its present form in 1850, and a tower was erected in front of the west façade. In the second half of the 19th century – also due to the new garrison – the number of Catholics soon grew to 6,000. A further new building was therefore necessary, which was erected perpendicular to the old base of the building. This gave the church its present appearance in 1895. With the reconstruction, the patronage changed from Schmerzensreiche Mutter (Our Lady of Sorrows) to Herz Jesus (Sacred Heart). Since then, the interior of the Herz Jesu Church has been drastically altered several times, most recently in 2008. Only the baptismal font and a wooden statue of the Good Shepherd remind us of the former prayer house.

==== Developments in the 20th century ====
With the reconstruction of 1895 the extension possibilities of the old prayer house were exhausted. The number of Catholics in Erlangen grew through immigration and incorporation, especially after the Second World War, so that today there is only a slight predominance in favour of Protestants. Beginning in 1928, the number of parishes in Erlangen rose from one to twelve within 70 years.

The following parishes were newly founded:

- 1928 St. Bonifaz in the former southeast of the city area
- 1967 Heilig Kreuz in Bruck
- 1968 St. Sebald in the Sebaldussiedlung and parts of the Röthelheimpark
- 1970 St. Heinrich in Alterlangen
- 1973 St. Theresia in Sieglitzhof
- 1979 Heilige Familie in Tennenlohe
- 1998 Zu den heiligen Aposteln in Büchenbach

The following parishes were incorporated into the city area:

- 1923 St. Xystus, Büchenbach (with branch community Albertus Magnus in Frauenaurach)
- 1924 St. Peter und Paul, Bruck
- 1972 St. Kunigund, Eltersdorf
- 1972 Unsere Liebe Frau, Dechsendorf

Since 1937 Erlangen has been the seat of a dean's office, which was reorganized in the course of the state territorial reform on 1 November 1974. In addition to the Erlangen parishes, it also includes neighbouring congregations from the districts of Erlangen-Höchstadt and Forchheim.

=== Judaism ===
In 1432 Jews were first mentioned in a document in Erlangen, as was a rabbi in 1478. On 26 March 1515, the Margrave's Diet decided to expel the Jews. This probably also ended the existence of the Erlangen Jewish community. In 1711 Margrave Christian Ernst assured the Huguenot inhabitants of the Neustadt that they would not be allowed to settle or trade in the city. Jewish life was therefore restricted to Erlangen's neighbouring communities of Bruck, Baiersdorf and Büchenbach.

- Since 1431 Jews lived in Bruck, in 1604 a "Judenhaus" (Jews' house) is mentioned, which probably served as a synagogue for the still small Jewish community of six families (1619). However, after their number quickly grew to 37 families (1763), a new synagogue was built in 1707. In 1811 the community had 184 members (approx. 15% of the population at that time), in 1859 it had 108.
- In Baiersdorf, a Jewish community was first mentioned in a document from 1473, but the beginning of its existence is suspected to be earlier, especially because the oldest gravestones on the Jewish cemetery date back to the early 14th century. This cemetery had a wide catchment area as far as Forchheim and Fürth. Already in 1530 a synagogue existed, although after the expulsion of the Jews from the margraviate in 1515 only one Jewish family lived in Baiersdorf. After its destruction in the Thirty Years' War, the synagogue was rebuilt in 1651. The community had grown from nine families in 1619 to 83 families in 1771. As the second largest Jewish community in the Markgraftum Brandenburg-Bayreuth, it was also the seat of the state rabbinate. In 1827 the Jewish community reached its largest number of members with 440 members (30% of the population).
- In Büchenbach the Bamberg cathedral provost allowed Jews to settle in 1681. A Jewish community was formed, which had 74 members in 1811 and built a synagogue in 1813. In 1833 103 Jews lived in the village.

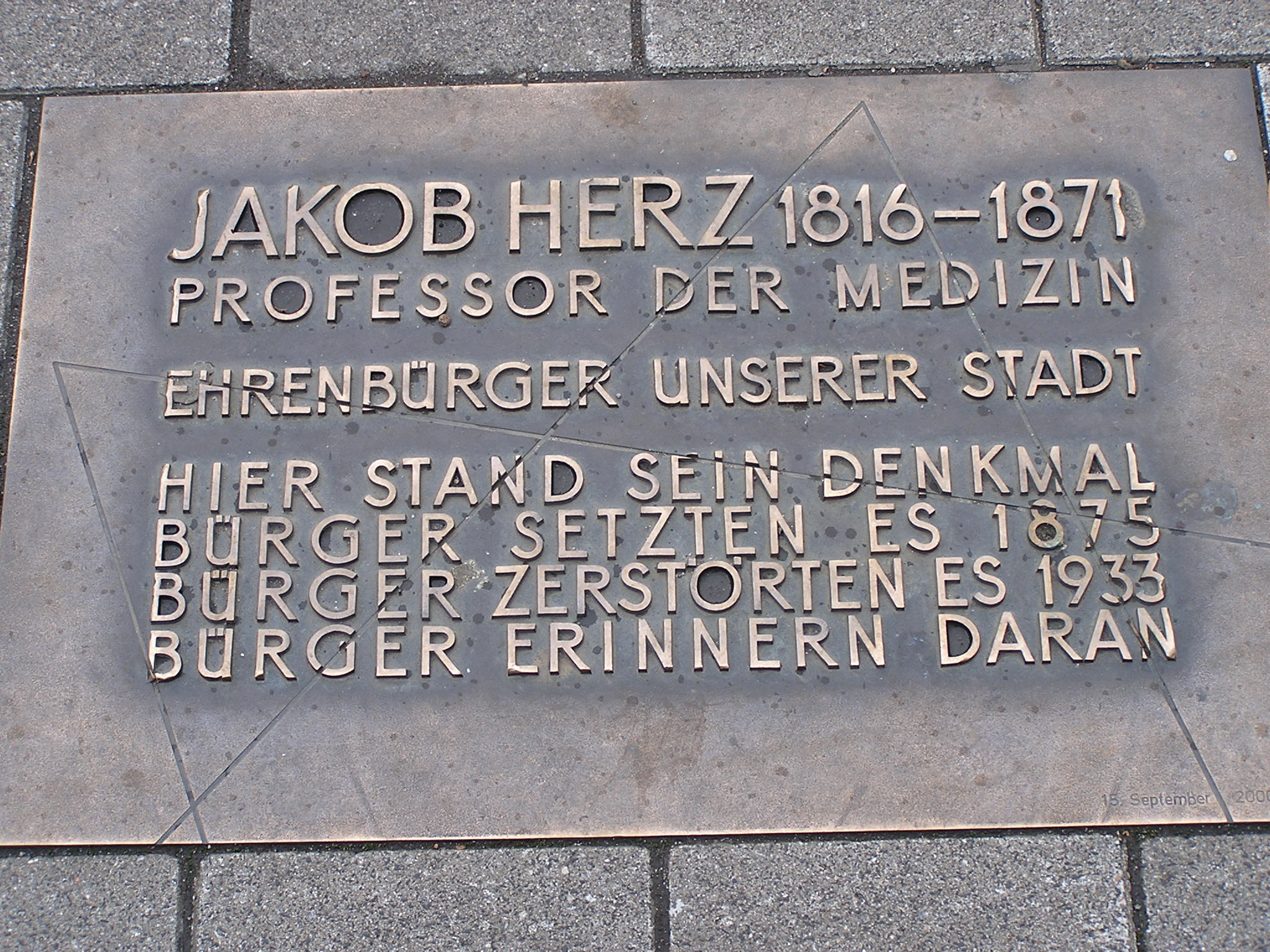
A commemorative plaque commemorates the destroyed memorial for Jakob Herz.

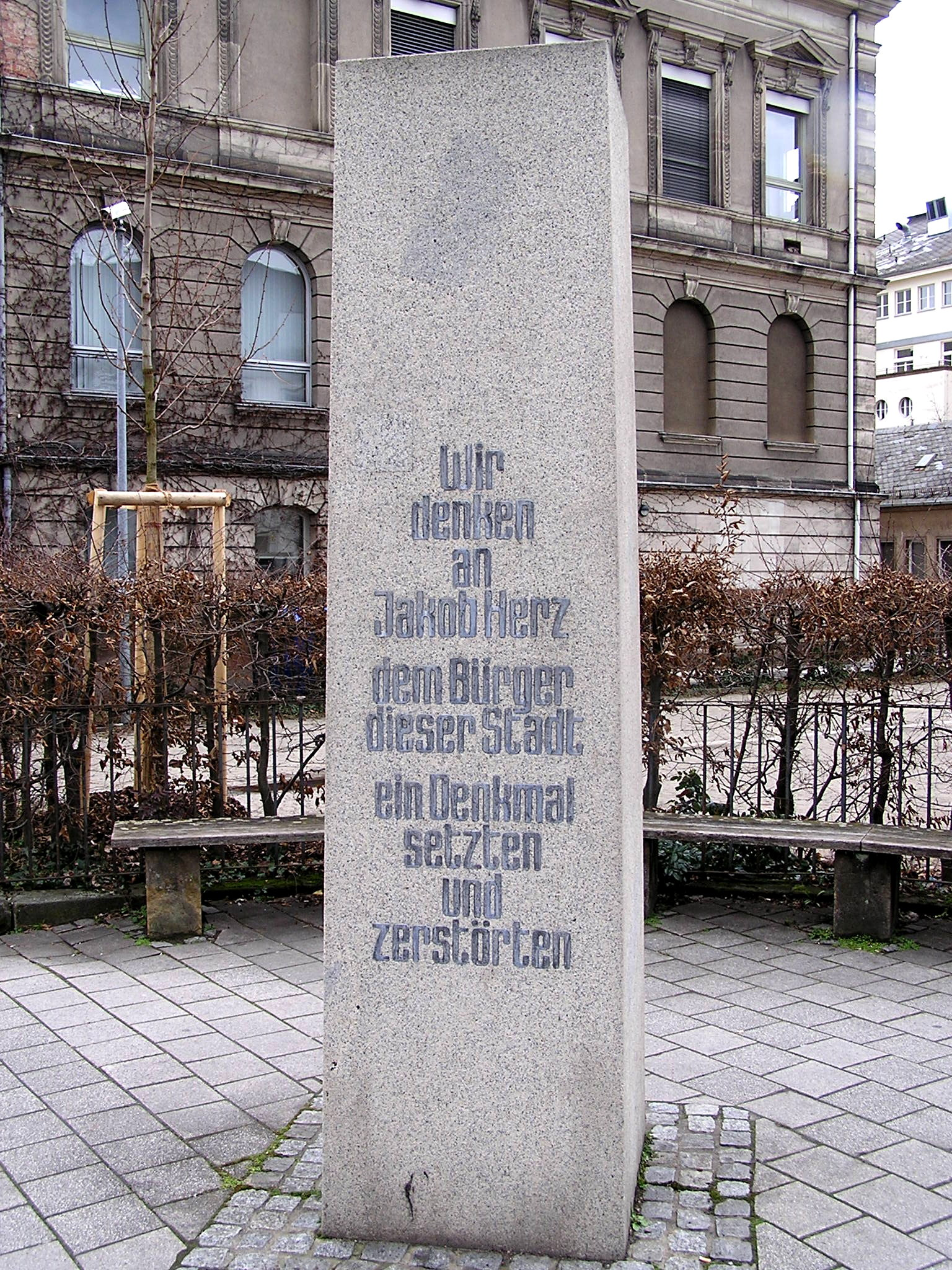
The new memorial for Jakob Herz from 1983

In 1861 the Bavarian parliament introduced general freedom of movement for Jews in Bavaria. This made it possible for Jews to settle in Erlangen. Many Jewish families from the surrounding communities moved to Erlangen because of better prospects, at the same time the communities in Bruck, Baiersdorf and Büchenbach shrank, with Büchenbach's community being dissolved as early as 1874. In 1867, the new Erlangen congregation already had 67 members, who became an independent religious congregation on 15 March 1873. The community in Bruck was merged into it. In 1891 the community inaugurated its own cemetery. On the other hand, the Rabbinate of Baiersdorf was dissolved in 1894, and after 1900 no Jews lived in Bruck. The Erlangen community, on the other hand, included prominent personalities such as the physician and honorary citizen Jakob Herz and the mathematician Emmy Noether. A monument to the former was erected on 5 May 1875 and destroyed on 15 September 1933. Since 1983, a stele has commemorated this process with an inscription: Wir denken an Jakob Herz, dem Bürger dieser Stadt ein Denkmal setzten und zerstörten. (We think of Jakob Herz, the citizen of this town, for who the citizens of this town erected a monument and destroyed it.)

During the National Socialist era, the number of Erlangen Jews initially fell from 120 to 44 by 1938. During the Kristallnacht, the Erlangen prayer hall was destroyed and the synagogue in Baiersdorf demolished. On 20 October 1943, the last Jewish inhabitant of Erlangen was deported to the Auschwitz concentration camp. 77 members of the Jewish community of Erlangen died there.

Of the original Jewish inhabitants, Rosa Loewi and her daughter Marga returned to Erlangen on 16 August 1945, before both emigrated to the United States one year later. In 1980, Lotte Ansbacher (died 19 December 2010) was the last survivor of the Holocaust in Erlangen to return permanently to her hometown, presumably to take up the legacy of her aunt Helene Aufseeser. A special feature of Erlangen was the position created in 1980 of an honorary "representative for former Jewish fellow citizens". In this function, Ilse Sponsel (1924–2010) worked tirelessly to establish and maintain contacts with the surviving Erlangen Jews and their families and to investigate the history and fate of the Jews who perished in the Holocaust in Erlangen, Baiersdorf and the surrounding area. Until the 1970s, the number of Jews grew to such an extent that the publisher Shlomo Lewin planned to establish a new community. On 19 December 1980 he was murdered with his domestic partner Frida Poeschke, presumably by a member of the far-right terrorist group Wehrsportgruppe Hoffmann. However, there was no conviction, as the alleged perpetrator Uwe Behrendt later committed suicide. After this crime, the community was not founded. This idea only gained new momentum with the influx of Jewish emigrants from the former Soviet Union. On 1 December 1997, an Israelite religious community was founded in Erlangen with 300 members in 2000. On 2 April 2000, the congregation inaugurated a new prayer room in Hauptstraße. After a synagogue inaugurated on 9 March 2008 had to be abandoned due to problems with the landlord of the house, a building could be rented in Rathsberger Str. 8b and the new synagogue opened here on 13 June 2010.

=== Islam ===
The Türkisch-Islamischer Kulturverein Erlangen (DITIB, Turkish-Islamic Cultural Association Erlangen) has existed in Erlangen since 1981. Since then, other associations such as the Islamische Studentenverein Erlangen (Islamic Student Association Erlangen) in 1984 and the Islamische Glaubensgemeinschaft (Islamic Religious Community) in 1995 have also been established. Since December 1999, these three have together formed the Islamische Religionsgemeinschaft Erlangen e. V. (Islamic Religious Community Erlangen), which is responsible for Islamic religious education at state schools. The subject "Islamic religious instruction in German language" was introduced for the first time in Bavaria at the Erlangen Pestalozzi primary school in 2001 at a state school. Proper "Islamic instruction" as a subject of instruction was introduced for the first time in all of Germany at the primary school Brucker Lache.

In addition to the three associations mentioned above, the Turkish Association for Social Services has also existed since 1993.

=== Seventh-day Adventist Church ===
The Seventh-day Adventists have been represented in Erlangen since at least 1903. In 1995 they moved into the new community centre in Bruck. In 2003, another congregation (ERlebt) was founded, which gathered in Hindenburgstraße; the latter also inaugurated a new congregation hall in Bruck in October 2007. There is good cooperation between the two communities. The Adventists take an active part in the events in Erlangen. Their social commitment can be seen among other things in the scout work ("Erlanger Markgrafen") or in public blood donation campaigns, which are carried out in the community rooms. Both communities carry out the annual campaign "Kinder helfen Kindern" (Children help children), in which Christmas packages are sent to children in need throughout Eastern Europe. The association "Christen für Kultur e. V." (Christians for culture e. V.) was founded in 1999 by Adventists from Erlangen.

=== Jehovah's Witnesses ===
Jehovah's Witnesses registered their first meeting in Erlangen on 22 March 1923, but the police did not approve it. After the ban in April 1933 there was increased repression, which led to the murder of member Gustav Heyer in the Hartheim Euthanasia Centre on 20 January 1942. The Gustav-Heyer-Straße in Bruck has been a reminder of this since 2000. 1948 saw the reorganization of the community, which split into two subcommunities in 1975. In 1980 the Jehovah's Witnesses built their own assembly room ("Kingdom Hall") in Bruck.

== Politics ==
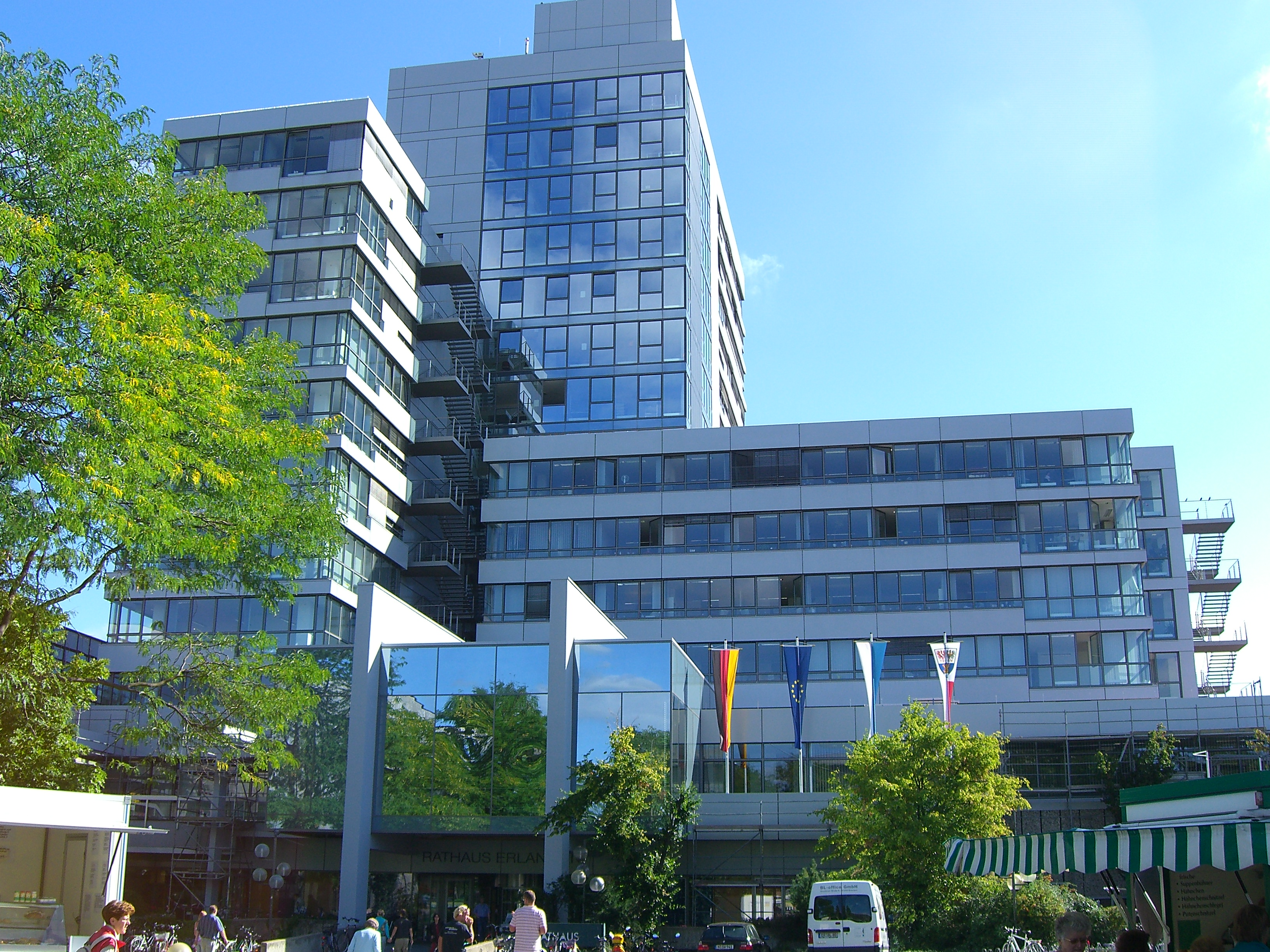
The modernized city hall of Erlangen

Since at least the 14th century there has been a city council in Erlangen's old town. The city was headed by two mayors who changed every four weeks. From 1715 there were even four mayors.

The Neustadt, however, was initially administered by the Reformed presbytery. In 1697 there were four mayors who held office for one year each, three of them French and one German. From 1701 there were four mayors and eight councillors who served for two years. Then the administration was reorganized several times.

After the unification of the old town and the new town in 1812, the Bavarian municipal edict was introduced. From 1818, the town was led by a first mayor, who was usually awarded the title of Oberbürgermeister from 1918. Since 1952, the First Mayor has always held the title of Lord Mayor in accordance with the Bavarian municipal regulations.

From 1818 there was also a city magistrate with ten, from 1900 twelve magistrate councillors and as a second chamber the municipal representatives with 30, from 1900 36 members. After the Second World War there was only one city council. In 1978, Wolfgang Lederer from the Grüne Liste was the first Green politician to move into a Bavarian city council.

In the districts of Eltersdorf, Frauenaurach, Großdechsendorf, Hüttendorf, Kosbach (with Steudach and Häusling), Kriegenbrunn and Tennenlohe, which were incorporated into Erlangen in 1967 and 1972 respectively, a local advisory board was set up. The number of members of the local advisory board depends on the number of inhabitants of the respective areas and varies between five and seven. The local advisory councils are appointed by the political parties according to the last local election result and elect a chairman from among their members. The local advisory councils are consulted on important matters concerning their districts.

There is also a youth parliament in Erlangen which is elected every two years by the 12- to 18-year-olds. Seniors are represented by a seniors' advisory board (the first in Bavaria), people with a migration background by the foreigners' and integration advisory board. In addition, there are a number of other advisory councils that advise the city council on specific topics.

In addition to the political parties and municipal committees, various organisations in Erlangen are active in local politics. These include initiatives that are founded on the basis of specific topics (see in particular referendums) and then dissolve again. The "Altstadtforum" is a non-party alliance of 19 organisations (including all parties represented in the city council, citizens' initiatives and associations). It advocates an attractive, liveable and sustainable old town in Erlangen.

=== Bundestag ===
Erlangen has a constituency in the Bundestag, currently represented by Dr. Konrad Körner from the CSU.

=== Mayors of Erlangen ===
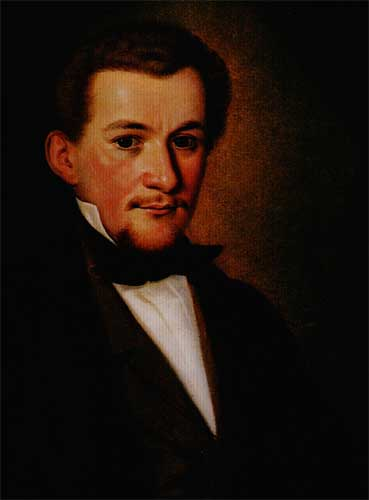
Mayor Heinrich August Papellier

The Oberbürgermeister (Lord Mayor) of the City of Erlangen is elected directly. Jörg Volleth is in office since 1 May 2026.

First mayors or lord mayors since 1818 were:

- 1818–1827: Johann Sigmund Lindner
- 1828–1855: Johann Wolfgang Ferdinand Lammers
- 1855–1865: Carl Wolfgang Knoch
- 1866–1872: Heinrich August Papellier
- 1872–1877: Johann Edmund Reichold
- 1878–1880: Friedrich Scharf
- 1881–1892: Georg Ritter von Schuh
- 1892–1929: Theodor Klippel
- 1929–1934: Hans Flierl
- 1934–1944: Alfred Groß (NSDAP)
- 1944–1945: Herbert Ohly (NSDAP)
- 1945–1946: Anton Hammerbacher (SPD)
- 1946–1959: Michael Poeschke (SPD)
- 1959–1972: Heinrich Lades (CSU)
- 1972–1996: Dietmar Hahlweg (SPD)
- 1996–2014: Siegfried Balleis (CSU)
- 2014–2026: Florian Janik (SPD)
- since 2026: Jörg Volleth (CSU)

=== City council ===
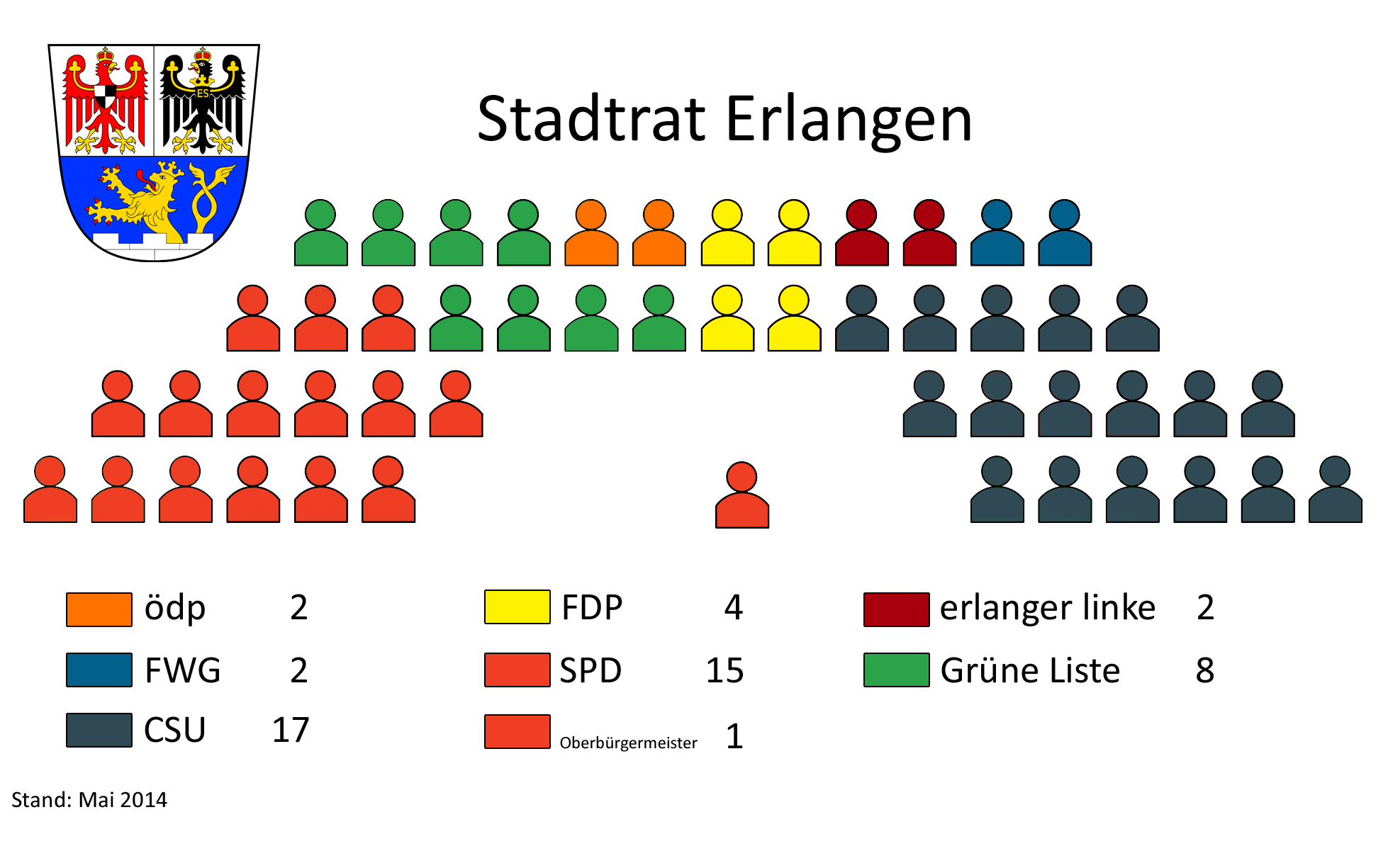
Current composition of the city council

The city council consists of the mayor and 50 other members. It was last elected in 2014. As the strongest faction, the CSU has 17 seats, the SPD has 15 (and additionally the Lord Mayor), the joint election proposal of Alliance 90/The Greens and Grüner Liste has 8, the FDP has 4, the Erlanger Linke, the ÖDP and the Free Voters each have 2 seats. CSU, SPD, GL and FDP each form a parliamentary group, FW and dp a committee community. The majority in the city council forms a so-called "traffic light coalition" consisting of SPD, Green/Green List and FDP, which has 28 votes including the mayor.

=== Referendums ===
The population in Erlangen is comparatively politically active and makes particular use of the opportunity for direct democracy, as shown by the high number of referendums in recent years, which have all achieved the necessary turnout to be legally binding:

- 1998: Sale of Erlanger Stadtwerke (result: against sale)
- 1998: Through road Röthelheimpark (result: for road)
- 2000: Underground car park Theaterplatz (Result: against underground car park)
- 2004: Erlangen Arcaden (construction of a shopping centre) (result: for Arcaden)
- 2005: Privatisation Erlanger Bäder (result: against privatisation)
- 2005: Relocation of taxi stand in old town (result: for relocation)
- 2005: Erlangen Arcaden (citizens' petition and council petition, result: pro council petition)
- 2011: Industrial estate G6 Tennenlohe (council petition, result: against industrial estate)
- 2016: Stadt-Umland-Bahn (StUB) (citizens' petition, result: against withdrawal from the StUB project)
- 2017: Landesgartenschau 2024, result: rejected; demolition ERBA, result: accepted
- 2018: Continuation of preliminary investigation of West III residential area (result: rejected)

=== National, state and regional elections ===
Together with the district of Erlangen-Höchstadt, Erlangen forms the constituency of Erlangen for national elections. The current directly elected member of parliament is Stefan Müller (CSU). Martina Stamm-Fibich (SPD) is also a member of the German Bundestag. Both delegates do not live in the Erlangen city area.

For the Landtagswahlen (state elections), the constituency of Erlangen-Stadt comprises the city of Erlangen as well as Möhrendorf and Heroldsberg from the district of Erlangen-Höchstadt. Directly elected representative is Joachim Herrmann (CSU). In addition, Christian Zwanziger (Greens), who was elected via the Middle Franconian district list, is also represented in the state parliament.

The electoral district for the Bezirkstag of Middle Franconia is identical to the Landtag's electoral district. The directly elected representative was Max Hubmann (CSU) until his death in 2018. In addition, Gisela Niclas (SPD) from the city of Erlangen is a member of the district council, she was elected via the list of her party. Susanne Lender-Cassens (Greens), who was also elected in 2013, resigned after she was elected second mayor.

=== Coat of arms ===
Coat of arms of Erlangen

Blazon: "Divided and split at the top; in the front in silver a red eagle turned to the left, golden crowned and guarded, red tongued with golden clover stems and a breastplate quartered by silver and black; in the back in silver a golden crowned and reinforced, red tongued black eagle with a golden neck crown, clover sticks and the golden capital letters E and S on its chest; below in blue over a silver crenellated wall a double-tailed golden crowned, red tongued lion."

This is the small town coat of arms. If the three parts of the coat of arms are shown on separate plates, above which the customs bracken head with black and silver helmet covers can be seen, then it is the large city coat of arms.

Coat of arms explanatory note: The lion in the lower part of the coat of arms stands for the old town of Erlangen. This is the Luxembourg-Bohemian lion, which has been documented in the city seals since 1389. In the upper half are the Brandenburg and Prussian eagle, which symbolise the new town of Erlangen. They adorned the Neustadt coat of arms since 1707. The letters E and S stand for Elisabeth Sophie, the wife of Margrave Christian Ernst.

The city flag is white-red.

=== Signet ===
Signet of Erlangen

Since 1977, the city of Erlangen has been using a signet with the lettering Stadt Erlangen, created in 1976 by the Munich designer Walter Tafelmaier, who graphically implemented the motto "Erlangen – open by tradition", as a distinctive mark alongside the city coat of arms. On a square ground plan, 24 individual squares are arranged in five vertical and horizontal rows in such a way that a free space is left out in the middle of the right-hand side. The city signet symbolises the ground plan of the baroque planned city, the missing square stands for the openness of the city. According to the city encyclopaedia, the signet and motto recall "the repeated admission of refugees and immigrants from within Germany and abroad and their great importance for the development of the community".

In 2007, following the suggestion of the Lord Mayor, there were considerations to reinstate the coat of arms for representational purposes. However, according to online surveys, this was rejected by the majority of citizens and was subsequently not pursued further.

== International relations ==
Erlangen is the base of the Deutsch-Französisches Institut.

=== Twin towns – sister cities ===
Erlangen is twinned with:

- Beşiktaş, Turkey (2003)
- Bolzano, Italy (2018)
- Eskilstuna, Sweden (1961)
- Jena, Germany (1987)
- Rennes, France (1964)
- Riverside, United States (2013)
- San Carlos, Nicaragua (1989)
- Stoke-on-Trent, United Kingdom (1989)
- Umhausen, Austria (2006)
- Vladimir, Russia (1983)

=== Further partnerships ===
Erlangen also cooperates with:

- Most, Czech Republic (1949)
- Shenzhen, China (1997)
- Cumiana, Italy (2001)

== Economy ==
In 2016, Erlangen, within the city limits, achieved a gross domestic product (GDP) of €10.003 billion and thus occupied 36th place in the ranking of German cities according to economic performance. The GDP per capita in the same year was €91,531 (Bavaria: €44,215 / Germany €38,180 ) and was the fourth highest of all independent cities in Germany. In 2016 there were about 113,200 people employed in the city. The unemployment rate was 3.4% in December 2018 and thus above the Bavarian average of 2.7%.

The economy in Erlangen is essentially shaped by the activities of Siemens AG and its affiliated companies, as well as by the Friedrich-Alexander-University. As a business location, the city is one of the most attractive in Germany. In an analysis of the competitiveness of all 402 German independent cities and districts conducted by the Swiss company Prognos in 2016, the city ranked 6th (2013: 3rd). The city achieved far above-average values, particularly in terms of growth.

=== The economy before the foundation of the Huguenot city in 1686 ===
Until the foundation of the Neustadt in 1686 by Margrave Christian Ernst, the economy of Erlangen consisted almost exclusively of agriculture. The floodplains of the rivers Regnitz and Schwabach offered good locations for fields and meadows, which were irrigated by water wheels. The rivers themselves offered opportunities for fishing. The forest east of the Regnitz, including the quarries located there, formed an essential basis of life for the early citizens of Erlangen for centuries. The castle hill favoured the cultivation of fruit and wine due to its climate. Beekeeping was also practised around the town.

In addition to agriculture, there was a small-scale industry producing for local needs. Thus in 1619 a barber, a cooper, a glazier, a locksmith, a blacksmith, a carpenter, a wainwright, a bricklayer, two butchers, two millers, two shoemakers, three carpenters, five bakers, five tailors, five stonemasons, eight clothiers and several innkeepers and brewmasters offered their services in Erlangen.

The recurrent warlike events proved to be devastating for the economic development. As Erlangen was completely destroyed in the Thirty Years' War, the population was wiped out or expelled.

=== The development of commerce 1686 to 1812 ===
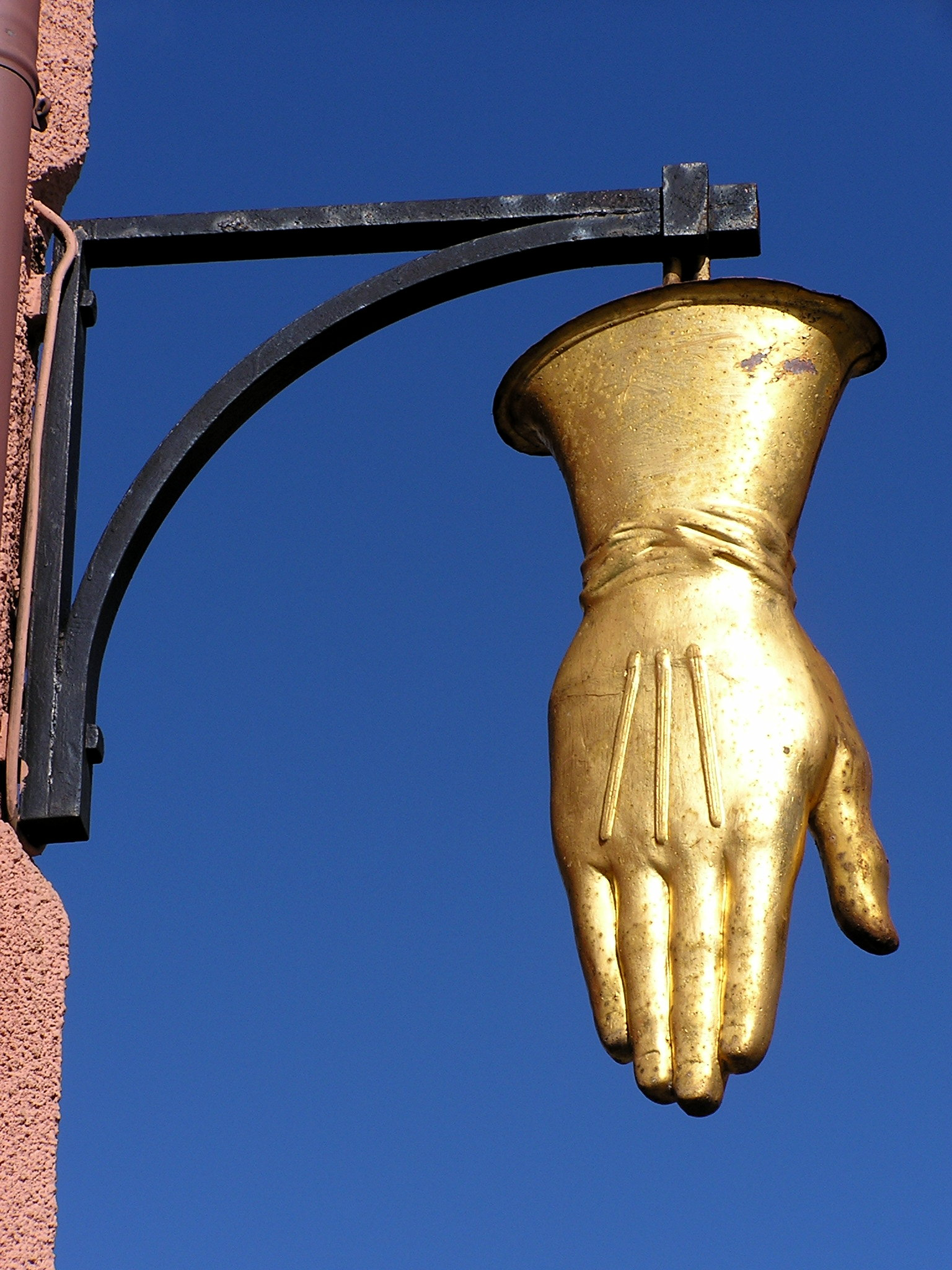
Symbol of the glove manufactory founded in 1686 by J. P. Gills and J. Mengin on the corner of Goethestr. and Bahnhofsplatz

After the disastrous consequences of the Thirty Years' War, Margrave Christian Ernst endeavoured to revive the economy, which had been completely devastated. He therefore had wealthy or economically efficient Huguenots recruited (who were not accepted in Neustadt an der Aisch) and settled them in the newly founded Huguenot city (Neustadt) in 1686. This active economic policy initially helped to establish the stocking makers' trade, a technically advanced branch of industry that was virtually unknown in Germany. In addition, hat manufacture, glove production and white tanning developed into important branches of industry.

Initially almost exclusively in French hands, these trades became increasingly German due to German immigration. Thus in 1775, of the total of 277 master stocking makers, only 19 were still of French origin. Only the glove-making and white tannery remained French monopolies until 1811. With the German immigration, other branches of trade came to Erlangen, such as calico printing, which also gained supra-regional importance and was one of the largest businesses in Erlangen at the end of the 18th century.

Due to the export-oriented economy of the Huguenot town, Erlangen was considered a "factory town", a type that was also represented in Franconia by Fürth and Schwabach.

=== Industrialization 1812–1945 ===
The reorganization of Central Europe after the Napoleonic Wars and the subsequent protectionist tariff policy led to the loss of traditional sales markets and thus to the decline of Erlangen's industries. By 1887, stocking manufacture had practically ceased. The calico factories and hat factories also disappeared. Only tanners and glove makers were able to survive into the 20th century.

In the middle of the 19th century, the Erlangen economy slowly consolidated at a low level. In addition to agriculture, the remaining commercial enterprises and local crafts, industry increasingly appeared as the fourth branch of the economy. Beer was the main product. The cellars in the Burgberg were excellently suited for maturing and storing the beers, resulting in a high-quality product that was in demand worldwide. At the end of 1860 Erlangen exported three times as much beer as Munich. The invention of the cooling machine at the beginning of the 1880s brought the high production levels to an abrupt end. Today there are only two breweries left in Erlangen.

In addition to the production of beer, the manufacture of combs became very important. With the help of the first steam engine of Erlangen the entrepreneur Johann Georg Bücking produced about 1.2 million combs in 1845. Thus the family business dominated the entire German, European and North American market. Another internationally active entrepreneur was Emil Kränzlein with his brush factory in the Östliche Stadtmauerstraße (Eastern Town Wall Street), which employed more than 400 people before the First World War and sold its products worldwide.

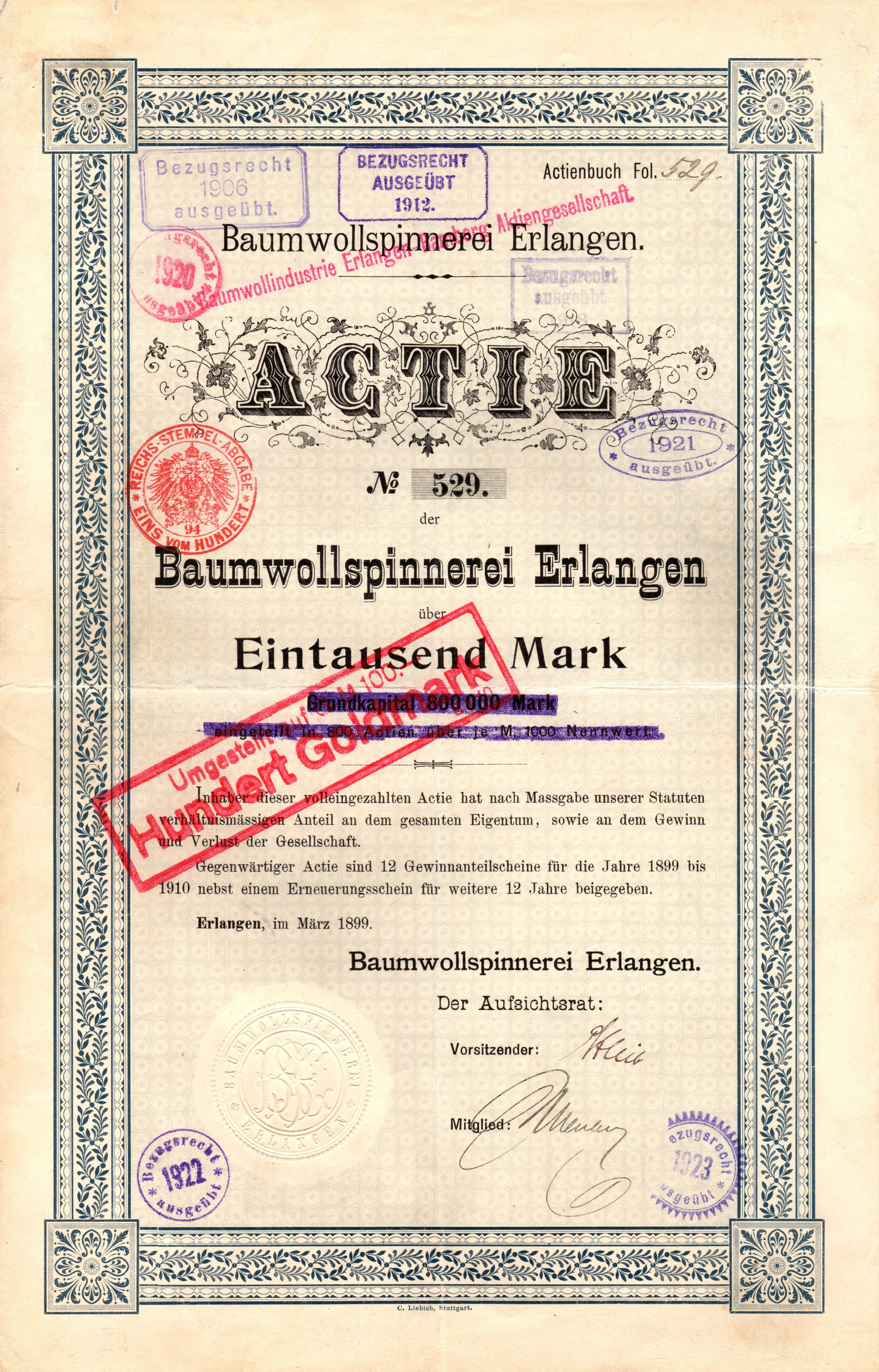
Share worth 1000 Marks of the Erlangen cotton spinning mill from March 1899

The foundation of the cotton mill Baumwollspinnerei AG in 1880 opened a new branch of industry in Erlangen. Through several mergers, the Baumwollindustrie Erlangen-Bamberg (ERBA) was created in 1927, employing over 5000 people before the Second World War.

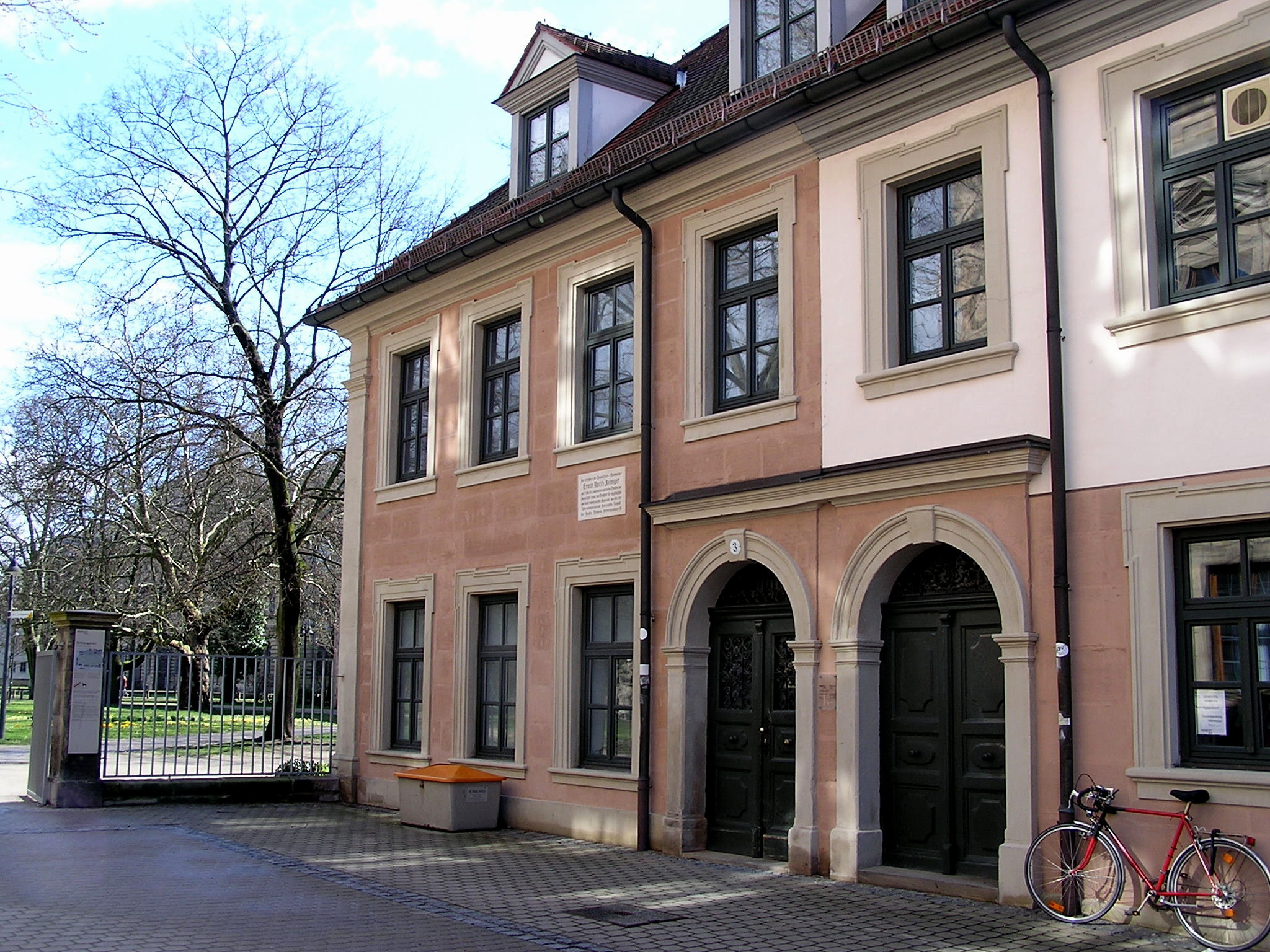
House at the castle square that formerly was the workshop of Erwin Moritz Reiniger

Another business that was essential for the future economic development of Erlangen was the workshop of the university mechanic Erwin Moritz Reiniger, in which he manufactured optical and precision mechanical devices from 1876. In 1886, this became the Reiniger, Gebbert & Schall company, which was already cooperating successfully with the medical faculty of the university. After the development of the X-ray machine in 1895 by Wilhelm Röntgen in Würzburg, Reiniger immediately contacted the company and agreed to manufacture X-ray equipment in his Erlangen factory. In 1925 Siemens & Halske AG acquired the company and incorporated its own department for medical technology. Before the Second World War, more than 2000 employees were already working at the Erlangen location of Siemens-Reiniger-Werke, whose central administration had already been relocated from Berlin to Erlangen in 1943. From 1947 onwards, the city was also the headquarters of the company from which today's Siemens Healthineers Sector of Siemens AG emerged.

From 1908, the pencil sharpener industry, which at times served 80% of the world market, also achieved global importance.

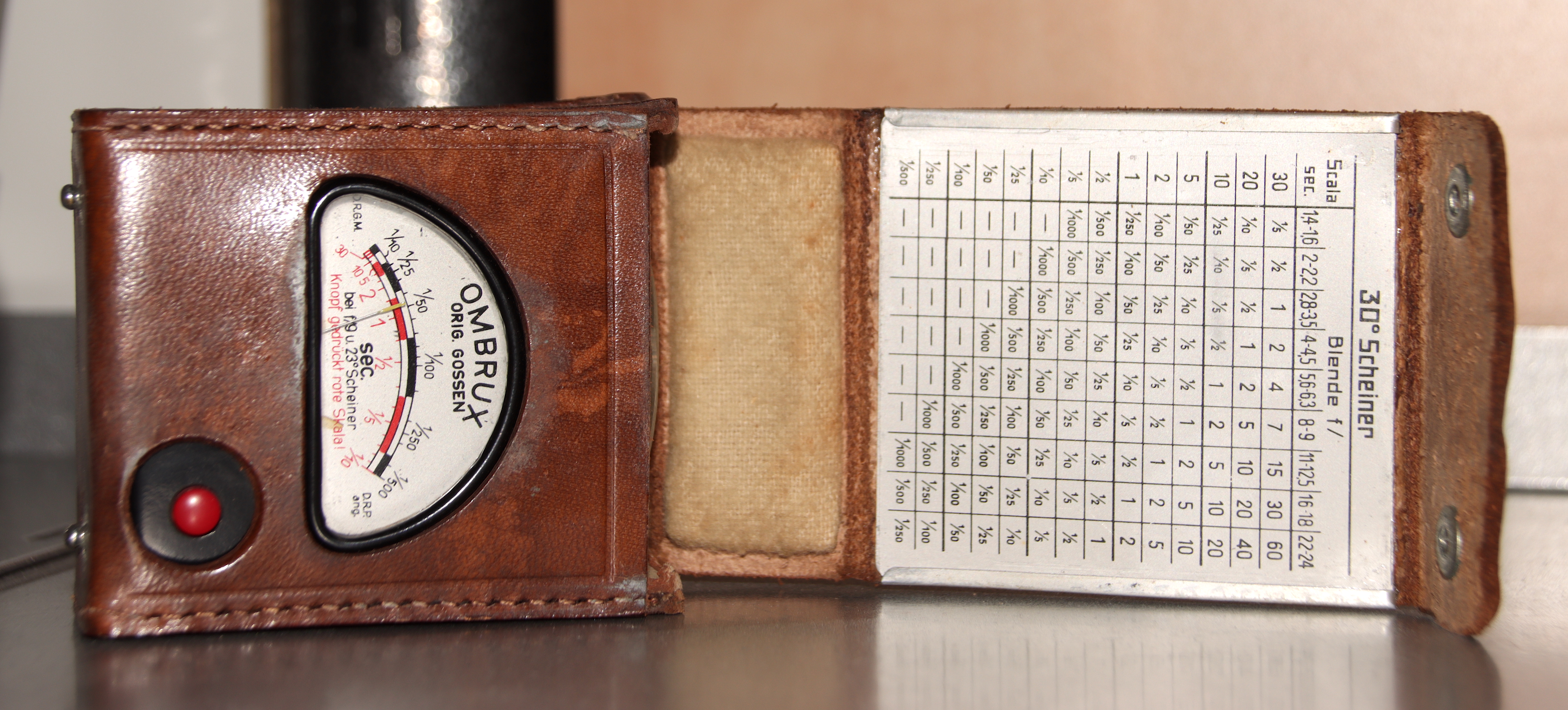
Photoelectric light exposure meter OMBRUX

In 1919 the entrepreneur Paul Gossen founded the Paul Gossen Co. K.-G., a factory of electrical measuring instruments in Baiersdorf, which moved its headquarters to Erlangen in the following year. The company mainly manufactured measuring instruments such as the world's first photoelectric exposure meter OMBRUX from 1933 onwards. The company building on Nägelsbachstraße, which still exists today, was erected between 1939 and 1943. In 1963 the company became part of Siemens AG. Today the Gossen company no longer exists.

=== Economic development caused by Siemens after 1945 ===
The end of the Second World War had far-reaching consequences for the Erlangen economy: The two Berlin-based Siemens companies Siemens & Halske (S&H) and Siemens-Schuckert Werke (SSW) had already taken measures for a new beginning before the foreseeable collapse. Special teams (so-called group management) were to prepare the move to Munich (S&H) and Hof (SSW). Due to the proximity to the Soviet zone, however, the Hof group around Günther Schabrowsky soon looked for a new location, which was found after several soundings in undamaged Erlangen. The fact that there was already a Siemens site in Erlangen in the form of Siemens-Reiniger-Werke played a major role in this search.

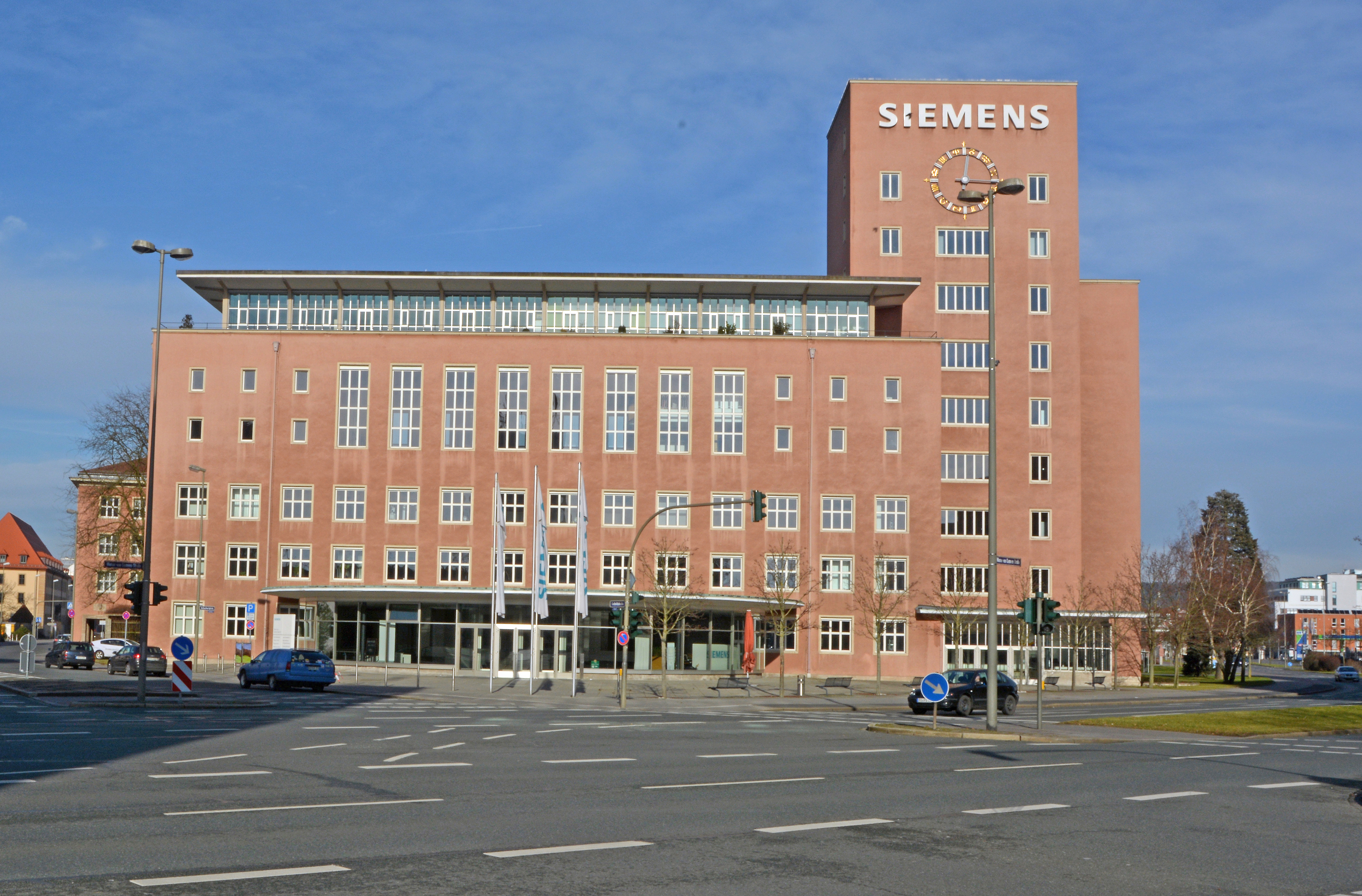
The Siemens administration building "Himbeerpalast" designed by Hans Hertlein

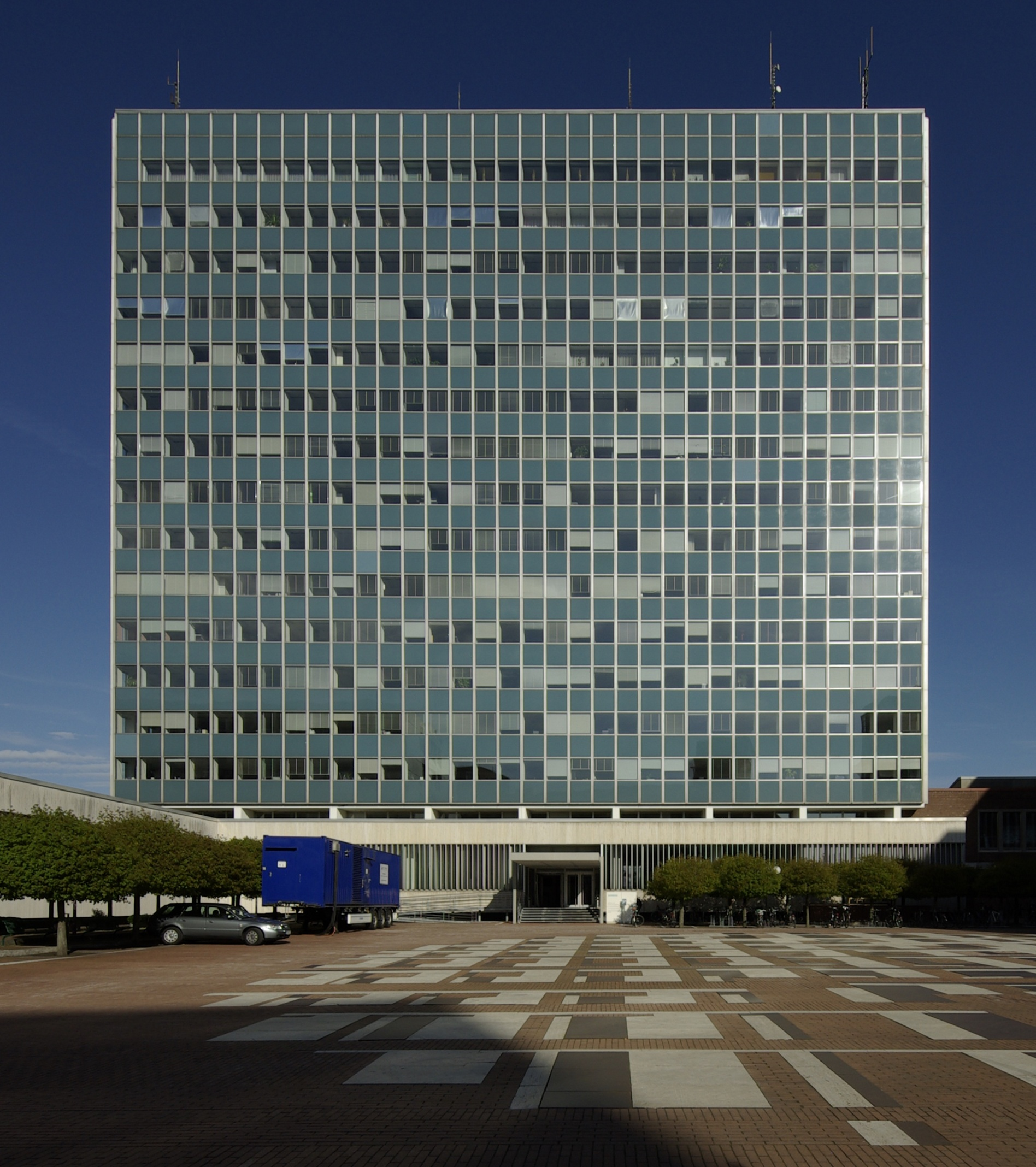
Administrative high-rise "Glass Palace" by Hans Maurer

It was started on 25 June 1945 with an advance team of two men. At the beginning of 1946 there were already 200 SSW employees, who were distributed over 15 locations due to the shortage of space. To remedy the situation, the new Siemens administration building, also known as the "Raspberry Palace" because of its color, was erected in 1948–1953 according to plans by Hans Hertlein on what was then the largest construction site in southern Germany. Large housing estates were built south of it for the employees. In the following years further office buildings were constructed: The Bingelhaus (1956–1958), the "Glaspalast" (Glass Palace) administration tower designed by Hans Maurer (Architect) (1959–1962) and the Siemens Research Center (1959–1968). In no other Bavarian city was as much and as long built after the Second World War as in Erlangen.

In 1956 SSW employed more than 6,000 people, in 1966 already more than 10,000. The merger of the three Siemens companies SSW, SRW and S&H to form Siemens AG in 1966 caused a renewed economic boost. Between 1985 and 1995 alone, the company invested one billion DM in the Erlangen site. The number of employees reached its highest level to date in 1986 with 31,000. Due to relocations to Nuremberg-Moorenbrunn and Forchheim, the number of employees today is approximately 24,000 (as of 30 September 2011). In addition to the Siemens Healthcare Sector (medical technology), the Industry (automation and drive technology), Energy (power generation, power transmission and distribution) and Infrastructure & Cities Sectors (mobility, rail technology, smart grid technology) and numerous staff departments are represented in Erlangen. In the 1970s there was a 900 m-long (3,000 ft) Maglev line on the research site, on which the Erlangen test vehicle (EET 01) was running. After the departure of the American troops, the new Röthelheimpark district was built on the vacated site, where Siemens Medizintechnik (Siemens Medical Technology) built further production facilities and office buildings. The Reiniger und Schall building, which housed the core of the Medizintechnik Group after the Second World War, was donated to the city of Erlangen at the end of 2000 to mark the city's upcoming anniversary. In addition to municipal departments, since March 2012 it has housed the "Siemens Unternehmensarchiv für medizinische Technik" (Siemens Company Archive for Medical Technology), which visualizes the history of this Siemens Division in an exhibition area (opening 2013).

The residential area "Im Museumswinkel" has been located on the remaining area of the former company grounds since 2008.

Numerous other Siemens subsidiaries and Siemens holdings are also located in Erlangen.

=== Other internationally active businesses ===
Through the merger of Siemens' and Areva's nuclear division, the subsequent withdrawal of Siemens AG from the program and Areva's focus on the nuclear business, Erlangen became the headquarters of AREVA GmbH with 3,350 employees at the site.

Additionally, Solar Millennium, another globally active company in the energy sector, had established itself in Erlangen. Solar Millennium was founded in 1998 and planned and constructed solar power plants based on parabolic trough technology. The company has been insolvent since 2011.

Publicis is a multinational advertising service provider with headquartered in France and is the third-largest advertising service provider worldwide. The Erlangen branch was the largest in Germany before being dissolved in 2019.

KUM GmbH & Co KG was the second oldest manufacturer of pencil sharpeners and is today internationally active as a manufacturer of school and office supplies.

Valeo Siemens eAutomotive, a manufacturer of components for electric cars, was founded in 2016 and is based in Erlangen.

The large German shipping line Hapag-Lloyd, headquartered in Hamburg, has named some of their vessels 'Erlangen Express', to honour the importance of Erlangen's industry and trade.

=== Key aspects of current economic policy ===
==== Promotion of business start-ups and innovative technologies ====
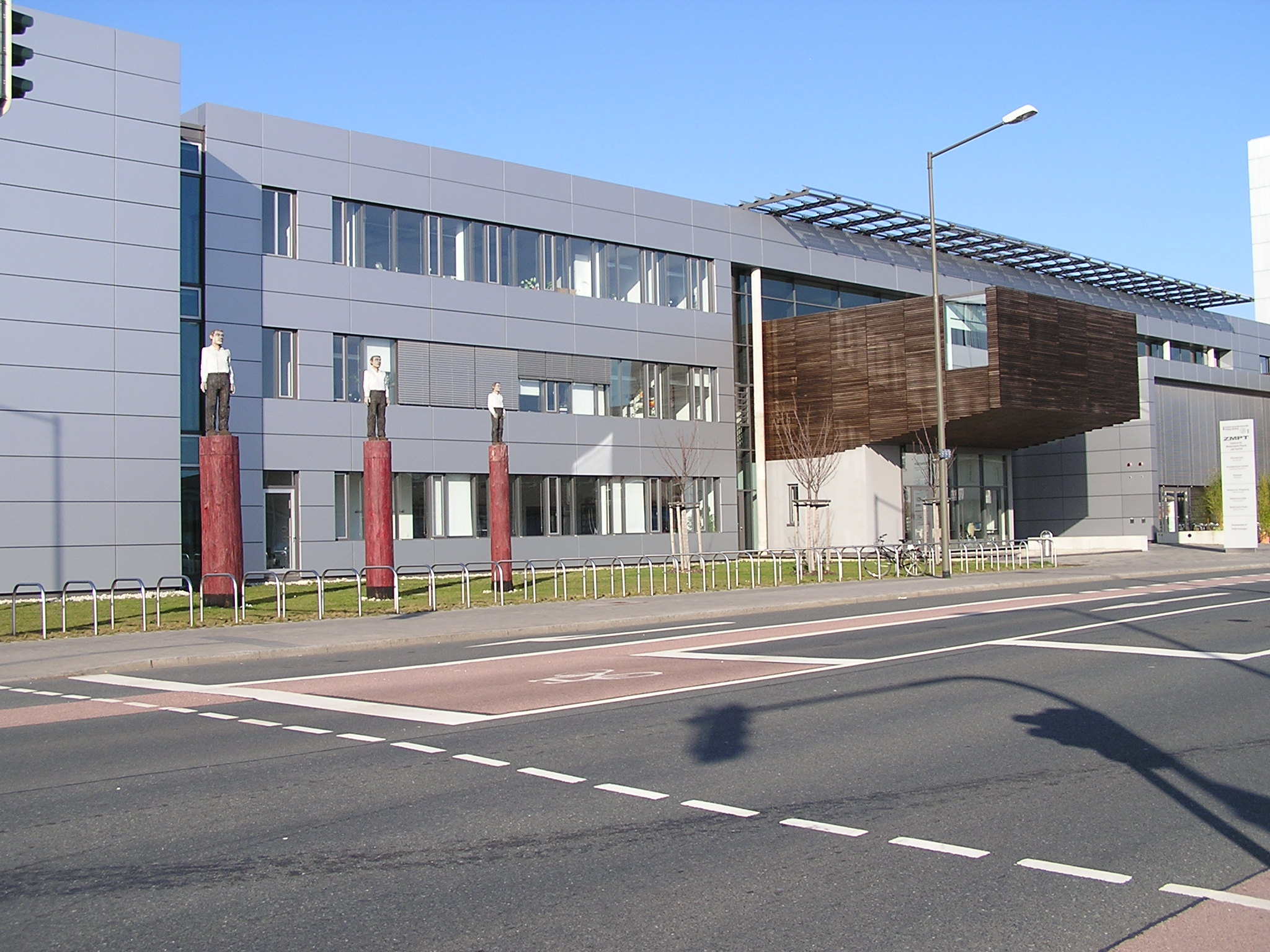
The IZMP in the Henkestraße

The promotion of progress and innovation and the creation of an investment-friendly environment have a long tradition in Erlangen. Thus, the Innovations- und Gründerzentrum Nürnberg-Fürth-Erlangen GmbH (IGZ) (Innovation and Start-up Centre Nuremberg-Fürth-Erlangen) was founded in Tennenlohe in 1985/86 together with the cities of Fürth and Nuremberg. New companies emerged from this start-up centre, which set new impulses for economic life and were later successfully placed on the stock exchange. These include WaveLight AG and November AG.

In 2003, the IGZ was supplemented by the Medical Technology Innovation Center (IZMP), which supports in particular start-ups and innovative companies in the fields of medical technology, pharmaceutical research and biotechnology and genetic engineering. In March 2006 the foundation stone for a first extension of the IZMP was laid.

Furthermore, the "Erlangen AG" was founded as a union of science and economy with the aim of systematically and consistently developing new knowledge resources, showing ways into new markets and internationally marketing the positive differentiating features of the location.

As a result of many years of efforts to promote new, innovative technologies, Erlangen was the first Bavarian city to be awarded the title of most business-friendly municipality by the Bavarian state government in 1998.

==== Medicine and medical technology ====
A competence center for medicine, medical technology and the pharmaceutical industry was formed as a cooperation between the Friedrich-Alexander-University, the Waldkrankenhaus, the Klinikum am Europakanal, the Siemens Healthcare Division and over 100 medium-sized companies. Nearly one in four employees works in the medical technology and healthcare sectors. This locational advantage is to be further expanded in the future. The city has set itself the goal of becoming the German capital of medical research, production and services. In order to include the surrounding region in these efforts, the Medical Valley European Metropolitan Region Nuremberg was founded.

== Points of interest ==
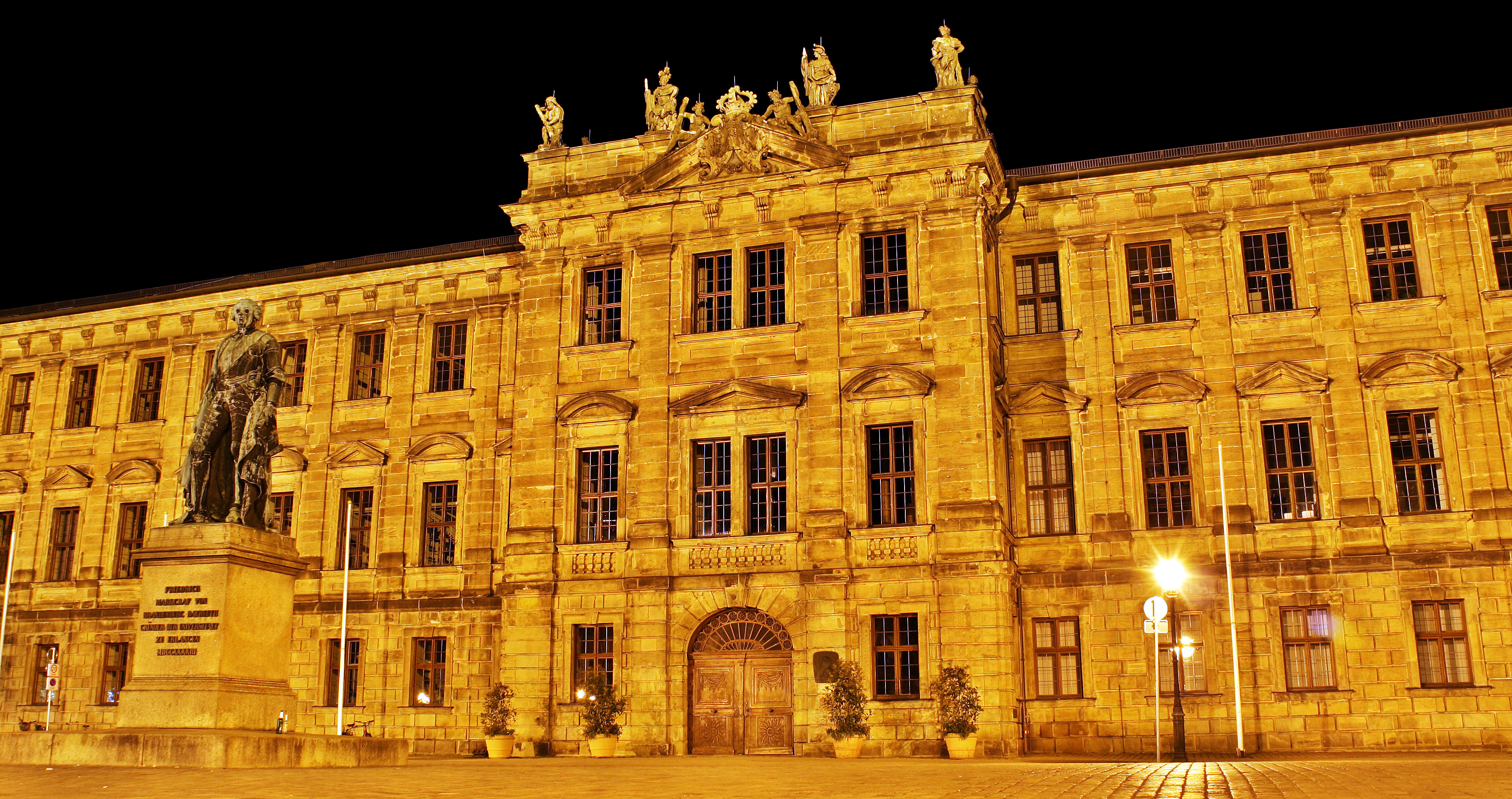
Erlangen palace

- The University of Erlangen-Nuremberg (Friedrich-Alexander-Universität) was founded in 1742 by Frederick, Margrave of Brandenburg-Bayreuth, in the city of Bayreuth, but was relocated to Erlangen the next year. Today, it features five faculties; some departments (Economics and Education) are located in Nuremberg. About 39,000 students study at this university, of which about 20,000 are located in Erlangen.
- Stadtmuseum Erlangen, a museum about Erlangen's history, located in the former Old Town city hall.
- The Botanischer Garten Erlangen is a botanical garden maintained by the university.
- The Zentralfriedhof (or Central Cemetery) is the largest cemetery in the city with about 9,000 graves.

== Bergkirchweih ==
The Bergkirchweih is an annual beer festival, similar to the Oktoberfest in Munich but smaller in scale. It takes place during the twelve days before and after Pentecost (that is, 49 days after Easter); this period is called the "fifth season" by the locals. The beer is served at wooden tables in one-litre stoneware jugs under the trees of the "Berg", a small, craggy, and wooded hill with old caves (beer cellars) owned by local breweries. The cellars extend for 21 kilometres (13 mi) throughout the hill (the "Berg") and maintain a constant cool underground temperature. Until Carl von Linde invented the electric refrigerator in 1871, this was considered to be the largest refrigerator in Southern Germany.

The beer festival draws more than one million visitors annually. It features carnival rides of high tech quality, food stalls of most Franconian dishes, including bratwurst, suckling pig, roasted almonds, and giant pretzels.

It is commonly known by local residents as the "Berchkärwa" (pronounced "bairch'-care-va") or simply the "Berch", like in "Gehma auf'n Berch!" ("Let's go up the mountain!").

This is an outdoor event frequented and enjoyed by Franconians. Despite a relatively high number of visitors, it is not commonly known by tourists, or people living outside Bavaria.

== Environmental protection ==
Environmental protection and nature conservation have enjoyed a high status in Erlangen since the beginning of the environmental movement in Germany in the early 1970s. A number of national and international awards attest to the success of these efforts. In 1988 the city was awarded the title "Partner of the European Environmental Year 1987/88" and in 1990 and 1991 the title "Federal Capital for Nature and Environmental Protection". The year 2007 was proclaimed the environmental year by the city administration with the motto "Natürlich ERLANGEN" (German for "natural/organic Erlangen"). One focus is the expansion of photovoltaics. From 2003 to 2011, the installed capacity of photovoltaic systems in Erlangen has increased more than twentyfold to 16,700 kW, covering more than 2.0% of Erlangen's electricity requirements annually. Erlangen participates in the so-called Solarbundesliga (Federal Solar League). In the competition between cities, Erlangen reached third place in 2012 and second in the European Solar League.

Since 2007, Erlangen has been the first city in Germany in which every school has its own solar power system installed. The data of the solar systems at the schools are presented in the so-called climate protection school atlas on the Internet. In 2011, a solar city map was set up on the Internet in which installed solar systems could be entered.

=== Nature and landscape conservation ===
In the city area, two areas have been declared nature reserves (NSG) and thus enjoy the highest protection for plants and animals in accordance with Article 7 of the Bavarian Nature Conservation Act. These are:

- The Brucker Lache wetland biotope, designated a nature reserve in 1964, was extended in 1984 from its original 76 ha to 110 ha. To the south of the nature reserve lies the Tennenlohe Forest Experience Centre, one of nine forest experience centres run by the Bavarian Forest Administration.
- The nature reserve Exerzierplatz, a 25 ha sandy biotope, which was established in October 2000 is part of the Franconian sand axis.

In addition to the nature reserves, Erlangen has 21 landscape reserves with a total area of 3538 ha, i.e. almost half of the entire city area. In contrast to nature reserves, these focus on the protection of special landscapes and their recreational value as well as the preservation of an efficient natural balance. Landscape reserves include:

- The Holzweg (German for wooden path) in Büchenbach, a traditional connection path between Büchenbach and the Mönau forest area, where the inhabitants of Büchenbach supplied themselves with wood for centuries. This has created a hollow path sunken lane edges are overgrown with species-rich low-nutrient grassland vegetation.
- The Calcareous grassland on the so-called "Riviera", a footpath along the Schwabach (Rednitz). This area was declared a protected landscape area at the beginning of 2000.
- The Hutgraben Winkelfelder and Wolfsmantel (186 ha), a watercourse springing in a slope basin west of Kalchreuth, which flows into the Regnitz west of Eltersdorf. This area was declared a protected landscape area in 1983.
- The Bimbachtal, located in southwestern Büchenbach, was declared a landscape conservation area in 1983.
- The 56 ha sized area of Grünau
- The area around the Great Bishop's Pond (Dechsendorfer Weiher) (169 ha)
- The Mönau (570 ha)
- The Dechsendorf Lohe (70 ha)
- The Seebachgrund (112 ha)
- The Moorbach valley (50 ha)
- The Regnitz valley (883 ha)
- The Meilwald forest with ice pit (224 ha)
- The Schwabach valley (66 ha)
- The Steinforst ditch with the Kosbach pond and permanent forest strip east of the Rhine–Main–Danube Canal (157 ha)
- The Rittersbach creek (66 ha)
- The preservation strip on both sides of the A3 motorway (47 ha)
- The monastery forest (197 ha)
- The Aurach valley (182 ha)
- Römerreuth and surroundings (110 ha)
- The Bachgraben ditch (9 ha)
- The Brucker Lache (331 ha)

== Transportation ==
Erlangen lies at Bundesautobahn 3, Bundesautobahn 73 and Bundesstraße 4.

=== Public transportation ===
The city has an extensive bus network. It is planning a light rail system called Stadt-Umland-Bahn (StUB) which is to be opened at the end of the decade. Erlangen is served by the Nuremberg S-Bahn Line 1. With the use of natural gas buses in public transport, the Erlangen municipal utilities have also made a contribution to reducing CO_{2} emissions and particulate matter. Furthermore, there have been pushes from both SPD and CSU politicians to introduce electric buses into the city's fleet. However, despite both Nuremberg and Fürth having already introduced such vehicles, there are no concrete plans for Erlangen to follow suit.

=== Air transportation ===
The city is served by Nuremberg Airport, located 15.6 km (10 mi) south of Erlangen. The airport provides direct routes to other parts of Germany, Europe and Turkey.

=== Railway ===
Erlangen lies at Nuremberg–Bamberg railway. There was a railway connecting the city with Herzogenaurach which was closed in the 1980s. Erlangen Hauptbahnhof (central station) is the only station served by Intercity Express trains, regional (S-Bahn trains) also serve three other stations along the main railway: Erlangen-Bruck station, Erlangen-Eltersdorf station and Erlangen-Paul-Gossen-Straße.

=== Bicycles ===
As early as the 1970s the groundwork was being laid for today's high share of bicycles in total traffic through a bicycle-friendly transport policy of then mayor Dietmar Hahlweg. He paid particular attention to the introduction of cycling lanes on pedestrian paths. Throughout the entire population the bicycle is a common means of transport. Cyclists wearing suits and carrying briefcases are not an unusual sight. In the past, Erlangen and Münster regularly fought over the title of the most bicycle-friendly city in Germany.

=== Water transport ===
A canal was opened in 1843. In 1992, a new canal opened, creating a connection between the Black Sea and the North Sea via Danube and Rhine River. The old canal was turned into the A73 motorway.

== Sport ==
The city's main sports club is HC Erlangen who play in the top division. However, they have played their home games at Arena Nürnberg since 2014 due to having no suitable venue for Bundesliga level Handball in Erlangen.

The city also has several lower league football teams; FSV Erlangen-Bruck, BSC Erlangen and SC Eltersdorf.

The former army barracks had a baseball diamond for use by the soldiers and their families which was kept in place after the garrison left and is now used by the Erlangen White Sox. The Erlangen Sharks are a local American football team that plays on an adjacent grass field also used by other parts of Spielvereinigung Erlangen to which both the Sharks and the White Sox belong.

== Notable people ==
Though a small village for much of its history and now only a small city of only 100k inhabitants, Erlangen has made significant contributions to the world, primarily through its many Lutheran theologians, to its University of Erlangen-Nuremberg scholars, and the Siemens pioneers in science and technology.

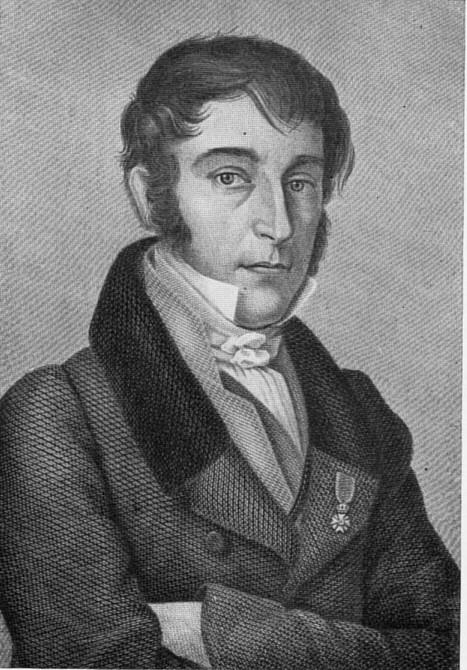
Carl Friedrich Philipp von Martius

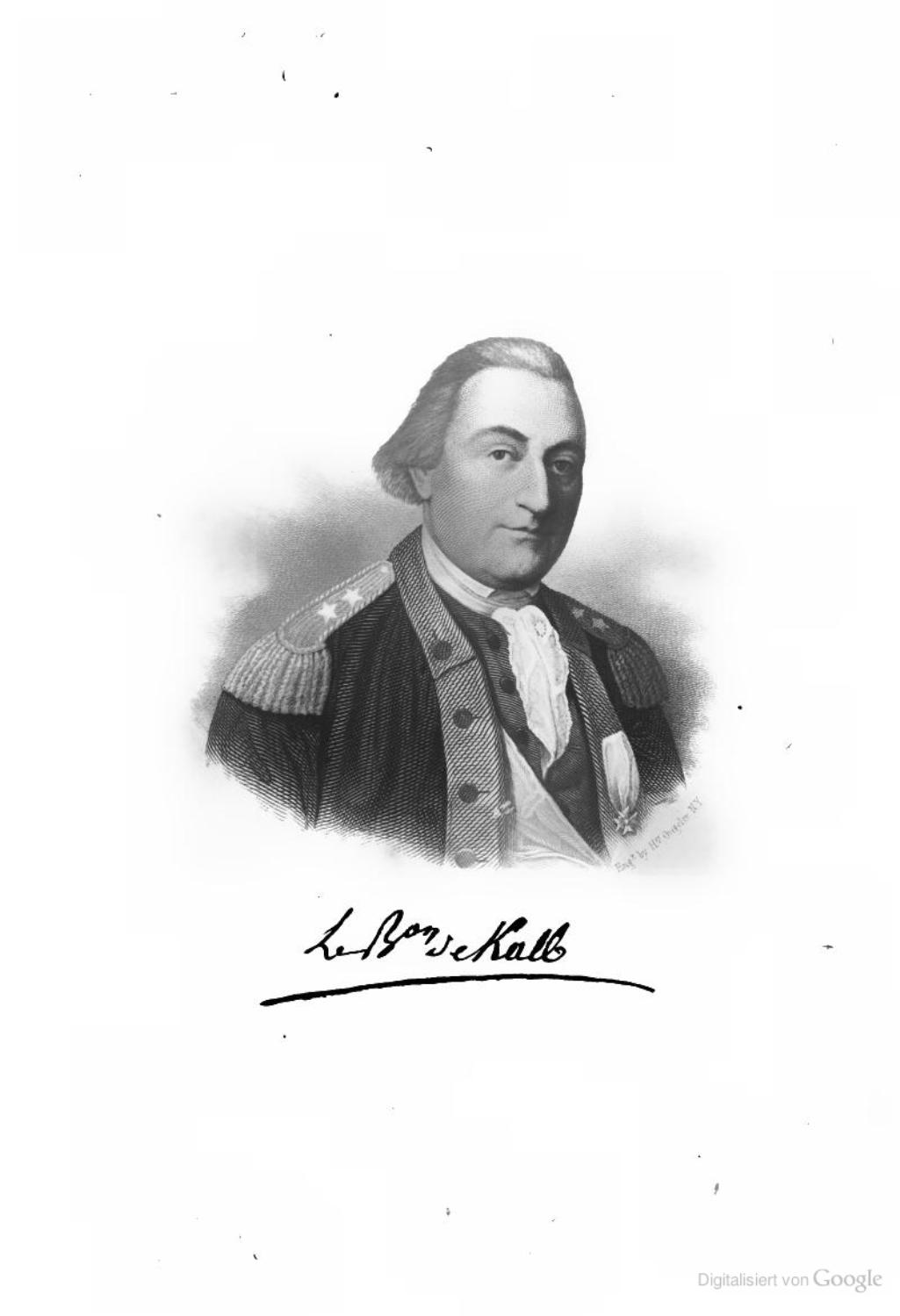
Johann von Kalb

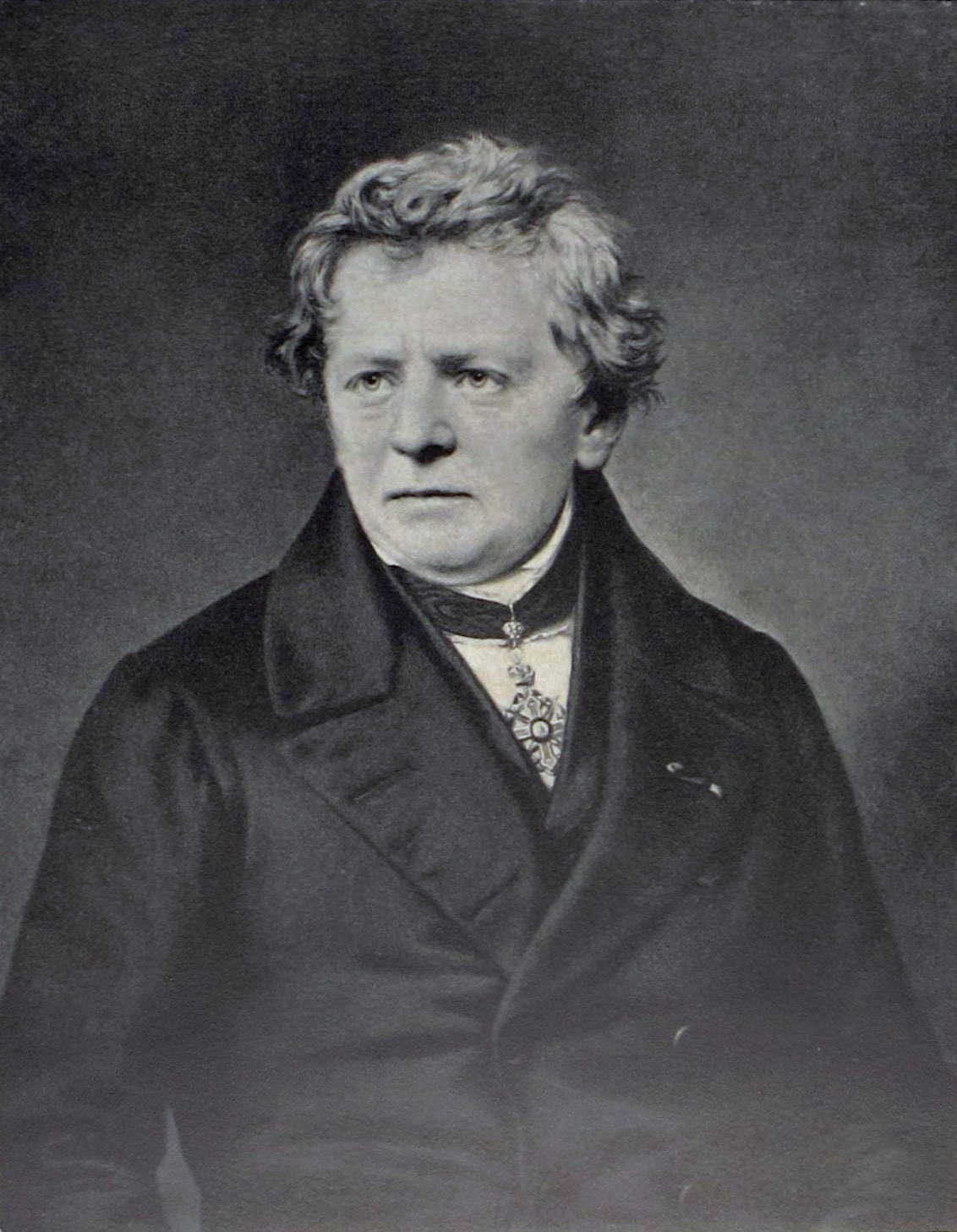
Georg Simon Ohm

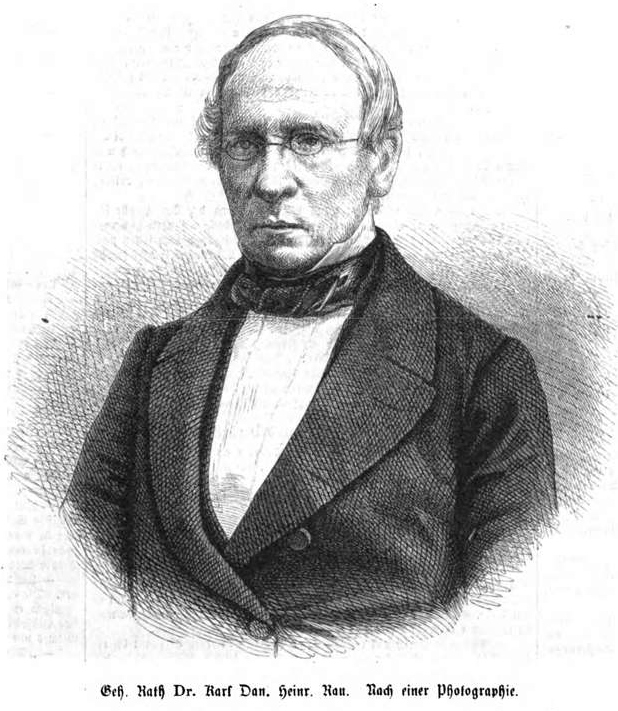
Karl Heinrich Rau

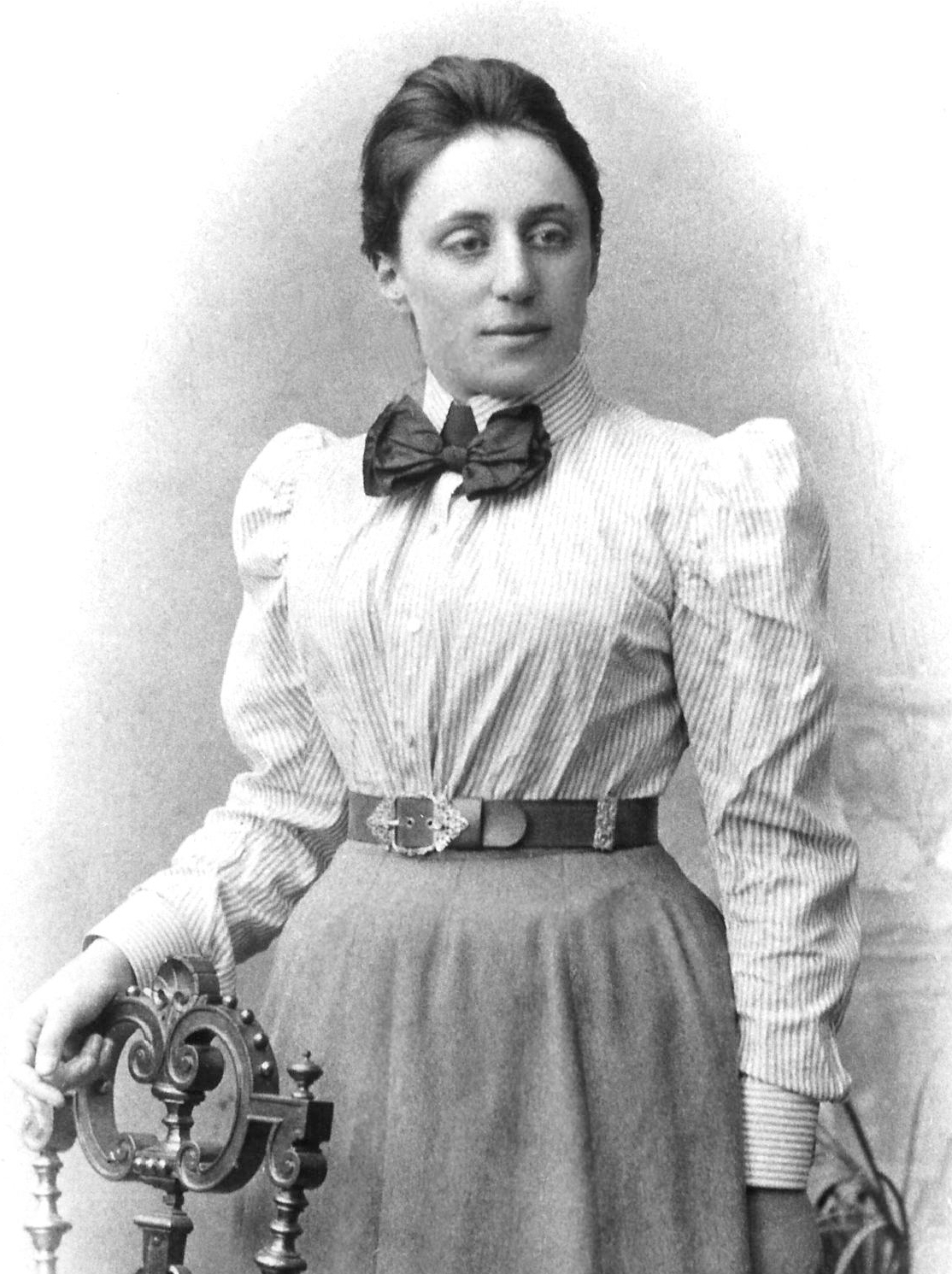
Emmy Noether

Among its noted residents are:

- Johann de Kalb (1721–1780), Soldier, War of Austrian Succession, Seven Years' War, Major General in the American Revolutionary War, namesake of many American towns
- Philipp Ludwig Statius Müller (1725–1776), zoologist, known to the classification of several new species, especially birds
- Johann Christian Daniel von Schreber (1739–1810), naturalist
- Eugenius Johann Christoph Esper (1742–1810), scientist, botanist, first to begin research into Paleopathology
- Johann Schweigger (1779–1857), chemist, physicist, mathematician, named "Chlorine", and invented the Galvanometer
- August Friedrich Schweigger (1783–1921), botanist, zoologist, known for taxonomy including the discovery of several turtle species
- Georg Ohm (1789–1854), German scientist, famous for Ohm's law regarding electric current, and the measurement unit Ohm
- Karl Heinrich Rau (1792–1870), economist, published an influential encyclopedia of all "relevant" economic knowledge of his time
- Carl Friedrich Philipp von Martius (1794–1868), botanist, explorer, famous expedition into Brazil (1817–1820)
- Adolph Wagner (1835–1917), economist, founding proponent of Academic Socialism and State Socialism
- Paul Zweifel (1848–1927), gynecologist, proved that the fetus was metabolically active, paving the way for new fetal research
- Elias Oechsler (1850–1917), composer, music instructor at the University of Erlangen–Nuremberg
- Emmy Noether (1882–1935), mathematician, groundbreaking work on abstract algebra and theoretical physics
- Fritz Noether (1884–1941), mathematician, political prisoner, younger brother of Emmy Noether, imprisoned in Soviet Russia
- Ernst Penzoldt (1892–1955), artist, famous German author, painter, and sculptor
- Eduard Hauser (soldier) (1895–1961), German officer, general in World War II
- Hans-Jürgen Stammer (1899–1968 in Erlangen), German zoologist, ecologist and Zoological Institute director of the University Erlangen.
- Heinrich Welker (1912–1981), theoretical physicist, made numerous inventions in the early electrical engineering fields
- Rudolf Fleischmann (1903–2002), scientist, nuclear physicist, member of the Uranium Club, theorist on isotope separation
- Bernhard Plettner (1914–1997), electrical engineer and Business Administration, CEO for Siemens AG (1971–1981)
- Helmut Zahn (1916–2004), scientist, chemist, one of the first to discover the properties of Insulin
- Erhard Weller (1926–1986), actor
- Georg Nees (1926–2016), Graphic Artist, expanded ALGOL computer language, pioneer in digital art and sculptures
- Traudl Kleefeld (1936–2024), modern philologist, historian, author, awarded for her engagement in the Protestant Church
- Elke Sommer (born 1940), entertainer, Golden Globe Award-winning actress from television and film, early Playboy playmate
- Heinrich von Pierer (born 1941), Business Administration, CEO for Siemens AG (1992–2005), advisor to numerous governmental figures
- Gerhard Frey (born 1944), mathematician, worked on elliptic curve and helped prove Fermat's Last Theorem
- Karl Meiler (1949–2014), tennis player, moderately successful in Doubles Tennis in the 1970s.
- Willi Kalender (born 1949), medical physicist, pioneer in CT Scan technology and research into numerous diseases
- Karlheinz Brandenburg (born 1954), sound engineer, contributor to the invention of the format MPEG Audio Layer III, or MP3
- Klaus Täuber (born 1958), footballer, played for several Bundesliga teams from the mid-1970s–1980s, managed at lower levels
- Lothar Matthäus (born 1961), German Football legend, World Cup Winning Captain, Bayern Captain, first FIFA World Player of the Year
- Michael Buehl (born 1962), professor of chemistry, University of St Andrews, Scotland, UK
- Jürgen Teller (born 1964), fine art and fashion photography, worked for numerous magazines and designers, often with Björk
- Katrin Müller-Hohenstein (born 1965), journalist
- Hisham Zreiq (born 1968), award-winning Palestinian Christian Independent filmmaker, poet and visual artist
- Florian Schneeberger (1971–2026), Austrian sailor
- Peter Wackel (born 1977), singer, with 6 albums and over 25 singles, he has a niche singing Schlager musik
- Flula Borg (born 1982), entertainer, DJ, hip-hop artist, internet sensation, film critic
- Matthias Fischbach (born 1988), politician
- Carlos Händel (born 2007), hockey player for the Halifax Mooseheads
