= Fishback =

Fishback is a surname. Notable people with the surname include:

- Dan Fishback (born 1981), American performance artist, playwright and singer-songwriter
- Dominique Fishback (born 1991), American actor and playwright
- Fred Fishback (later credited as Fred Hibbard, 1894–1925), film director, screenwriter and producer of the silent era
- Ian Fishback, US Army officer, who wrote to Senator John McCain about the abuse of prisoners
- James Fishback (born 1995), American investor and political candidate
- Jeff Fishback (born 1941), American middle- and long-distance runner
- Joe Fishback (born 1967), football player
- Kurt Edward Fishback, American portrait photographer
- Margaret Fishback (1900–1985), American poet and prose author
- Price V. Fishback, economic historian
- William Meade Fishback (1831–1903), 17th Governor of Arkansas, US

== See also ==
- Fischbach
- Fischbachau
- Fischbacher
- Fischbeck
