= Nepenthe (restaurant) =

Restaurant in Big Sur, California

Coordinates: 36.2218173°N 121.761517°W

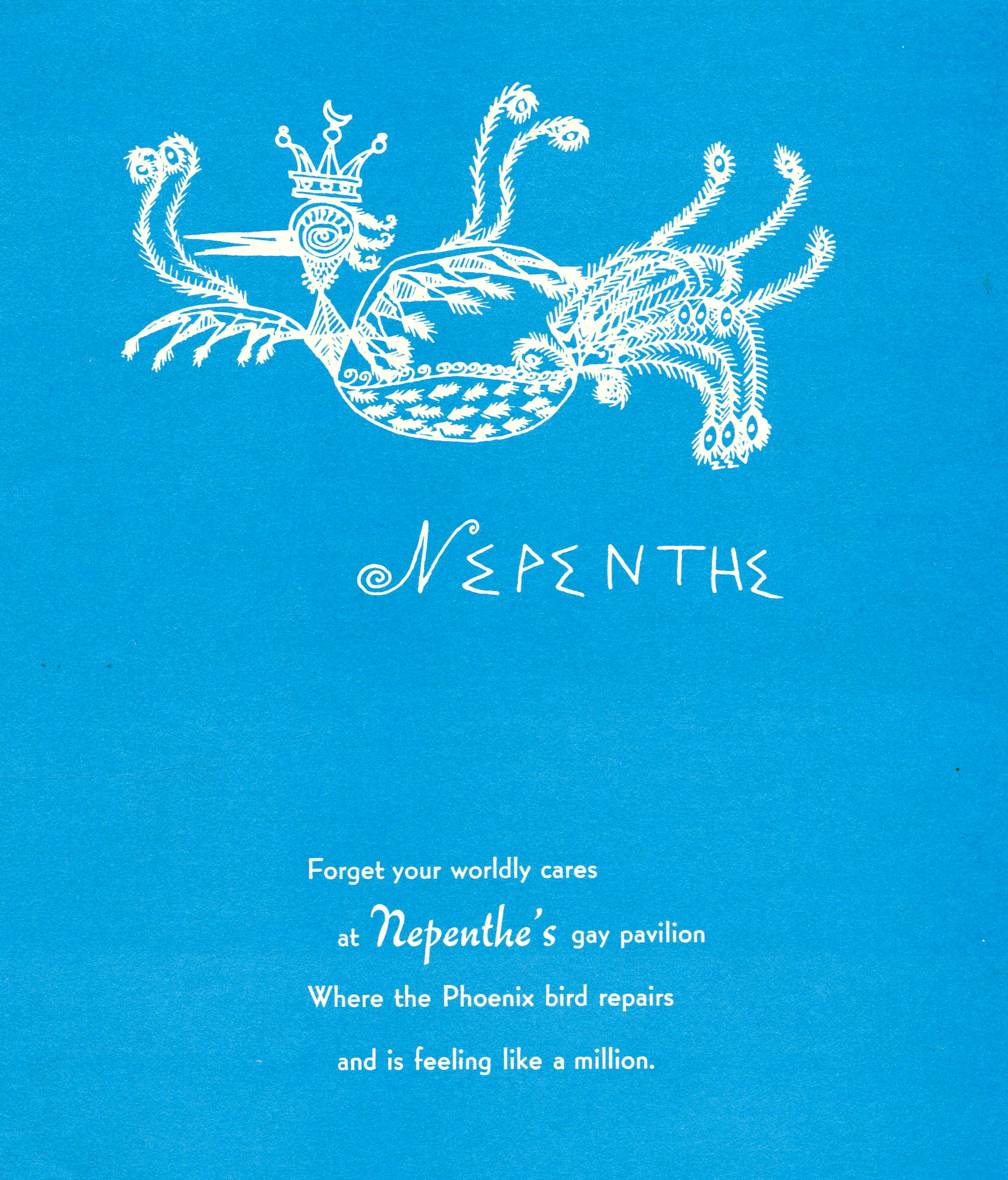
- Type: Private
- Industry: Restaurant; Gift shop
- Founded: April 24, 1949; 77 years ago in Big Sur, California, United States
- Founder: Bill and Lolly Fassett
- Area served: Big Sur
- Key people: Willie Nelson, Hunter S. Thompson
- Owner: Kirk Gafill, grandson of founders
- Number of employees: 135 (2017)
- Website: nepenthe.com

Nepenthe is a restaurant in Big Sur, California, built by Bill and Madelaine "Lolly" Fassett and first opened in 1949. It was built around a cabin first constructed in 1925. It is known for the miles-long panoramic view of the south coast of Big Sur from the outdoor terrace and its California/Greek Mediterranean menu featuring locally and California-grown food.

Orson Welles and his wife Rita Hayworth bought the cabin around which the restaurant is built from the Trail Club of Jolon on a whim as a romantic getaway. The couple measured the windows for curtains, but never returned. The Fassetts bought the cabin and surrounding land from Welles and Hayworth in 1947 for $22,000. They named the restaurant after a potion used by the ancient gods to induce forgetfulness from pain or sorrow.

The restaurant is located 29 miles (47 km) south of Carmel, California and about 800 feet (240 m) above the coast. The business has had to endure multiple closures of Highway 1 since its founding due to fire, floods, and mudslides.

The restaurant employs 105 people and maintains about 20 workforce housing units.

== History ==
In 1925, a group of Christian Scientists from Principia College in Elsah, Illinois came to California. They hired local master carpenter Sam Trotter to build a three-story log house on the edge of a cliff in Big Sur, which they planned to use as a private resort during horseback riding trips. They named the group the Coastland Trails Club (also known as the Trail Club of Jolon). By the early 1940s, they were no longer using the cabin and had rented it to a writer named Lynda Sargent. She invited author Henry Miller, who had arrived in Monterey penniless, to stay with her until he found his own place to rent.

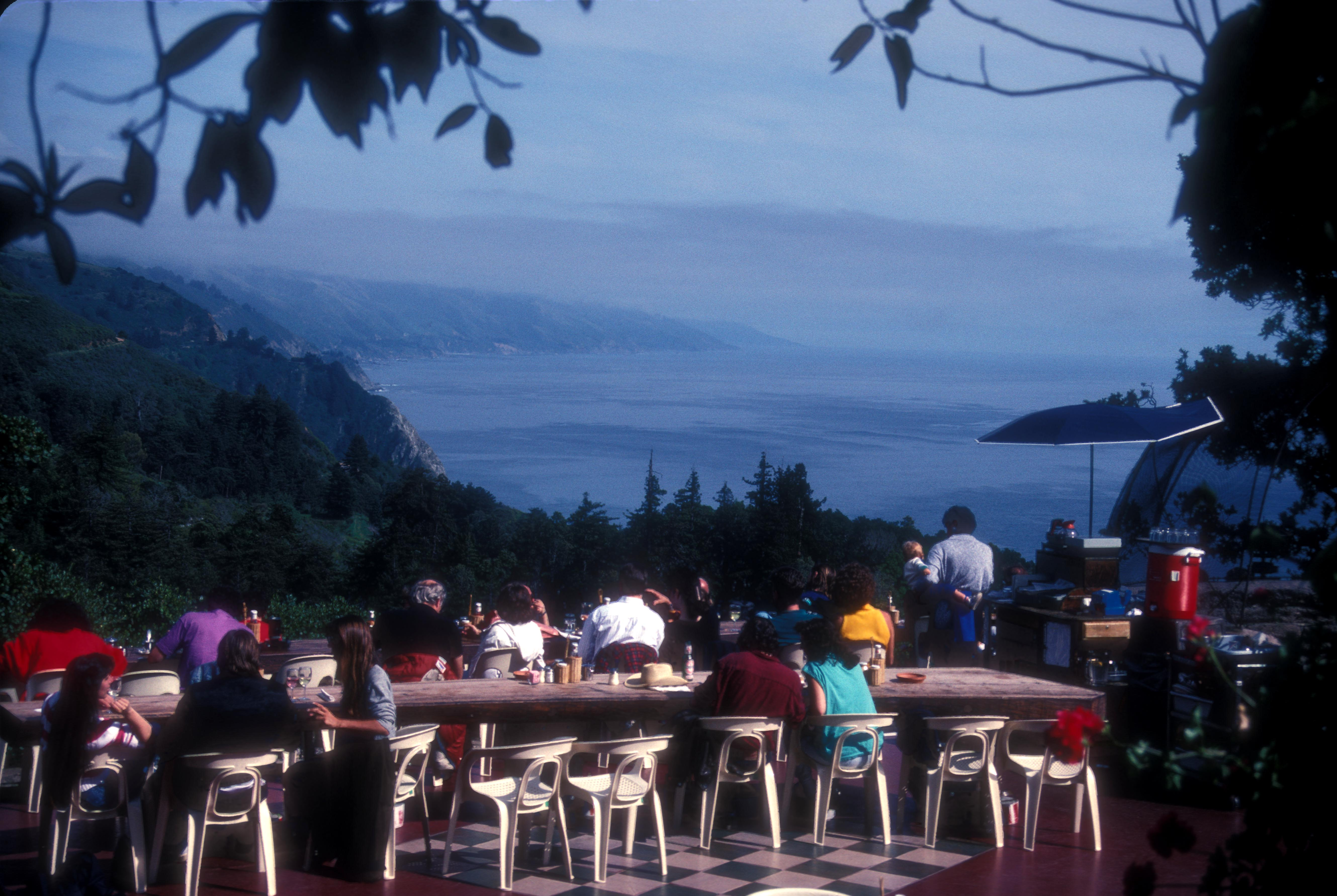
View from the terrace of the Nepenthe restaurant.

In May, 1944, during World War II, actor Orson Welles, chairman of the Fifth War Bond Drive, and his wife Rita Hayworth were in San Francisco to sell U.S. government War Bonds. Gas was rationed, and they were paid for their appearance with gas coupons. Traveling with their good friend and actor Joseph Cotten, they decided to use the coupons to drive back to Los Angeles along the scenic Highway 1. During their drive, they stopped to picnic and drove up an unmarked dirt road where they found a cabin on a hill perched above the south coast. They loved the view and found a realtor and learned they could buy it that day. Between the two of them, they produced a cash down payment of slightly more than $156.00 (another story says $167.00) to close the deal on the cabin and land. Hayworth measured the windows for curtains and a new stove and Welles considered laying gas pipe for use in the kitchen, but they were divorced in 1947 and never returned.

The Fassetts bought the cabin and the surrounding 12 acres (4.9 ha) from Welles and Hayworth after their divorce in 1947 for $22,000. The Fassetts moved into the three room cabin with their five children, including Frank NKA Kaffe Fassett. They hired architect Rowan Maiden, a student of Frank Lloyd Wright, to design the restaurant. They chose two sons of the original builder, Frank and Walter Trotter, to construct the restaurant using local materials including redwood and adobe bricks made by Lolly Fassett.

The modern restaurant kitchen is adjacent to the cabin's own kitchen. Nepenthe is well known for its Ambrosiaburger, a ground steak sandwich served on a French roll with a custom "Ambrosia Sauce." The menu features locally and California-grown products. The terrace dining tables have a long view over the coast to the south. The restaurant is known for its Bohemian look and feel, belly dancing, and poetry readings.

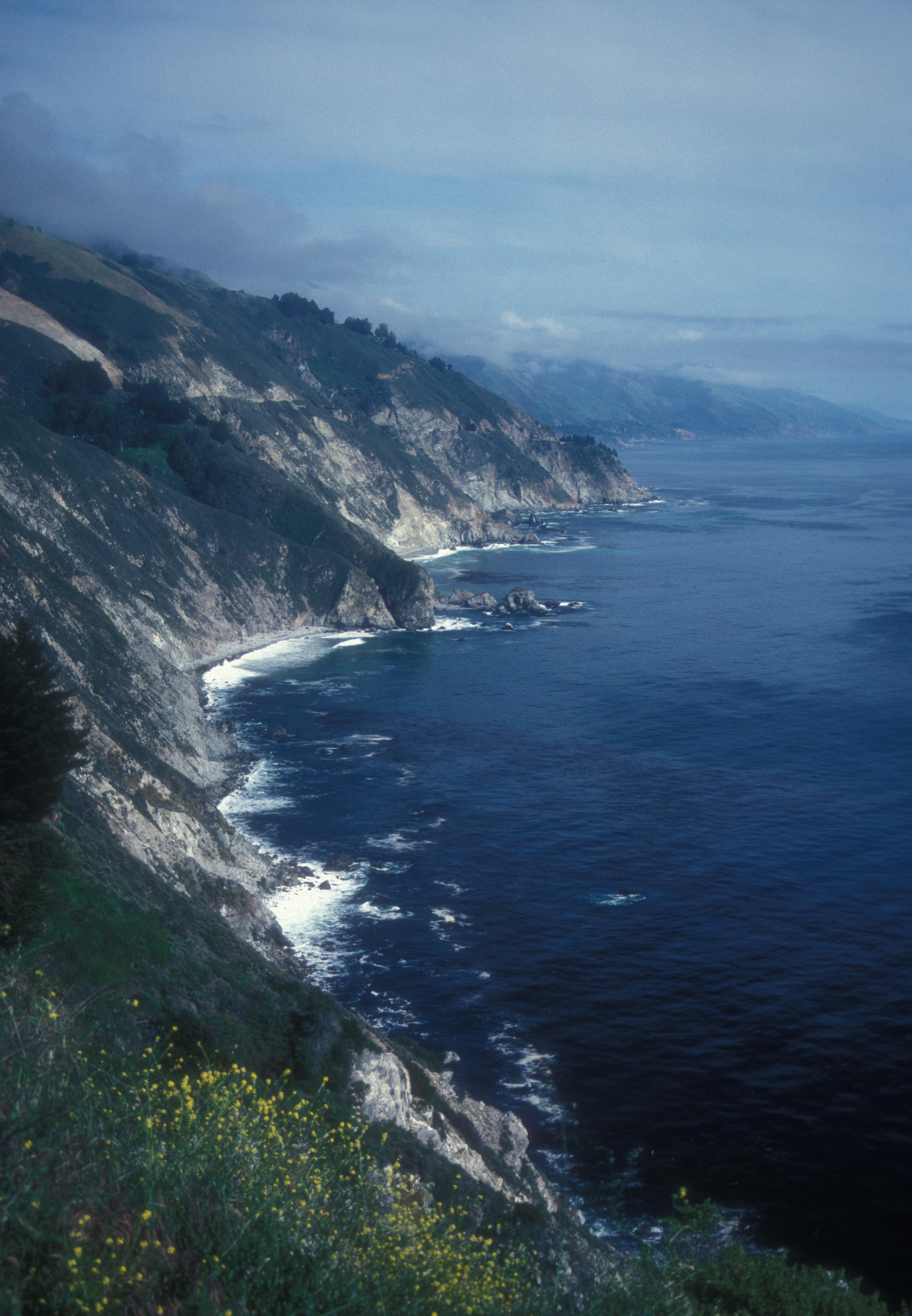
View of the coast and Santa Lucia Range from the Nepenthe restaurant terrace.

The restaurant became a favorite of Henry Miller. He later lived on Partington Ridge but returned often to the restaurant and became close friends with owner Bill Fassett. The restaurant became a social hub for artists, poets, actors and other creative individuals on the coast.

== Ownership ==
Lolly Fassett, who had lived in Europe as a teenager with her grandmother and artist Jane Gallatin Powers, hired architect Rowan Maiden to design a large terrace for dancing and dining, a big fire-pit, and built-in bleachers. The restaurant design was featured in architectural magazines. The opening on April 24, 1949 was attended by around 500 people. Lolly entertained guests in the small cabin's living room. As of 2017, the restaurant is owned and operated by the grandson of the founders, Kirk Gafill. His sister Erin Lee Gafill and her family live in the original log cabin.

In 1964, Lolly Fassett added the Phoenix Shop featuring gifts and local artist's wares, and in 1992, they opened the walk-up, casual Café Kevah. The owners donate 10 percent of the restaurant's net profit to community activities and organizations, including the Big Sur Health Center and the Big Sur Volunteer Fire Brigade.

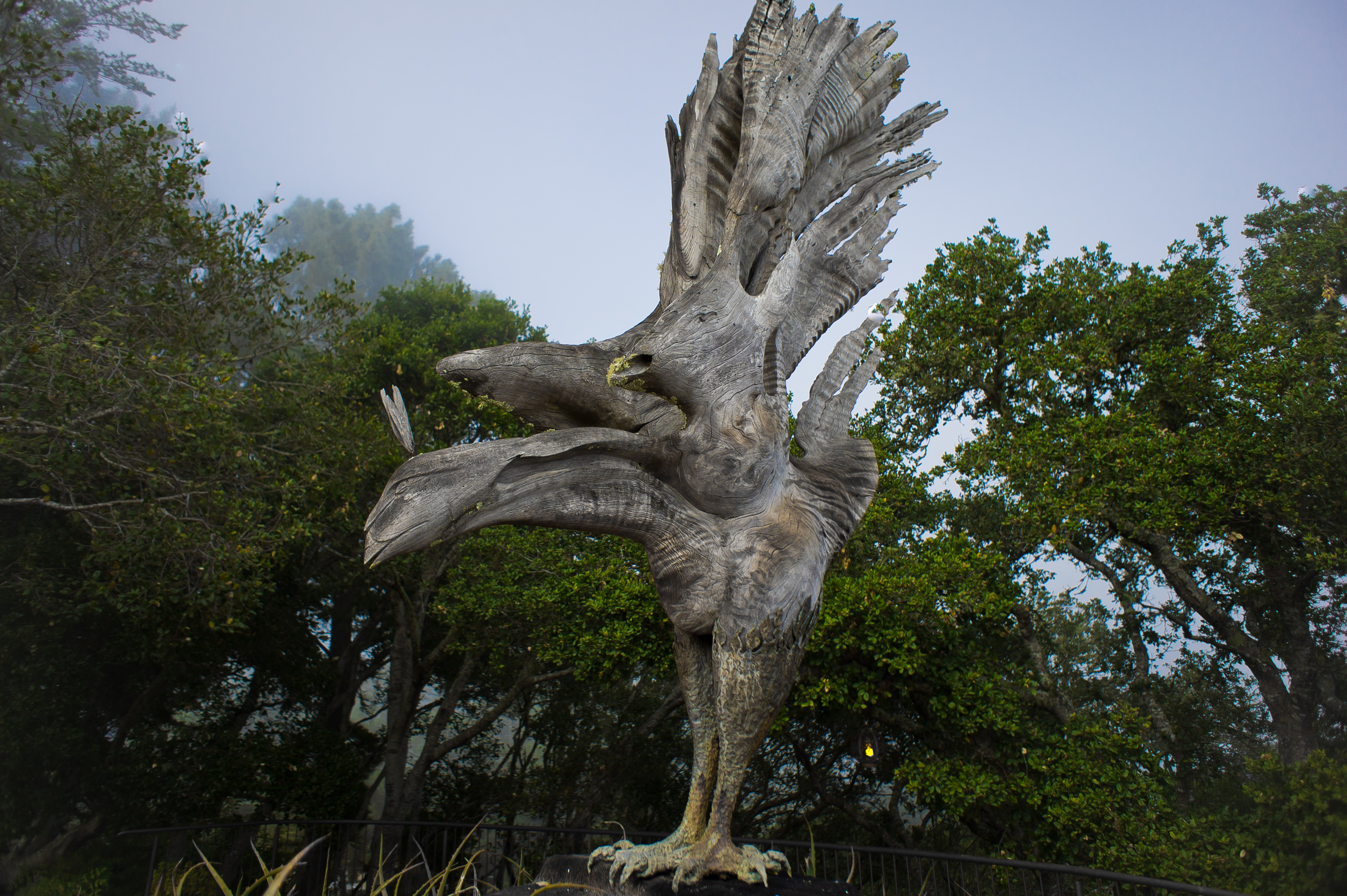
Edmund Kara's sculpture "Phoenix Bird" with wings extended on the terrace of the Nepenthe restaurant.

The terrace was formerly dominated by a large coastal live oak that died in the 1970s. After it died, sculptor Edmund Kara resurrected the trunk of the tree with a sculpture of the rising Phoenix, a standard symbol for Nepenthe. The bird is one piece with legs made of bronze.

== Closures ==
The Fassett family was forced to close the restaurant during fires in 1983 and again for three months in 1998. In 2008, the Basin Complex Fire closed Highway 1, costing the restaurant about $600,000 in revenue during peak season.

During the 2016–2017 winter, Pfeiffer Big Sur State Park received more than 60 inches of rain, and in early February 2017, several mudslides blocked the road in more than half a dozen locations. At Pfeiffer Canyon 1.7 miles (2.7 km) north of the restaurant, shifting earth damaged a pier supporting the bridge over the 320 feet (98 m) high canyon. CalTrans immediately closed the bridge and announced the next day that the bridge was damaged beyond repair and would have to be replaced.

During the same storm, a slide at a perennial problem point named Paul's Slide 22 miles (35 km) to the south, near Cone Peak, closed the road. For more than two weeks, the only way in and out of the area between the two closures was on foot or by helicopter. Farther south at Mud Creek, 35 miles (56 km) another slide blocked visitors from Southern California. The only remaining road out, Nacimiento-Fergusson Road, was a few days later temporarily closed due to slides. All of the businesses between the two closures, such as Nepenthe, Post Ranch Inn and Esalen Institute, and residents were isolated. Food and other essential items such as school supplies were ferried in by helicopter. The closure at Mud Creek was reopened to one-way traffic until May 22, 2017, when an extremely large slide covered Highway 1 for more than a quarter-mile. Trapped between the two breaks in the highway, Nepenthe and the other businesses were isolated with about 400 residents, about half of their regular customers.

The Pfeiffer Canyon Bridge re-opened on October 13, 2017 at a cost of $24 million. On August 2, 2017, CalTrans announced it would rebuild the highway over the slide at Mud Creek and planned to reopen the road in 2018 at a cost of $40 million.

The restaurant was forced to close again in August 2026 due to the Timber Fire.

== In popular culture ==
A dance scene from the 1965 film The Sandpiper starring Elizabeth Taylor and Richard Burton featured a set replicating the restaurant's terrace.

In the documentary television series Hollywood and the Stars' 1964 episode, "In Search of Kim Novak," Novak and others are shown dancing on the patio, near the firepit and checkerboard.
