= Edmund Kara =

American artist

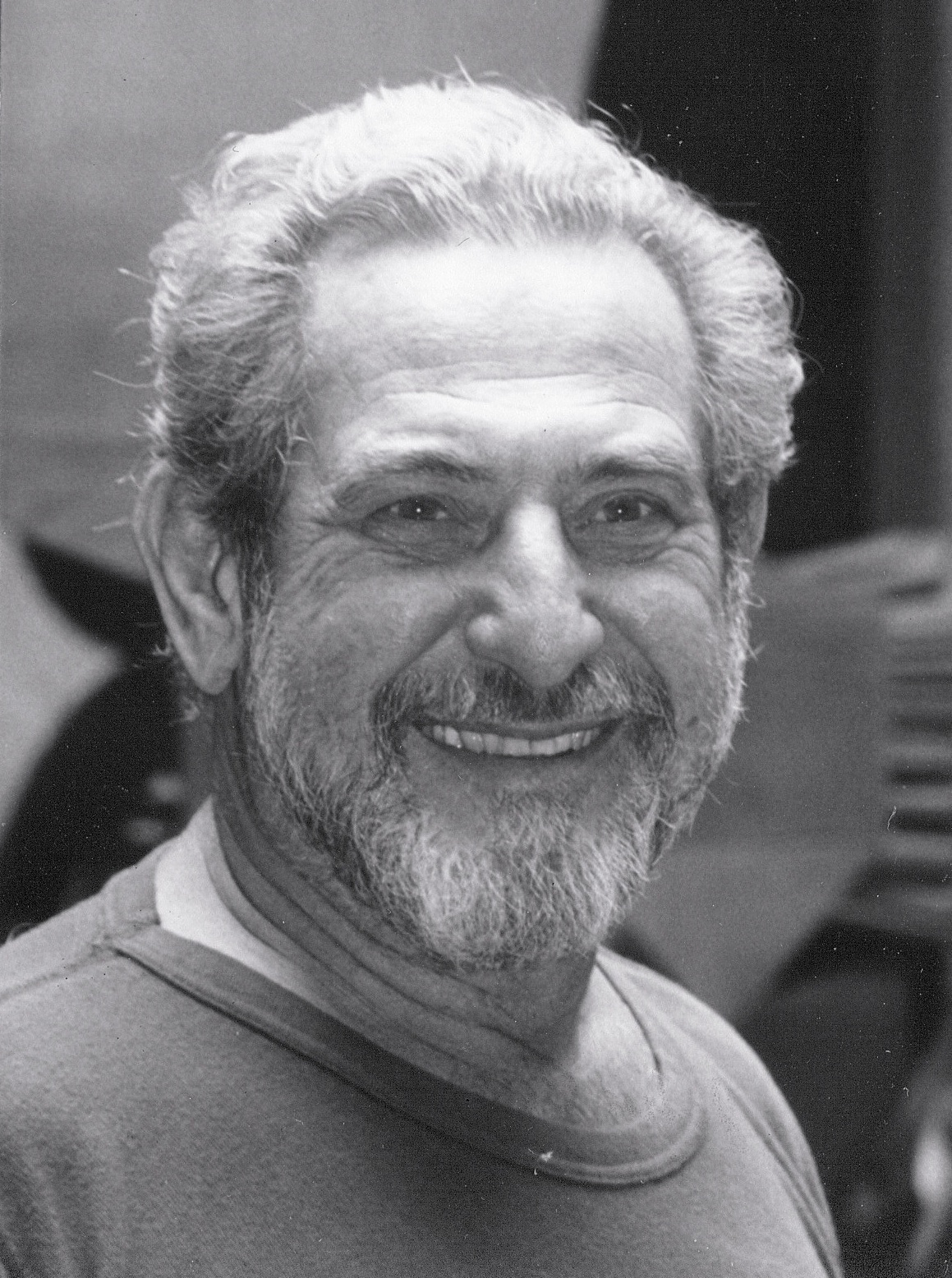
- Born: October 17, 1925; Roselle Park, New Jersey, United States
- Died: May 25, 2001 (aged 75); Monterey, California, United States
- Known for: Fashion Illustration and Design, Interior Design, Sculpture
- Website: www.edmundkara.com

Edmund Kara (17 October 1925 – 25 May 2001) was an American fashion illustrator and designer, interior designer, and sculptor on the Big Sur coast of California.

== Biography ==
=== Education and early career ===
Kara was born in Roselle Park, New Jersey and descended from Eastern European immigrants. His interest in art began at an early age. He attended New Jersey's Arts High School.

At the age of 18, Kara moved to New York City and started working in the display department of Macy's. He soon moved to fashion illustration for advertising agencies. He was introduced to Lena Horne, and was soon designing her performance wardrobe. Kara also designed for Peggy Lee, Sarah Churchill, Keely Smith, Miss Stella Brooks, and Mrs. Nat King Cole, Maria. Kara then designed for custom collections for Rosette Pennington and Jewel, among other custom houses in both New York and Los Angeles. He went on to create his own label.

Kara also worked in Los Angeles in the 1950's and doing theatrical wardrobe and costume design for both Universal and Paramount Studios. Moreover, he worked doing freelance interior design.

=== Later years and fine arts career ===
Finding the business aspects of the fashion industry repetitive, stressful, and stifling, Kara yearned for a change of lifestyle that led him to take a bicycle trip in 1953 around the world for two years. Though he returned to Los Angeles, but he would soon move to Big Sur in 1962 to find his passion of sculpture and establish a simpler existence.

It was in Big Sur that he became a wood sculptor creating a body of work ranging from masks and head figures to abstract pieces. His woodwork was fashioned from wood grown in Big Sur that was found or was given to him. He almost entirely used the reductive method. "I'm a worker. I belong to the working class. I love physical labor, that's why I chose wood," he told writer Rick Deragon in 1990.

Kara focused solely on creating art for almost 40 years in the isolated setting of his coastal studio. Images of Kara in his studio can be seen in Kurt Edward Fishback's book of photographs entitled Art in Residence: West Coast Artists in their Spaces. Kara said to David J. Brown, "I thought, capitalism annihilates creativity because you start working for bucks, rather than just working to be an artist."

== Showings, commission and public collections ==
Though Kara focused on producing his work, he did have several notable showings and his work appeared in locations around California. In 1965, his redwood sculpture of Elizabeth Taylor was commissioned for and appeared in Taylor's film The Sandpiper. This film brought him exposure in Hollywood and beyond. "Elizabeth came to see it to make sure I was not doing something outrageous. She approved," Kara told Curtis. A short promotional film called Statue for the Sandpiper (an original movie promotion) features Kara in action. He was flown to the unveiling in Paris where the actors and producers viewed and commented on the piece.

In 1990, Kara held a retrospective show of his collection in Los Angeles. It was one of the only times the entire collection was shown at one time. Kara also created several large door pieces as commissions for private collectors in Florida for a 12,000 square foot home and for another 18,000 square foot home in Walnut Creek. He later created doors for the Congregation Beth Israel Temple in Carmel Valley. He also created doors for Clint Eastwood and Maggie Johnson in Pebble Beach when they were married.

Kara's work can be seen in Big Sur at the Café Keva and at the famous restaurant, Nepenthe, where the 'Phoenix Bird' statue perches above the ocean and landmark for tourist and locals alike.

Below is a list of his significant works on display in the United States:

- 'Janus' – Vero Beach Museum of Art
- 'Five Avatars' – Self-Realization Fellowship
- 'Seven Point Flame' – Doors for Congregation Beth Israel, Carmel Valley
- 'Double Helix' – Monterey Peninsula College
- 'Phoenix Bird' – Nepenthe Restaurant
- 'Turtle Fountain' – Café Keva

Kara's artistry can be seen in his work ranging from religious, political, and socially significant pieces, to the mythical and esoteric. Kara's collection can still be seen online or by appointment.

== See also ==
Kurt Edward Fishback

== Sources ==
- Art in Residence: West Coast Artists in Their Space. (2000), ISBN 0-936085-59-2
- Brin M. David. "Outrageous Energy and Very Good Discipline." Edmund Kara biography, 2008. http://www.edmundkara.com/biography
- Brown, David J. Person interview. 1996, published Monterey Herald.
- Curtis, Jahn. Personal interview. 1986
- Deragon, Rick. Artist Biography for Edmund Kara Exhibition. 1990
