= Fischbacher =

Fischbacher may refer to:

- Andrea Fischbacher (born 1985), Austrian alpine skier
- Andreas Fischbacher (born 1973), Austrian ski mountaineer
- Axel Fischbacher (born 1956), German jazz musician
- Christian Fischbacher (1913–2006), Swiss skeleton racer
- Emil Fischbacher, Chinese: 巴 醫生 (1903–1933), Scottish Protestant Christian missionary to Xinjiang
- Jakob Fischbacher (1886–1972), German politician
- Martin Siegfried Fischbacher (1939–2021) of "Siegfried & Roy"

== See also ==
- Fischbach (disambiguation)
- Fischbach (surname)
