= Redwood statue of Elizabeth Taylor =

1964 sculpture

- Artist: Edmund Kara
- Year: 1964
- Medium: Redwood
- Subject: Elizabeth Taylor
- Weight: 712 lbs

A statue of Elizabeth Taylor was sculpted from redwood by the artist Edmund Kara for the 1964 film The Sandpiper. The film starred Taylor and Richard Burton who had recently become her fifth husband. The piece was sculpted from a 2,200 lbs trunk of redwood; the finished piece weighed 712 lbs. The piece is depicted in the film as having been sculpted by Charles Bronson's character, Cos Erickson, who is love with Taylor's character, Laura Reynolds. Bronson's role was originally intended for Sammy Davis Jr., but the implications of an interracial relationship between Taylor and Davis's character saw Davis's casting quashed by Martin Ransohoff, the producer of The Sandpiper.

A short promotional film called A Statue for the Sandpiper was made in 1965 that depicts Kara at work on the piece.

The film was set in the Big Sur region of California; the area had long been Kara's home. Kara was photographed at work on the sculpture by Walter Chappell. Taylor herself never posed or sat for Kara, but a plaster life-cast of her face was provided for him to work from. Kara's friend, the jazz singer Stella Brooks, posed as Taylor's body double for Kara's sculpture. Upon its completion the sculpture was shipped aboard the RMS Queen Mary to Paris, France, for the film's premier. Production of the film had moved to Paris to preserve Burton and Taylor's status as tax exiles. The producer of the film, Martin Ransohoff, had booked a first class stateroom for the sculpture's passage, with an accompanying security guard. The prohibitive weight of the sculpture eventually necessitated its shipping in the hold of the ship. The sculpture was subsequently publicly unveiled in a Parisian art gallery by Burton.
