= Norte Fire =

2026 wildfire in Orange County, California

- Norte Fire in San Juan Capistrano
- Date: October 16, 2026 – October 23, 2026
- Location: San Clemente and San Juan Capistrano, Orange County, California, United States

Impacts
- Deaths: None
- Injuries: 2 firefighters

Ignition
- Cause: Under investigation

The Norte Fire was a wildfire in southern Orange County, California that began about 11:30 a.m. on October 16, 2026, near Portico Del Norte and Eminencia Del Norte on the northern edge of San Clemente. The fire was driven by Santa Ana winds through brush, and the fire had burned 250 acres within an hour, then crossed into San Juan Capistrano. The fire had burned 570 acres (230 ha) by that evening. At least seven homes in San Juan Capistrano were damaged or destroyed, and two firefighters were hospitalized with heat-related injuries. The Orange County Fire Authority reported the fire 5 percent contained on the morning of October 17. The fire was fully contained on October 23, and the cause is currently under investigation however early lawsuits allege the blaze was sparked by San Diego Gas & Electric.

Evacuation orders were issued for 6,000 homes and 16,000 residents in San Clemente; shelters were opened at community centers in both cities. The Capistrano Unified School District dismissed students early at ten schools, and the state received a Fire Management Assistance Grant from the Federal Emergency Management Agency. On October 17 the Orange County Sheriff's Department lifted the order for San Clemente Zone 13 and part of San Juan Capistrano Zone 10; orders remained in effect for the rest of the evacuated area.

== See also ==
- 2026 California wildfires
- Santa Ana winds
- Orange County Fire Authority
