= Fischbach =

Fischbach may refer to:

== People ==
- Fischbach (surname)

== Places ==
=== Austria ===
- Fischbach, Styria, in the Weiz district
- Fischbach (Texingtal), part of the municipality Texingtal, Lower Austria

=== Germany ===
==== Rhineland-Palatinate ====
- Fischbach bei Dahn, part of the Verbandsgemeinde Dahner Felsenland, in the Südwestpfalz district
- Fischbach, Birkenfeld, part of the Verbandsgemeinde Herrstein, in the Birkenfeld district
- Fischbach, Kaiserslautern, part of the Verbandsgemeinde Hochspeyer, in the Kaiserslautern district
- Fischbach-Oberraden, part of the Verbandsgemeinde Neuerburg, in the Bitburg-Prüm district

==== Hesse ====
- Fischbach (Taunus), in the Main-Taunus district,
- Fischbach, a part of Alsfeld, in the Vogelsbergkreis district
- Fischbach, a part of Hauneck, in the Hersfeld-Rotenburg district

==== Thuringia ====
- Fischbach/Rhön, in Wartburgkreis
- Fischbach bei Gotha
- Fischbach bei Bad Salzungen

==== Baden-Württemberg ====
- Fischbach, a part of Schluchsee, in the Breisgau-Hochschwarzwald district
- Fischbach, a part of Ummendorf, in the Biberach district

==== Saarland ====
- Fischbach, a part of Quierschied, in Regionalverband Saarbrücken

==== Bavaria ====
- Fischbach, a part of Nuremberg

=== Luxembourg ===
- Fischbach, Mersch, a commune in Mersch canton
- Fischbach, Clervaux, a village in the commune of Heinerscheid, in Clervaux canton

=== Switzerland ===
- Fischbach, Lucerne, in the Canton of Lucerne
- Fischbach-Göslikon, in the Canton of Aargau
- Fischbach, an old commune before amalgamating into Fischbach-Göslikon in 1798

== Rivers ==
=== Germany ===
==== Baden-Württemberg ====
- Fischbach (Eschach)
- Fischbach (Seckach)

==== Bavaria ====
- Fischbach (Linder), tributary of the Linder
- Fischbach (Pegnitz), tributary of the Goldbach which discharges into the Pegnitz
- Fischbach (Weiße Traun), tributary of the Weiße Traun

==== Hesse ====
- Fischbach (Gersprenz)

==== North Rhine-Westphalia ====
- Fischbach (Asdorf)
