= Feshbach =

Feshbach is a name of German origin. It may refer to:

== People ==
- Herman Feshbach (1917–2000), American physicist
- Jessica Feshbach (born 1975), American Scientologist
- Murray Feshbach (1929–2019), American demographer

== Science ==
- Herman Feshbach Prize in Theoretical Nuclear Physics, named for the physicist
- Feshbach resonance, a resonance between slow atoms

== See also ==
- Fischbach (surname)
