= Dome Fire (disambiguation) =

The Dome Fire was a wildfire that burned in New Mexico in 1996. Dome Fire may also refer to:

- Dome Fire (2020), a 2020 wildfire in Mojave National Preserve
- Dome Fire (2026), an active wildfire in Yosemite National Park
