= Santa Rosa Island Fire =

Wildfire in California in 2026

- Part of the 2026 California wildfires
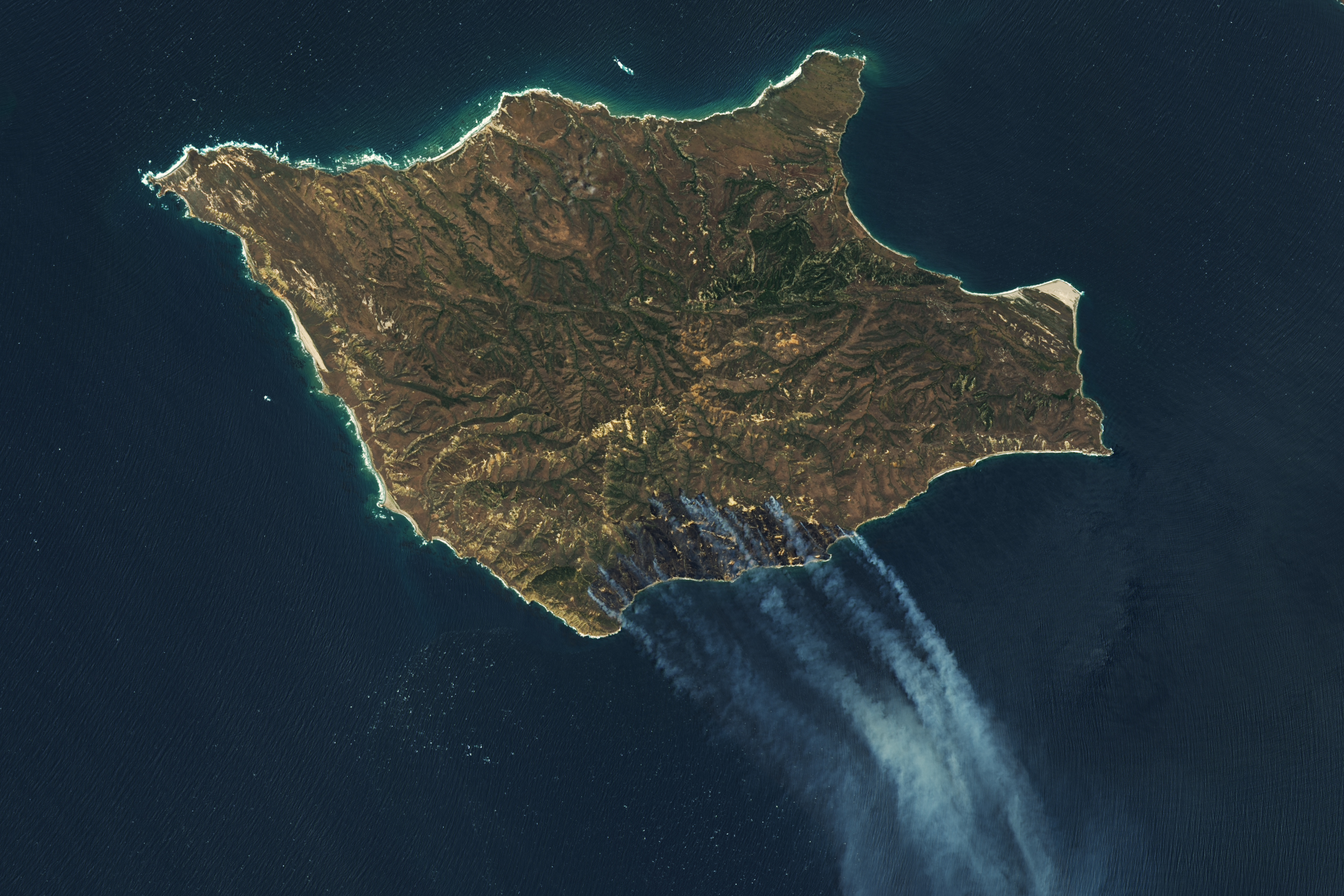
- Landsat 9 imagery of the Santa Rosa Island Fire burning in Channel Islands National Park on May 16, 2026
- Date: May 15, 2026 – June 4, 2026
- Location: Santa Barbara County, California
- Coordinates: 33.58°N 120.06°W

Statistics
- Status: Extinguished
- Perimeter: 100% contained
- Burned area: 18,379 acres (7,438 ha)

Impacts
- Deaths: 0
- Injuries: 0
- Structures destroyed: 2
- Cost: $1.8 million USD

Ignition
- Cause: Human

Map
- Perimeter map of Santa Rosa Island Fire (map data)

The Santa Rosa Island Fire was a wildfire that burned about one-third of Santa Rosa Island, one of the Channel Islands off the coast of Southern California. The fire ignited on May 15 and was fully contained on June 4, 2026, after burning 18,379 acres (7,438 ha). It is the largest wildfire of the 2026 California wildfire season, as well as the largest wildfire ever recorded on the Channel islands.

== Fire origin ==
The fire ignited at approximately 4:19 pm on May 15. The spark was ignited after a 67-year-old sailor crashed his boat on the island's rocks and fired a flare gun to call for help. The Coast Guard, which evacuated the sailor by helicopter, initially stated on Instagram that the cause of the fire was his flare gun usage, but had since revised it to state the cause was "under investigation." The sailor told a local salvage company that his boat caught fire after an accidental grounding on the island and that he had only launched flares hours after the fire had started. A video received by SFGate showed a man filming a grounded burning sailboat on May 14, one day before the wildfire started, saying, "I hope I don't start this island on fire."

With high winds and dry vegetation directly in the fire's vicinity, the wind-whipped flames burned over 1,000 acres (400 ha) within the first day, continuing to grow overnight.

== Progression ==
Staff on the island were already attempting to halt the spread of the fire after hearing about it but crews from the United States Forest Service, Los Padres National Forest, were also being sent by boat to the island in an effort to make access.

The next day, the fire continued to grow as mapping efforts had the fire at 5,690 acres (2,300 ha), containment remaining at zero percent. The first batch of crews arrived on scene and were aggressively fighting the flames, with the total amount of firefighters at around two dozen, including rangers. Containment was difficult with the rugged terrain.

By the 17th, the fire made runs to the east reaching San Augustine canyon with the western flank burning ferociously to the southern tip of the island, making it to the area of South Point Lighthouse. Structures along with animal and plant species were reportedly threatened with two historic structures already destroyed in the blaze. Acreage then stood at 10,029 acres (4,059 ha) with personnel at 50.

Timelapse from satellite imagery of this fire and the Sandy fire burning in southern California on May 19

Fire activity moderated that night and was limited to the eastern corner, but on May 18 during the afternoon hours, the fire flared up and continued to grow to the north on its east flank spreading further into the national park. Air operations such as retardant drops and other forms of aerial firefighting were hindered due to the high winds. The fire had gained another 4,000 acres (1,600 ha) according to mapping flights. The next day on the 19th, the fire still grew further to the north having gained another 2,500 acres (1,000 ha) but crews made better progress in containment, as it was now up to 26% by the end of the day. The fire remained active overnight.

On the 20th, the fire surpassed 17,000 acres (6,900 ha) as the east flank continued pushing up the island to the north consuming unburned vegetation near black rock and transitioning up slope all the way to east point road and beyond continuing to be active in the overnight hours, however this activity was less intense than what was observed in previous days. Active fire was reported to also be observed near Soledad Peak where structure protection was in place. Crews were however successful in constructing containment lines near these areas and the total containment rose to 44% by the evening hours as over 130 personnel were now fighting the fire.

May 21st, 22nd, 23rd saw more leaps in containment as the fire stopped growing at 18,379 acres (7,438 ha) and better weather conditions arrived. At this point, the fire perimeter was still active on the inside and was in a mop up phase in containment. This is basically where firefighters find and put out hot spots that may reignite and threaten containment lines that were established. As this phase was happening, the number of personnel staffing the fire remained at around 130. Containment was all the way up to 87 percent by the 24th with minimal fire behavior.

The fire was 97% contained through the remainder of the end of May, no further growth was expected of the fire.

The fire was 100% contained by June 4th, 2026.

== Impacts ==
The fire caused smoke and air quality concerns for areas near the coast of Los Angeles due to Pacific winds blowing the smoke that way. The national park was closed over the fire's lifetime and beyond until June 6th with many staff and other people evacuated from the island by helicopter during the fire's peak. After a damage assessment, the Torrey pine trees within the national park were reported to be "still intact" after the fire came through, likely due to the fire's moderation in intensity when it came through, only burning the understory below the trees.

A recovery assessment is currently ongoing on the island by a burned area response team of scientists to assess the damage done and recovery efforts needed to bring the island back to its original state. The fire had burned through a critical area for wildlife and ecosystems, raising concerns about displacement and loss of food sources for these animals. The forest closures were extended during this assessment.

== Growth and Containment Table ==
Fire containment status Gray: contained; Red: active; %: percent contained;
Date	Area Burned	Containment	Personnel	Citations
May 15	1,000		48	
May 16	5,690		51	
May 17	10,029		58	
May 18	14,600		74	
May 19	16,942		135	
May 20	17,554		139	
May 21	18,379		139	
May 22	18,379		136	
May 23	18,379		138	
May 24	18,379		117	
May 25-27	18,379		64	
May 28- June 3	18,379		58	
June 4	18,379		0	

The island itself is 53,195 acres
