= The Sandpiper =

1965 film

- Theatrical release poster by Howard Terpning
- Directed by: Vincente Minnelli
- Screenplay by: Michael Wilson; Dalton Trumbo; Irene Kemp (adaptation); Louis Kemp (adaptation)
- Story by: Martin Ransohoff
- Produced by: Martin Ransohoff
- Starring: Elizabeth Taylor; Richard Burton; Eva Marie Saint; Charles Bronson
- Cinematography: Milton R. Krasner
- Edited by: David Bretherton
- Music by: Johnny Mandel
- Production company: Filmways
- Distributed by: Metro-Goldwyn-Mayer
- Release date: June 23, 1965 (US)
- Running time: 117 minutes
- Country: United States
- Language: English
- Budget: $5 million
- Box office: $13.6 million

The Sandpiper is a 1965 American drama film directed by Vincente Minnelli and starring Elizabeth Taylor and Richard Burton, the third of eleven films starring the power couple. The film explores the relationship between a repressed religious-school headmaster and a free-spirited California artist in the years bridging the beatnik and hippie movements of the 60's.

== Plot ==
Laura Reynolds (Taylor) is a free-spirited, unwed, single mother living with her preteen son Danny in an isolated beach house in Big Sur, California. She makes a modest living as an artist and homeschools her son out of concern that he will be compelled to follow stifling conventional social norms in a public school. Recently, Danny has gotten into legal trouble three times, one of indecently touching a girl his age, and shooting a fawn to understand if hunting is "fun". In his mother's eyes, these things are innocent expressions of his natural curiosity and conscience rather than delinquency.

The local judge orders Danny to an Episcopal boarding school in lieu of reform school, a decision equally odious to Laura. Dr. Edward Hewitt (Burton) is headmaster and his wife Claire (Saint) teaches. Edward and Claire are happily married with two student sons boarding away from home at a college-preparatory school, but their life has become routine and their youthful idealism has been tamed via social and golf clubs, and the constant need to raise funds for the school and please wealthy benefactors.

At an initial interview, there is a fleeting attraction between Laura and Edward, but this quickly dissipates, due to their greatly differing world views and Laura's disdain of religion and bourgeois conformity. Finally she storms out. She attempts to flee the area with Danny, but the police catch them and bring the boy to school.

He has trouble fitting in; his mother's homeschooling has placed him far in advance of boys his age. He can recite the Canterbury Tales in Middle English, verbatim. The standard courses of instruction at the school leave him restless and bored. At Claire's suggestion, Edward visits Danny's mother to learn more about his unique upbringing.

Laura's unconventional morals disturb Edward because they conflict with his religious and social beliefs. After visiting her several more times, he begins to fall in love. They begin a passionate affair. Laura tells herself that Edward is a fling like her other lovers, but to her surprise she finds herself falling in love with him, becoming jealous of his wife Claire. He struggles with guilt, while she urges him to accept their love. Meanwhile, Danny flourishes after Edward relaxes school rules and allows the boy to choose more advanced classes.

Ward Hendricks, a wealthy businessman and jealous ex-lover of Laura's, who paid for two years of her art studies, exposes the affair at a dinner party. At first Claire is distraught, but later they reflect upon how their lives and ideals have diverged from their youth. Edward declares that he still loves Claire and that he will end the affair. Still, they agree to a temporary separation.

Edward tells Laura that he confessed to Claire, she is outraged by the invasion of her personal privacy, and they part angrily. The school year over, Laura tells Danny that they can move away, but he has put down roots at the school and wants to stay. Laura is ambivalent, but realizes Danny's need to be independent and agrees. Danny asks Laura to come to a church event to hear him and the choir sing. She is uncomfortable being at the church or near Edward and Claire. During the service, Edward resigns his position at the school and the church. In his resignation speech, he mentions some of the things he'll miss and although they sound generic, they are specific things he and Laura shared. Tears fill her eyes. After the service, Edward sees Laura and tells her he will be leaving the area and traveling down the coast. As a parting gift, Edward has arranged for Danny to attend school tuition-free. All Laura can do is look at Edward with tears in her eyes.

On Edward's way out of town, he stops above Laura's beach house for a silent farewell. She and Danny are on the beach. Edward up on the bluff looks down at them. Laura turns from her painting, looks up and smiles, then he turns and walks away.

== Cast ==
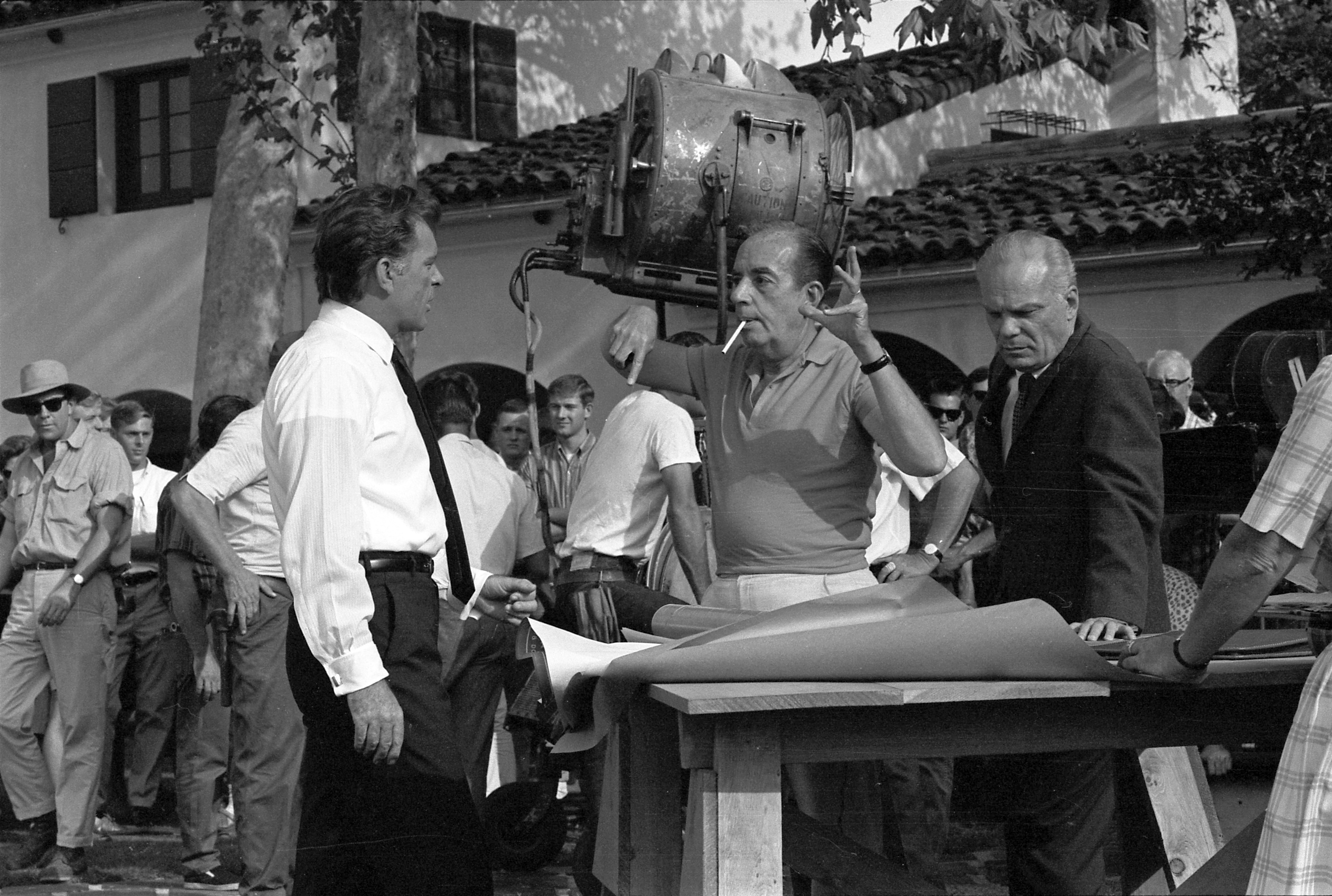
Burton (left) in conversation with Minnelli (with cigarette) during filming in San Dimas, California, 4 October 1964

- Elizabeth Taylor as Laura Reynolds
- Richard Burton as Dr. Edward Hewitt
- Eva Marie Saint as Claire Hewitt
- Charles Bronson as Cos Erickson
- Robert Webber as Ward Hendricks
- James Edwards as Larry Brant
- Torin Thatcher as Judge Thompson
- Tom Drake as Walter Robinson
- Douglas Henderson as Paul Sutcliff
- Morgan Mason as Danny Reynolds

== Production ==
According to the 29 May 1963 The New York Times and 5 Jun 1963 Daily Variety, Taylor was to receive $1 million against ten percent of gross profits. 23 July 1963, 14 February 1964 and 23 March 1964 Daily Variety rumors alleged that Taylor may leave the project to be replaced by Kim Novak. Principal photography began 7 September 1964. On 7 December 1964, Daily Variety announced the completion of principal photography with a $7.5 million budget. Burton's wardrobe budget increased by $10,000 to hire Sy Devore.

=== Title ===
The character, Laura Reynolds, splints a sandpiper with a broken wing, as Edward Hewitt looks on. The bird lives in her home until it is healed and then flies free, though it comes back occasionally. This sandpiper is used as a central motif in the movie, illustrating the themes of growth and freedom.

=== Location ===
The Sandpiper is one of the very few major studio pictures ever filmed in Big Sur, and the story is specifically set there. The film includes many location shots of Big Sur landmarks, including Pfeiffer Beach, Point Lobos State Reserve, Bixby Creek Bridge, the Coast Gallery (where Laura exhibits her artwork), and the restaurant Nepenthe. The Episcopal boarding school exteriors were filmed in San Dimas, California and scenes were filmed in West Covina, California, and at California State Polytechnic University, Pomona. To preserve Burton and Taylor's status as tax exiles, interiors were filmed on stages at both the Studios de Saint-Maurice and Studios de Billancourt, including a replica of the Nepenthe restaurant.

=== Theme ===
The theme music for the film was "The Shadow of Your Smile", by Johnny Mandel, with lyrics by Paul Francis Webster. It was sung by an uncredited choral group, and the tune was used throughout the film, featuring the trumpet of Jack Sheldon. It won the 1965 Academy Award for Best Original Song, and a recording by Tony Bennett won the 1966 Grammy Award for Song of the Year.

=== Nudity ===
Taylor was filmed topless in one scene but it was cut prior to the film's release. Laura Reynolds poses topless for Cos Erickson's six-foot redwood sculpture, Redwood statue of Elizabeth Taylor by Edmund Kara.

=== Home media ===
The DVD, released in 2006, includes two short films the filmmakers shot along with the movie, one about Big Sur and its artist colony, featuring narration by Burton, and another about the bust of Elizabeth Taylor that was commissioned from a Big Sur artist for use as a prop in the movie.

=== Paperback novelization ===
Pocket Books published a novelization of the screenplay by Robert Hemenway, who would continue to write fiction and would later become a renowned American educator and biographer. The Sandpiper was his sole media tie-in book.

== Reception ==
The film received mostly negative reviews from critics, though the musical score and location photography drew praise. LIFE magazine was dismissive and disappointed: “[the generous salary package for the couple] was clearly enough to get both the Burtons to act in what is possibly one of the most tedious, inane and ludicrous films ever made. In fact the intention of everyone connected with this $5.3 million sleeping pill can only have been to make money. If any one of them had any intention of making even a passably fair film it would have showed up somewhere in a line of dialogue, a bit of direction, a moment of honesty during the picture’s interminable two hours….Any publisher could comb through [the] script and come out with a best-selling dictionary of cliches. As for the humor—in a drama of doomed lovers?—Are you kidding? There were, nevertheless, countless whoops of hilarity from the audience I was with. They broke up, for instance, when Burton, prone upon the sand beside his mistress, announced, ‘I have lost my sense of sin!’ What Burton has really lost is his sense of the appropriate. He could have chosen any number of cushy roles which would have fulfilled his talents or even challenged them. There is, after all, nothing wrong with making money. The people involved in ‘The Sandpiper’ manufactured a motion picture—they didn’t rob a bank. So what’s the crime? The crime is that a truly great actor has danced to the tune of petty pipers.”

The Boston Globe wrote in its review, "If anyone had suggested to me that Elizabeth Taylor and Richard Burton could be beaten out by the background scenery of a co-starring film, I would never have believed it. But that is what has happened." Time wrote in its review, "The Sandpiper's absurd situations are matched by dialogue that her beauty and his talent cannot vanquish." Variety wrote in its review, "is trite and often ponderous in its philosophizing by the two principals, and picture is further burdened by lack of any fresh approach," but praised the theme song as "The Best Song" in a movie that year. Time Out called the film, " a truly dire romantic melodrama. The film is quite simply so much soap. Only the shots of the Californian coastline are at all classy." Stanley Eichenbaum wrote in San Francisco Examiner, "Milton Krasner's exciting color photography does full justice to the stupendous contours of Big Sur," but added, "Dispite a candidly outspoken, sensually charged atmosphere, the film offers nothing inspiring or original." Louis Cook's review in The Detroit Free Press stated, "The opening of the film is a treasure, a dwelling on the Big Sur coast line south of Monterey. It is one of the lovliest recordings of a seascape ever made. It would be elegant if The Sandpiper had ended after ten minutes. Aside from this diversion, The Sandpiper gets itself into long, talky philosophical discussions of the type of the type popular at Hollywood cocktail parties. The picture telegraphs its devices."

On Rotten Tomatoes, the film holds a rating of 21% based on 28 reviews.

By 1976 Variety estimated the film had earned $7 million in theatrical rentals in North America.

=== Awards and nominations ===
| Award | Category | Nominee(s) | Result | Ref. |
|---|---|---|---|---|
| Academy Awards | Best Original Song | "The Shadow of Your Smile"; Music by Johnny Mandel; Lyrics by Paul Francis Webster | Won | |
| Golden Globe Awards | Best Original Score | Johnny Mandel | Nominated | |
| Golden Globe Awards | Best Original Song | "The Shadow of Your Smile"; Music by Johnny Mandel; Lyrics by Paul Francis Webster | Nominated | |
| Grammy Awards | Best Original Score Written for a Motion Picture or Television Show | Johnny Mandel | Won | |
| Laurel Awards | Female Star | Elizabeth Taylor | Won | |

The film is recognized by American Film Institute in these lists:

- 2004: AFI's 100 Years...100 Songs:
  - "The Shadow of Your Smile" – #77
- 2005: AFI's 100 Years of Film Scores – Nominated

== See also ==
- List of American films of 1965
