= Sandy Fire =

2026 California wildfire

- Part of the 2026 California wildfires
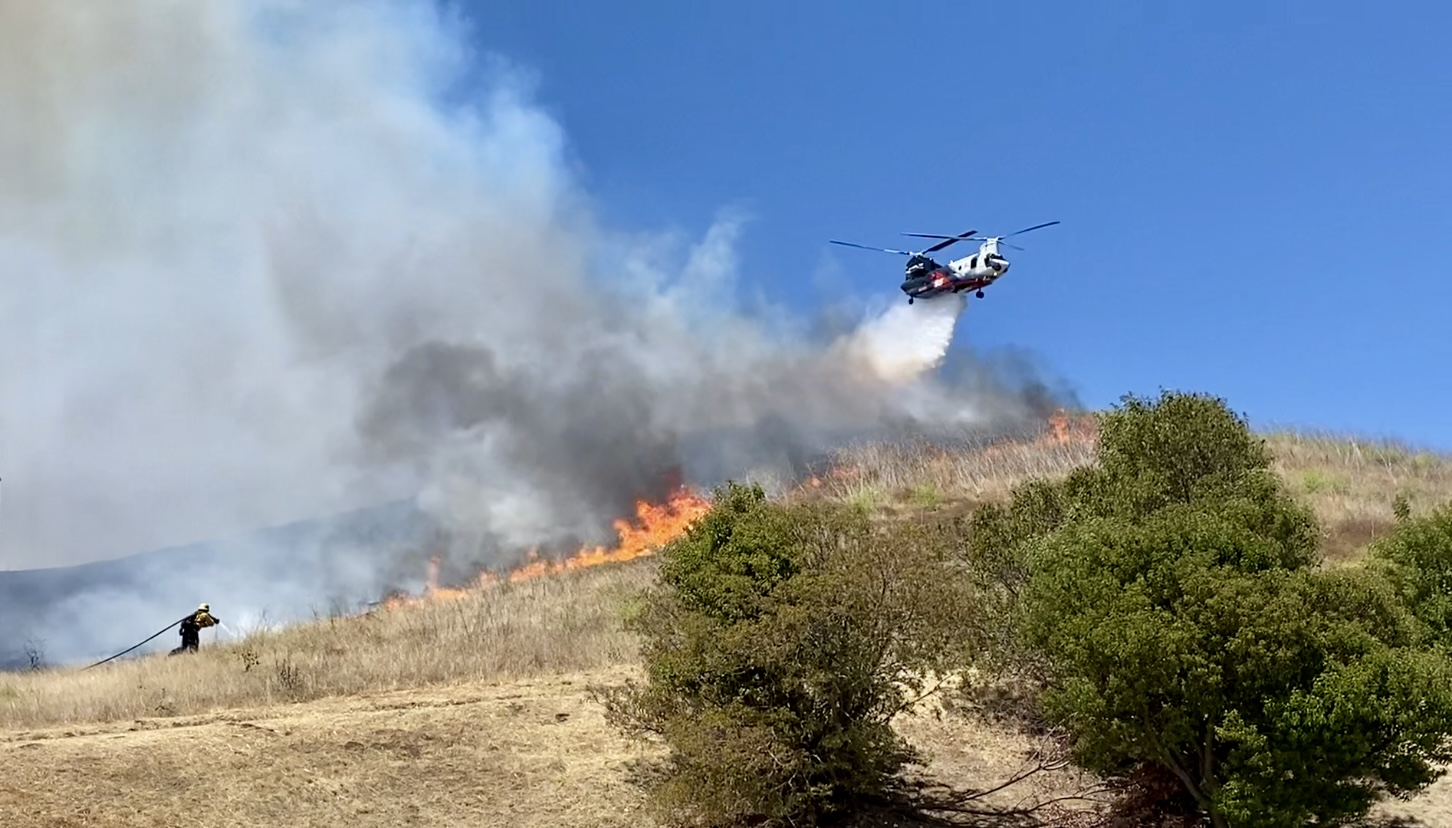
- A Ventura County firefighter and helicopter fighting the Sandy Fire on May 18, 2026
- Date: May 18 – 27, 2026
- Location: Simi Valley, California, U.S.
- Coordinates: 34.249653°N 118.744109°W

Statistics
- Status: Extinguished
- Perimeter: 100% contained
- Burned area: 2,183 acres (883 ha)

Impacts
- Deaths: 0
- Evacuated: ≥33,000
- Structures destroyed: 1

Ignition
- Cause: Under investigation

Map
- Location of Sandy Fire in California

The Sandy Fire was a large wildfire south of Simi Valley in Ventura County, California. The fire ignited on May 18, 2026, and was contained on May 27 after burning 2,183 acres (883 ha).

== Cause ==
The cause is under investigation with reports of the fire being sparked by a tractor hitting a rock.

== Progression ==
Driven by springtime Santa Ana Winds, the fire broke out at 10:50 a.m. on May 18, 2026, south of Simi Valley, California. By 11:03 a.m., the fire covered 10 acres and was spreading rapidly. A Cal Fire status report at 11:17 a.m. said the fire had spread to 184 acres (74 ha), had spotted over a road, and was continuing to spread to the southeast.

Later on in the day, around 1:44 p.m., the fire moved towards the Westlake area, wind driven and posing a threat to life and property. Evacuation orders were expanded as the fire continued to spot and grew to 720 acres (290 ha).

A wind shift then drove the fire southeast with additional evacuations being ordered for Bell and surrounding canyons. The fire had surpassed 1,000 acres (400 ha) with containment remaining at 0%. Fire activity diminished overnight due to increased humidity and lighter winds with over 750 personnel assigned to the blaze.

The next day during the afternoon hours, the fire flared up again and was running to the south once more, spotting across Albertson motorway and burning into inaccessible terrain with the wind, but only for a short time as fire activity decreased again later in the afternoon only to increase again this time pushing up against houses off of Sequoia Avenue for the rest of the day, staying on that side of the avenue allowing heavy equipment and firefighters to work on containment during the overnight hours, which was increased to 15%. One structure was also destroyed and was shown on news stations.

At over 2,000 acres (810 ha), the fire flared up again on the 20th, however, it was mostly contained. Over 1,000 personnel were working the fire and containment increased steadily in the coming days, reaching 71% on the morning of May 24, and 75% by that evening.

== Effects ==
The Sandy Fire prompted evacuation orders and warnings (Note: An evacuation warning means there is impending danger to life or property and an evacuation order means immediate threat.) across Los Angeles and Ventura counties. An evacuation center opened at Rancho Santa Susana Community Park and a large animal shelter at Ventura County Fairgrounds. The fire destroyed one home. Schools in Simi Valley Unified School District were closed for the week of May 18. The fire prompted an air quality alert in nearby areas.

== Growth and containment table ==
Date	Acres (hectares) Burned	Personnel	Containment	Citation
May 18	1,368 acres (554 ha)	Unknown		
May 19	1,698 acres (687 ha)	869		
May 20	2,115 acres (856 ha)	859		
May 21	2,141 acres (866 ha)	1,121		
May 22	2,183 acres (883 ha)	1,156		
May 23	2,183 acres (883 ha)	431		
May 24	2,183 acres (883 ha)	147		
May 25	2,183 acres (883 ha)	147		
May 26	2,183 acres (883 ha)	147		
May 27	2,183 acres (883 ha)	147		
