= 2026 California wildfires =

Series of wildfires

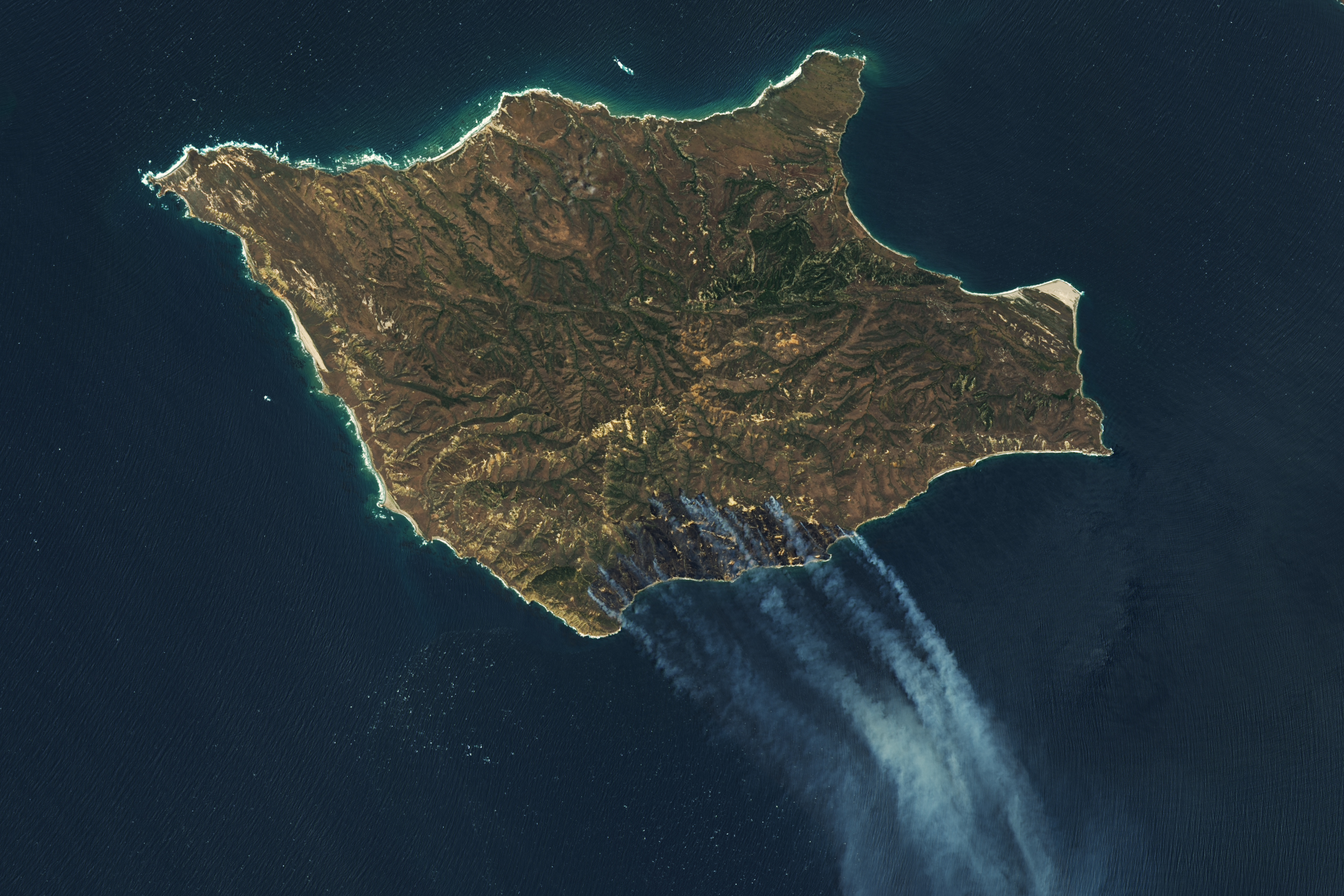
- Landsat 9 imagery of the Santa Rosa Island Fire burning in Channel Islands National Park on May 16, 2026

Statistics
- Total fires: 5,701
- Total area: 328,950 acres (133,121 ha)

Impacts
- Deaths: 1
- Structures destroyed: 157

The 2026 California wildfires are a series of active wildfires currently ongoing in California.

== Background ==
The timing of "fire season" in California is variable, depending on the amount of prior winter and spring precipitation, the frequency and severity of weather such as heat waves and wind events, and moisture content in vegetation. Northern California typically sees wildfire activity between late spring and early fall, peaking in the summer with hotter and drier conditions. Occasional cold frontal passages can bring wind and lightning. The timing of fire season in Southern California is similar, peaking between late spring and autumn. The severity and duration of peak activity in either part of the state is modulated in part by weather events: downslope/offshore wind events can lead to critical fire weather, while onshore flow and Pacific weather systems can bring conditions that hamper wildfire growth.

In 2026, the state and surrounding areas were experiencing extreme heat and its mountains had minimal snow pack during the winter into spring, raising concerns for an active fire season, as the snowpack was only 18% of average.

== List of wildfires ==
The following is a list of fires that burned more than 1,000 acres (400 ha), produced significant structural damage, or resulted in casualties.

Name	County	Acres	Start date	Containment date	Notes	Image	Ref.
Paramount	Kern, Kings	1,280	March 25	March 25			
Springs	Riverside	4,176	April 3	April 8	Caused evacuations for the city of Moreno Valley.		
Tumey	Fresno	1,647	April 19	April 21			
Tower	Kern	2,469	May 3	May 6	Grew to 2,000 acres in less than 2 hours. Prompted evacuations east of Bakersfield.		
Canyon	Kern	2,278	May 7	May 12	Cause under investigation. Burned in the El Paso Mountains Wilderness.		
Neuralia	Kern	1,196	May 13	May 16	Burned near California City.		
Camp Roberts Bob	Monterey, San Luis Obispo	8,000	May 14	—	Burned in Camp Roberts Impact Range.		
Rowlee	Kern	2,520	May 14	May 15	Prompted evacuations.		
Santa Rosa Island	Santa Barbara	18,379	May 15	June 4	Burned on eastern Santa Rosa Island in Channel Islands National Park. Human-caused.		
River	Kern	3,535	May 18	May 22	Burned in Kern River Canyon and caused the closure of State Route 178.		
Sandy	Ventura	2,183	May 18	May 27	Burned in the Simi Valley and prompted mandatory evacuation orders for more than 23,000 people. Destroyed one structure.		
Bain	Riverside	1,473	May 19	May 29	Prompted evacuations in Riverside and Jurupa Valley. Destroyed one structure and injured five people.		
Border 6	San Diego	2,525	June 1	June 6	The Border 6 Fire burned 1,516 acres in California and 1,009 acres in Mexico.		
Macy	Los Angeles, Kern	1,194	June 5	June 7	Burned near Lancaster.		
Waltz	Mariposa	1,644	June 5	June 9	Burned near Cathey's Valley.		
Wyly	Kern	1,075	June 13	June 16	Burned along State Route 58 near Bealville.		
Shore	Riverside	3,085	June 15	June 25	Burned in the San Timoteo Badlands, prompted evacuations for areas near Redlands.		
Mateo	San Diego	1,377	June 15	June 20	Burned in Camp Pendleton North.		
Lost	Kern	7,834	June 18	June 21	Burned northwest of McKittrick and prompted evacuations.		
Pipeline	San Diego	1,065	July 6	July 8	Burned in Camp Pendleton.		
3-1 Pit	Lassen	1,055	July 7	99%	Burned southeast of McArthur, prompted evacuation warnings.		
Van	Mariposa	1,108	July 8	July 11	Burned south of Catheys Valley.		
Summit	Los Angeles	2,690	July 10	July 23	Prompted evacuations southeast of Llano.		
Pistachio	Kern	1,301	July 11	July 11			
Elephant	Lassen, Plumas, Sierra	13,930	July 11	July 26	Prompted evacuation warnings northeast of Loyalton. Impacted air quality in the Reno–Sparks metropolitan area.		
Thorn	San Diego	1,234	July 15	July 19			
Biscar	Lassen, Washoe (NV)	69,355	July 17	August 1	Burned 15 miles north of Honey Lake and prompted evacuations.		
Rock	Inyo	12,008	July 20	August 5			
Little	Alameda	1,007	July 21	July 26	Prompted evacuations in the Pleasanton Ruby Hill neighborhood.		
Fields	Merced	1,280	July 23	July 28			
Cinder Complex	Inyo	2,784	July 24	August 5			
Fish	Kern	4,201	July 27	August 3	Burned northeast of Arvin.		
Gann	Calaveras	10,339	August 3	August 12	Equipment caused. Burned southwest of San Andreas and prompted evacuations. Destroyed 48 structures and damaged 3. Caused one civilian fatality.		
MP18	Humboldt	7,610	August 7	September 17	Burning north of Hoopa.		
Ridge	Los Angeles	1,134	August 7	August 12	Prompted evacuations near Gorman.		
Bug	Lassen, Sierra, Washoe (NV)	93,733	August 8	August 27	Burned north of Cold Springs and the Reno Stead Airport, prompted evacuations. Burned 12,817 acres in California and 80,916 in Nevada.		
Antelope	Kern, San Luis Obispo	2,410	August 8	August 11	Burned near the junction of State Routes 46 and 41.		
Timber	Monterey	25,435	August 9	97%	Burning southeast of Big Sur Village and prompting evacuations.		
Plains	San Luis Obispo	2,588	August 12	August 14	Burned north of Highway 58.		
Alpaugh	Tulare	2,664	August 19	August 23	Burned in Alpaugh.		
Plaskett	Monterey	30,124	August 26	September 29	Burning east of State Route 1 near Plaskett.		
Lucas	Lake, Mendocino	4,128	September 10	September 21			
Dome	Mariposa	6,159	September 21	October 17	Burning north of Wawona in Yosemite National Park.		
Bouquet Fire	Los Angeles	1,040	October 3	October 13	Burning in the Los Angeles National Forest		
