= Fischbach (Asdorf) =

River in Germany

Location
- Country: Germany
- State: North Rhine-Westphalia

Physical characteristics
- Mouth
  - location: Asdorf
  - coordinates: 50.8653°N 7.8883°E

Basin features
- Progression: Asdorf→ Sieg→ Rhine→ North Sea

Fischbach (German pronunciation: [ˈfɪʃbax]) is a river of North Rhine-Westphalia, Germany. It is 6.6 km long and flows into the Asdorfer Bach near Niederfischbach.

== See also ==
- List of rivers of North Rhine-Westphalia
