= Get It Done (book) =

2022 book by Ayelet Fishbach

- First edition
- Author: Ayelet Fishbach
- Language: English
- Subject: Self-Help
- Genre: Non-fiction
- Publisher: Little, Brown and Company
- Publication date: January 2022

Get It Done: Surprising Lessons from the Science of Motivation is a nonfiction book by psychologist Ayelet Fishbach, published by Little, Brown Spark in January, 2022. Featured in the Financial Times, Scientific American, and Fast Company, the book is a layperson's guide to understanding what motivates people to set their personal goals, what keeps them from getting to work and incrementally advancing towards their fulfillment, and what practical recommendations they may use to bridge the gap between goal setting and accomplishment.
