= Dome Fire (2026) =

2026 wildfire in Yosemite National Park

- Part of the 2026 California wildfires
- Aerial firefighting operations on the Dome Fire on September 19, 2026
- Date: September 15, 2026
- Location: Yosemite National Park
- Coordinates: 37.57°N 119.61289°W

Impacts
- Deaths: 2

Ignition
- Cause: Abandoned campfire

Map
- Location of fire in California

The Dome Fire was a wildfire that burned 6,788 acres (2,747 ha) in Yosemite National Park in Mariposa County, California in 2026. The fire was reported on September 15 near Chilnualna Falls, near Wawona, and was fully contained on October 17.

Two pilots died when their Eurocopter AS332 Super Puma helicopter crashed while conducting water drops on September 20. At the peak of firefighting operations, more than 1,000 personnel and 17 helicopters were deployed. The fire cost $55 million to fight and contain.

== Fire progression ==
The Dome Fire started in the forest near Chilnualna Falls.

The Dome Fire was reported on the morning of September 15, 2026, approximately 1/4 mi (0.4 km) north of Chilnualna Falls in the southern portion of Yosemite National Park. By later that day, it had grown to approximately 100 acres (40 ha) and was spreading north and northeast through brush and timber. Firefighters secured portions of the southern and western flanks, and there were no immediate threats to developed areas or infrastructure.

The fire expanded rapidly over the next two days in steep backcountry terrain. By September 17, it had reached 1,177 acres (476 ha). Gusty ridge winds carried embers ahead of the main fire, producing numerous spot fires to the north, including in the footprint of the 2017 Empire Fire. Ground crews constructed handline while helicopters made water drops along the flanks. By that evening, the fire was 10 percent contained.

By September 19, the fire had grown to 2,335 acres (945 ha) and was 15 percent contained. It continued moving toward areas burned by the Empire and South Fork fires.

The fire reached 2,667 acres (1,079 ha) on September 20, with continued spotting near Turner Meadow and Empire Meadows. Later that day, a contract firefighting helicopter conducting water-dropping operations crashed near Ostrander Lake, killing both pilots.

By September 21, the fire had grown to 3,222 acres (1,304 ha) and remained 15 percent contained. Growth slowed over the following several days as crews strengthened containment lines. By September 23, it had reached 3,795 acres (1,536 ha), with most activity occurring on the north and northeast sides within the Empire Fire footprint.

By September 28, the Dome Fire had burned 5,215 acres (2,110 ha) and was 30 percent contained. Firefighters worked to secure the perimeter near Bridalveil Creek, Empire Meadows, and Horse Ridge. The fire continued to spread on its eastern side, reaching 6,159 acres (2,492 ha) by October 2. Low humidity and gusty winds contributed to spotting near Bridalveil Creek, while crews established a contingency line near Glacier Point Road.

The fire reached 6,815 acres (2,758 ha) on October 7. Much of the remaining firefighting effort focused on the eastern backcountry perimeter. By October 10, crews had completed the firelines along the eastern flank. This effectively stopped the spread. Firefighters subsequently removed equipment and began repairing damage caused by suppression activities. The fire was 95 percent contained on October 13 and fully contained on October 17. Its final reported size was 6,788 acres (2,747 ha).

Photo of the Dome Fire from above

Photo of the Dome fire with Half Dome on the left hand side

== Growth and containment ==
Fire containment status Gray: contained; Red: active; %: percent contained;
Date	Total area burned	Personnel	Containment
Sep 15	100 acres (40 ha)	...	
Sep 16	1,177 acres (476 ha)	...	
Sep 17	1,177 acres (476 ha)	376 personnel	
Sep 18	1,977 acres (800 ha)	386 personnel	
Sep 19	2,335 acres (945 ha)	497 personnel	
Sep 20	2,667 acres (1,079 ha)	525 personnel	
Sep 21	3,222 acres (1,304 ha)	581 personnel	
Sep 22	3,420 acres (1,384 ha)	784 personnel	
Sep 23	3,795 acres (1,536 ha)	840 personnel	
Sep 24	4,030 acres (1,631 ha)	789 personnel	
Sep 25	4,258 acres (1,723 ha)	781 personnel	
Sep 26	4,498 acres (1,820 ha)	781 personnel	
Sep 27	4,809 acres (1,946 ha)	781 personnel	
Sep 28	5,215 acres (2,110 ha)	808 personnel	
Sep 29	5,392 acres (2,182 ha)	796 personnel	
Sep 30	5,585 acres (2,260 ha)	932 personnel	
Oct 1	5,777 acres (2,338 ha)	775 personnel	
Oct 2	6,159 acres (2,492 ha)	798 personnel	
Oct 3	6,632 acres (2,684 ha)	765 personnel	
Oct 4	6,736 acres (2,726 ha)	811 personnel	
Oct 5	6,760 acres (2,736 ha)	1063 personnel	
Oct 6	6,806 acres (2,754 ha)	915 personnel	
Oct 7	6,815 acres (2,758 ha)	875 personnel	
Oct 8	6,815 acres (2,758 ha)	916 personnel	
Oct 9	6,829 acres (2,764 ha)	968 personnel	
Oct 10	6,829 acres (2,764 ha)	935 personnel	
Oct 11	6,805 acres (2,754 ha)	926 personnel	
Oct 12	6,788 acres (2,747 ha)	906 personnel	
Oct 13	6,788 acres (2,747 ha)	—	
Oct 14	6,788 acres (2,747 ha)	—	
Oct 17	6,788 acres (2,747 ha)	—	
