= Fischbach (surname) =

Fischbach (German pronunciation: [ˈfɪʃˌbax]) is a German-origin surname. Notable people with the surname include:

- Adolf Fischbach (1920–1972), Oberleutnant in the Luftwaffe during World War II
- Ayelet Fishbach, professor of Behavioral Science and Marketing at the University of Chicago
- Claudia Fischbach, German biophysicist
- Dan Fishbach, American theatre director/producer
- Flora Fischbach (born 1991), French singer, songwriter
- Friedrich Fischbach (1839–1908), German textile designer
- Gerald Fischbach (born 1938), American neuroscientist
- Greg Fischbach, founder of video game publisher Acclaim Entertainment
- Johann Fischbach, (1797–1871), Austrian painter
- Johannes Fischbach (born 1988), German mountain biker
- Marc Fischbach (born 1946), Luxembourg politician
- Mark Fischbach (born 1989), American YouTuber known as "Markiplier"
- Marcel Fischbach (1914–1980), Luxembourg politician, journalist, and diplomat
- Matthias Fischbach (born 1988), German politician
- Michael Fischbach (born 1980), American chemist, microbiologist, and geneticist
- Michelle Fischbach (born 1965), Minnesota politician
- Oskar Georg Fischbach (1880–1967), German lawyer
- Peter Fishbach (born 1947), American tennis player
- Stephen Fishbach (born 1979), People Magazine blogger and Survivor contestant
