= Bain Fire =

2026 wildfire in California, United States

- Date: May 19, 2026 – May 29, 2026
- Location: Jurupa Valley, California, U.S.
- Coordinates: 33.987°N 117.481°W

Statistics
- Perimeter: 100% contained
- Burned area: 1,497 acres (606 ha)

Impacts
- Deaths: 0
- Injuries: 5 (1 firefighter, 4 civilian)
- Structures destroyed: 1, 5 damaged

Ignition
- Cause: Under investigation

The Bain Fire was a large wildfire that burned near Jurupa Valley, in Riverside County, California.

== Progression ==
The Bain Fire ignited around 11:24 am on May 19, 2026. The fire rapidly spread, burning 20 acres by 12:06 pm. A status report at 1:34 pm said the fire was 100 acres, still growing quickly. The fire burned 250 acres by 2:12 pm, and 600 acres by 3:09 pm.

The fire was mapped out at 907 acres at 5:24 pm, and had numerous evacuation orders issued. By 8:41 pm, the Bain Fire had burned 1,375 acres and was 10% contained, with over 100 firefighters fighting the fire.

The fire grew to 1,456 acres by May 20, with 528 firefighters fighting the fire May 21.

The fire was 100% contained on May 29.

== Impact ==
The fire resulted in five injuries, including four civilian injuries and one firefighter injury.

Additionally, one structure was destroyed, and another five were damaged.

== Growth and containment table ==
Date	Acres burned (hectares)	Personnel	Containment	Citation
May 19	1,375 acres (556 ha)	100		
May 20	1,456 acres (589 ha)	100		
May 21	1,497 acres (606 ha)	528		
May 22	1,497 acres (606 ha)	528		
May 23	1,497 acres (606 ha)	528		
May 24	1,497 acres (606 ha)	425		
May 25	1,497 acres (606 ha)	425		
May 26	1,497 acres (606 ha)	425		
May 27	1,497 acres (606 ha)	425		
May 28	1,497 acres (606 ha)	425		
May 29	1,497 acres (606 ha)	0		
