= Asdorf =

River in Germany

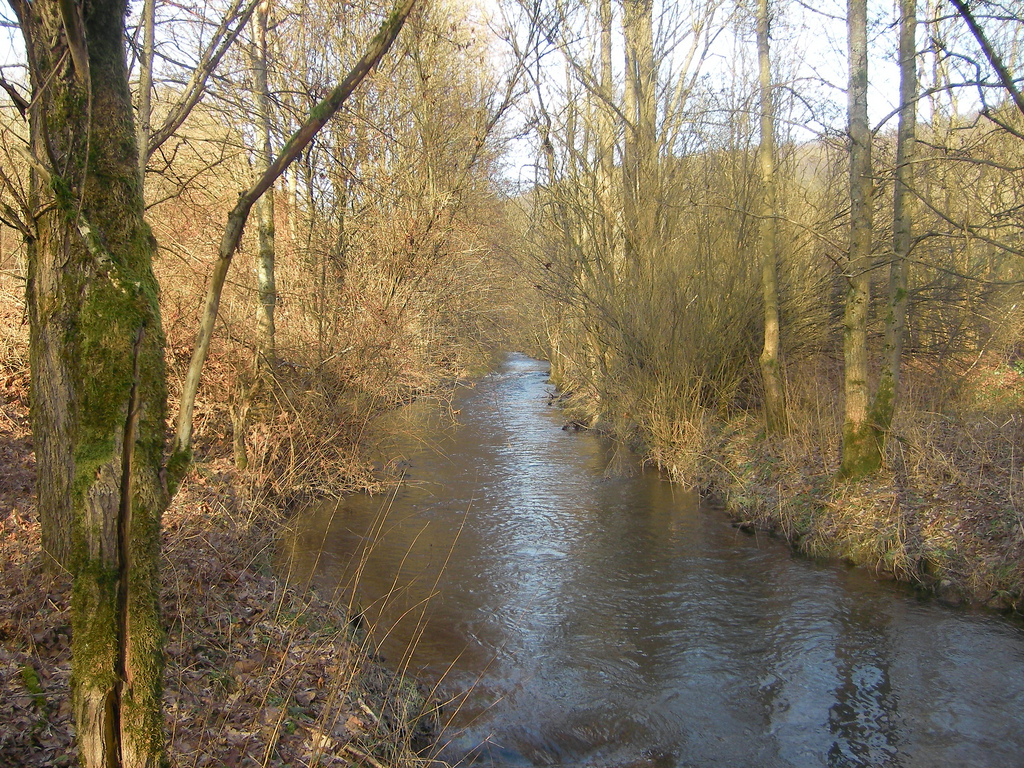
- The Asdorf between Oberasdorf (district of Niederfischbach) and district Niederfischbach.

Location
- Country: Germany
- States: North Rhine-Westphalia and Rhineland-Palatinate

Physical characteristics
- Mouth
  - location: Sieg
  - coordinates: 50.8088°N 7.8778°E
- Length: 20.7 km (12.9 mi)

Basin features
- Progression: Sieg→ Rhine→ North Sea

Asdorf (also: Asdorfer Bach, in its upper course: Weibe) is a river of North Rhine-Westphalia and Rhineland-Palatinate, Germany. It flows into the Sieg in Kirchen.

== See also ==
- List of rivers of North Rhine-Westphalia
- List of rivers of Rhineland-Palatinate
