= Fischbach (Nuremberg) =

- Stadtteil of Nuremberg
- Coat of arms
- Interactive map of Fischbach
- Location within Germany Location within Bavaria
- Coordinates: 49°25′16″N 11°11′37″E
- Country: Germany
- State: Bavaria
- Admin. region: Middle Franconia
- District: Urban district
- City: Nuremberg

Population (2019-12-31)
  - Total: 5,073
- Time zone: UTC+01:00 (CET)
  - Summer (DST): UTC+02:00 (CEST)
- Postal codes: 90475
- Dialling codes: 0911
- Vehicle registration: N

Fischbach (German pronunciation: [ˈfɪʃˌbax]) was an independent municipality near Nuremberg (officially Fischbach b. Nuremberg) and is a district of the city of Nuremberg (Statistical District 9 - Eastern Outlying City, Statistical District 96) since July 1, 1972.

== Geography ==
Fischbach is located in the southeast of Nuremberg, surrounded by the Lorenzer Reichswald (de), a 60 square mile large forest, and traversed by the Fischbach creek. The town is also bordered by the Federal Highway 9 in the east and the Federal Highway 4 in the south and southwest.

== History ==
Fischbach was first mentioned in a document in 1339 with the name “Fischpekken”. Fischbach was created by imperial ministerials as part of the development of the Nuremberg Reichswald (de), the imperial forest around Nuremberg, as a place for honey hunting (in Franconia Zeidelgut). The “Vischebekken von Vischebach”, first mentioned in 1330, were granted to burgmannen of the burgraves of Nuremberg as fiefdoms from 1339. Around 1350 they became over-indebted and had to sell their possessions to the imperial city. Their likely seat was probably at the location of the Harsdorf's Mansion (see Harsdorfsche Schloss below).

The village was set on fire during the Feud between the city of Nuremberg and the Margrave Albrecht Achilles of Brandenburg-Ansbach in 1449. It was burned down again in the Second Margrave War. The Harsdorf'sche Schloss and the Pellerschloss were also completely destroyed. During the Thirty Years' War Fischbach was also exposed to arson and looting. After the war, numerous Austrian exiles settled there.

=== Mansions ===
Fischbach, like Mögeldorf and Erlenstegen, had a high density of mansion buildings belonging to families of the Nuremberg Patriciate:

==== Harsdorfsche Schloss ====
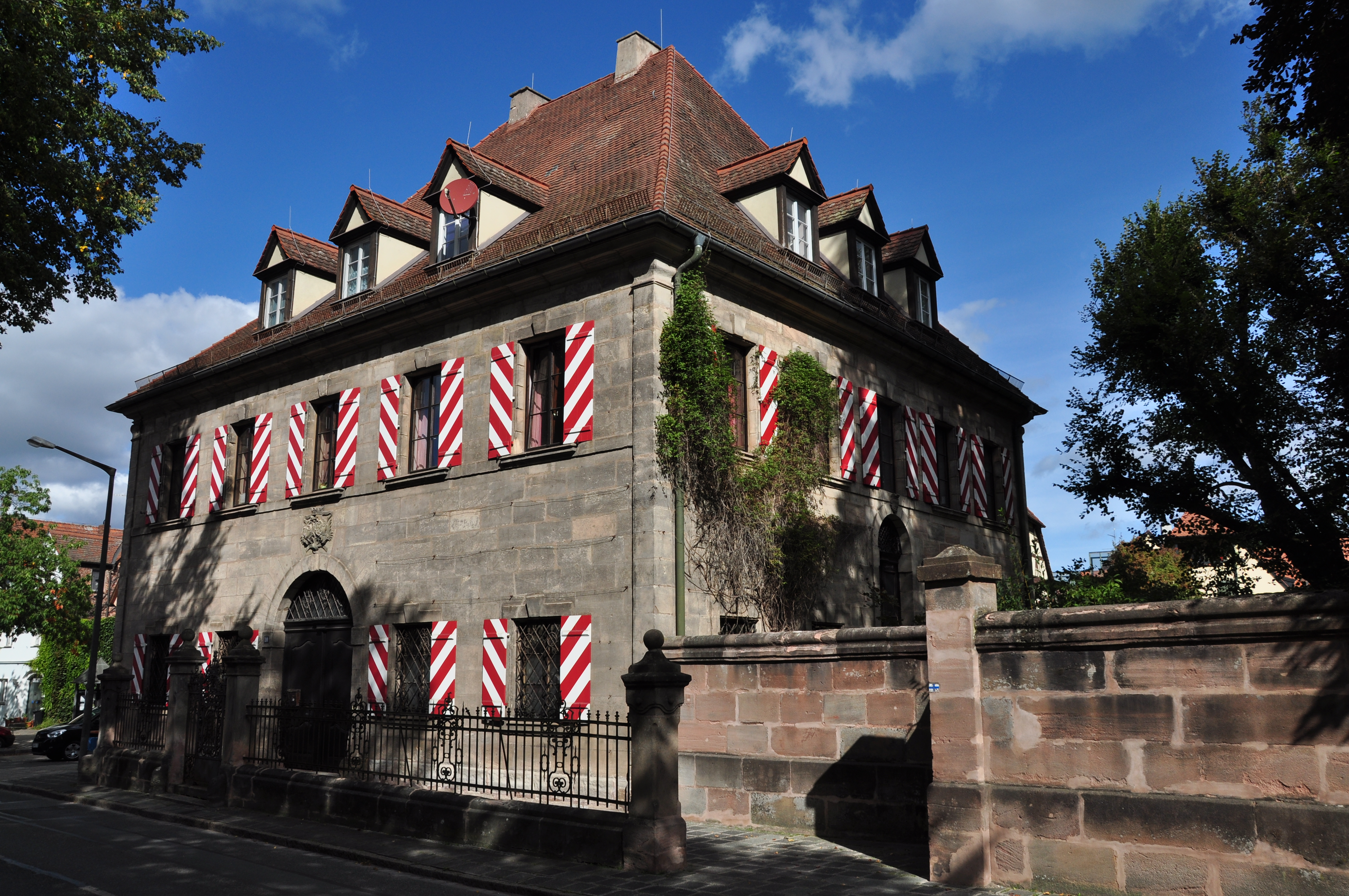
Harsdorf’sches Schloss

The “Harsdorfsche Schloss”, Fischbacher Hauptstraße 197/199, was sold by Veit Pfinzing to his brother-in-law Karl Holzschuher in 1405. In 1515, Karl Holzschuher's grandsons Pankraz and Hans “opened” their headquarters to the city of Nuremberg. In 1537, Wolf, Peter and Christoph Harsdörffer acquired the castle from Hans and Sebastian Holzschuher, which is still owned today by the old Nuremberg patrician family, who later became barons Harsdorf von Enderndorf. When it was rebuilt after 1553, the so-called “old” castle was given its current shape by reusing existing components. In the years after 1771, the Nuremberg governor Jobst Christoph Harsdorfer (1721–1786) built the New Palace on the site of the old seat and on the site of the old dilapidated barn on the street. In 1943 both houses were badly damaged by bombs, but were restored.

==== Scheurlsche Schloss ====
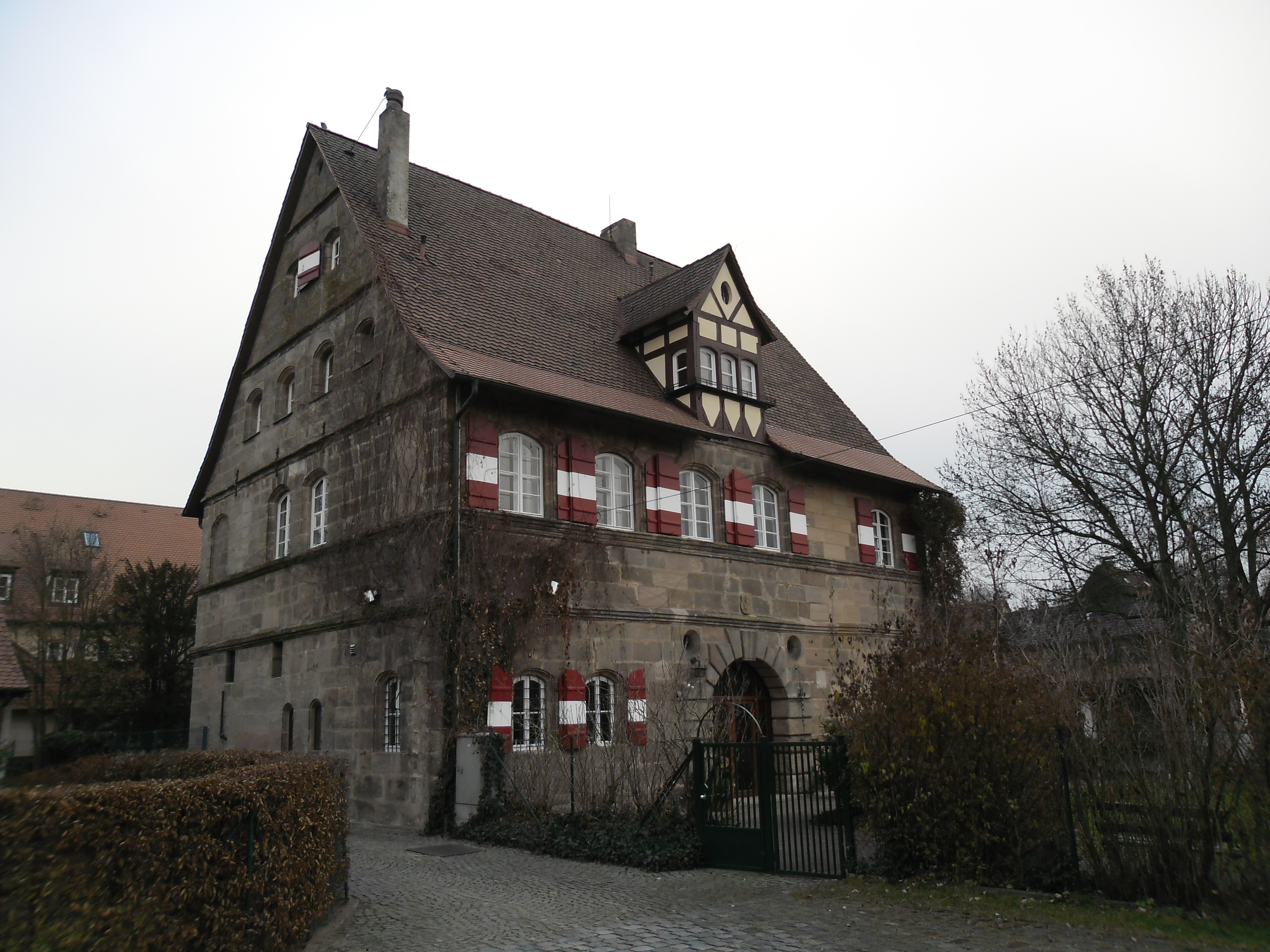
Scheurl’sches Schloss

The “Scheurlsche Schloss”, Fischbacher Hauptstraße 164/166, was located on an old Zeidel estate in the Lorenz Forest and was therefore an imperial fiefdom. Supposedly owned by Rummel around 1369, it later passed to Sebald Holzschuher (died 1483). A manor house is mentioned in 1497 when it was sold to Michael Behaim, whose son Friedrich opened it to the imperial city of Nuremberg in 1517. The other owners were Anton Koberger in 1532, a son of the well-known printer and publisher Anton Koberger, who, among other things published the Nuremberg Chronicle (which in Germany is known as The Schedel World Chronicle) in 1493, but he died in Fischbach that same year. In 1535, the humanist and Nuremberg councilor Christoph von Scheurl acquired the mansion for the widow of his brother Albrecht, who was murdered in 1531. Since then, the castle has been owned by the well-known patrician family, who were elevated to Baron Scheurl von Defersdorf in 1884. The house has been preserved in the form it got after the destruction in 1552. The entrance is a two-story sandstone gatehouse built in 1729 with the Scheurl coat of arms above the basket arch gate.

==== Pellerschloss ====
The “Pellerschloss”, Pellergasse 3a, is one of the few examples of a typical 16th century mansion that has been preserved in its structural integrity. Two protruding half-timbered upper floors with a gable roof and dwarf hip rest on a stone base with only embrasures, and slanted support beams emphasize the expansive superstructure. The choir was planned into the wooden structure. Above the arched entrance on the north side is the coat of arms of the Peller von Schoppershof patrician family, which died out in 1870 and owned the castle from 1687. It was once surrounded by a moat that has now been filled in. It belonged to a number of patrician families over time. Today it belongs to the city of Nuremberg; Wedding ceremonies are held in the ground floor hall and the rooms can be rented for events.

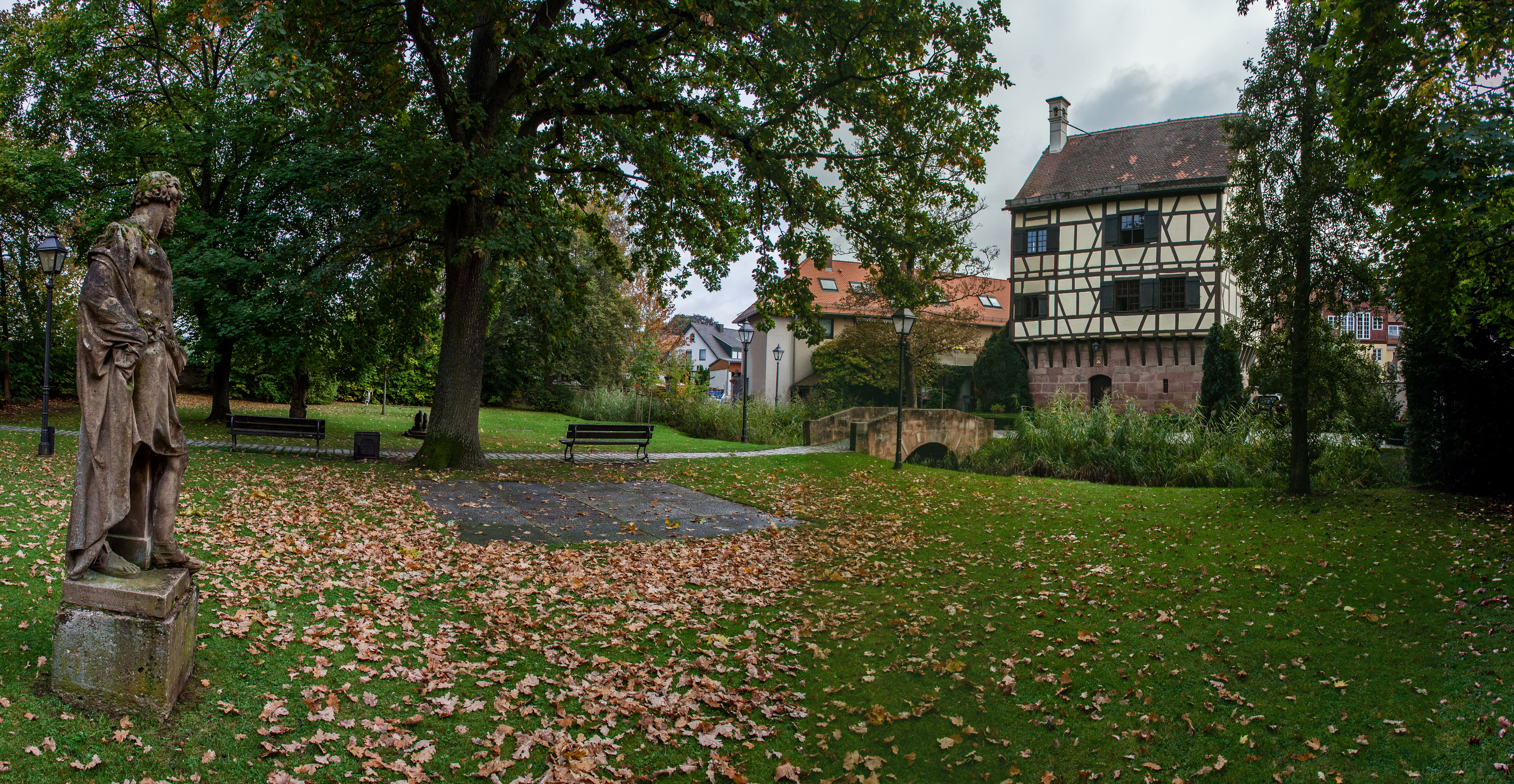
Pellerschloss with garden, panoramic view, October 2013

=== Modern history ===
During the First World War, a camp for Russian prisoners of war was set up between Regensburger Straße and Fischbach; The area has since been called Russenwiese. During the Second World War, a Gestapo penal camp known as a labor education camp (in German de:Arbeitserziehungslager) was located there from October 1942 to August 1943. The prison conditions were comparable to an SS concentration camp. After the destruction caused by the air raid in August 1943, the camp was relocated to Langenzenn in the Fürth district.

During the two bombing nights in Fischbach on August 10th/11th and 27th/28th 1943, strong British bomber units targeted both the Gestapo camp and an 8.8cm anti-aircraft gun battery stationed nearby.

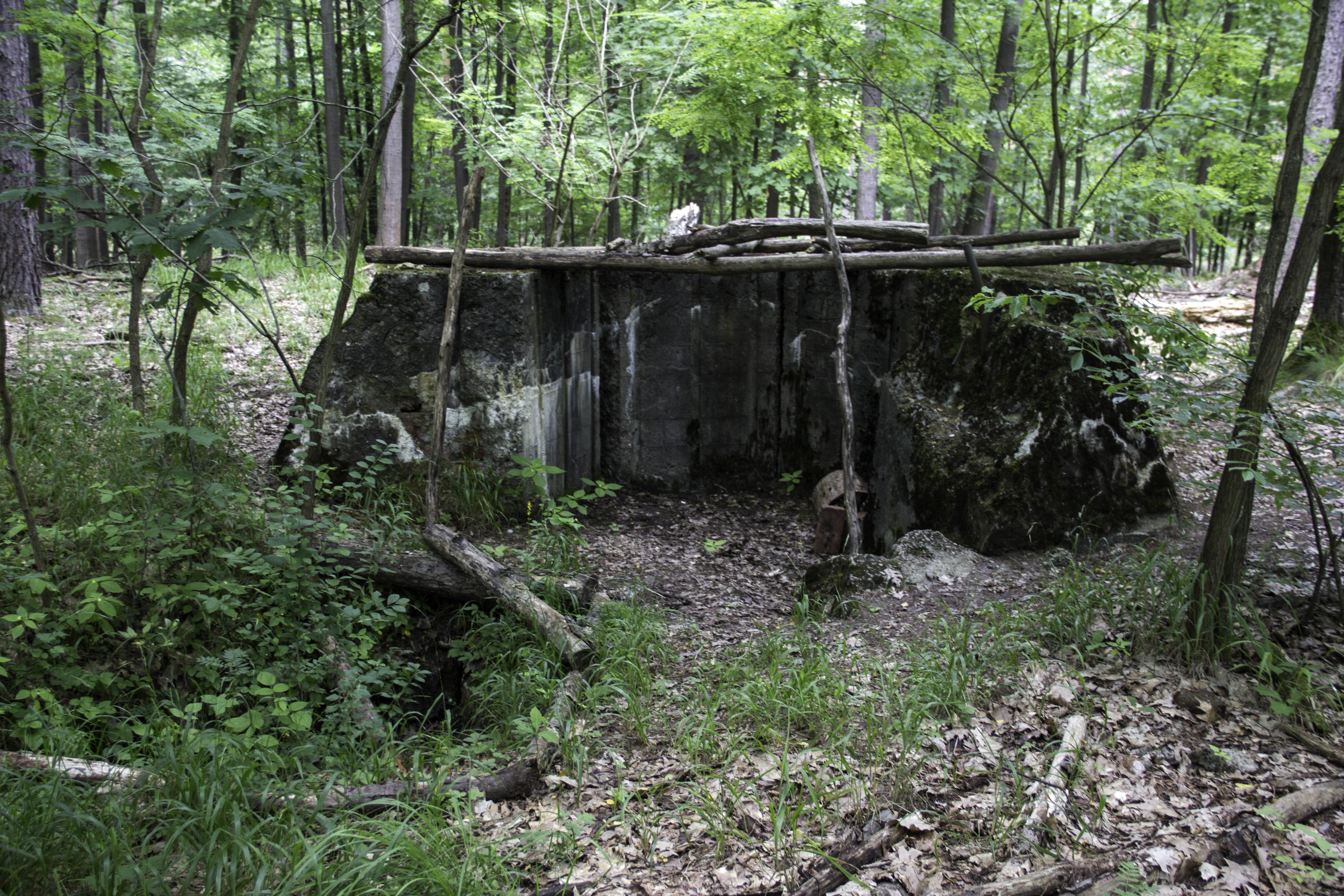
Anti-aircraft position near Fischbach in World War II

After the end of the war, the so-called Moll Railway to Fischbach existed from 1947. This narrow-gauge railroad was built to transport large quantities of rubble from Nuremberg's old town, 90% of which had been destroyed, to a designated forest area near Fischbach for final storage. There was a separate depot for the up to 18 steam locomotives on what is now the FCN site. The route near Fischbach changed frequently in order to ensure that debris was deposited in the forests as evenly as possible and not to build up another mountain that could be seen from afar, such as the Silberbuck or the Föhrenbuck, at the harbor. The rubble railway ceased operations in 1950.

On July 1, 1972, the community of Fischbach with its parts of Altenfurt, Birnthon and Moorenbrunn was incorporated into Nuremberg as part of the municipal reform.
