= Timber Fire =

2026 California wildfire

- Part of the 2026 2026 California wildfires
- Date: August 8, 2026 (3 months ago)
- Location: Monterey County, California
- Coordinates: 36.224857°N 121.72983°W

Statistics
- Perimeter: 97% contained
- Burned area: 25,352 acres (10,260 ha)

Impacts
- Injuries: 1 firefighter
- Evacuated: Nearly 1,100

Ignition
- Cause: Under investigation

The Timber Fire is a wildfire currently burning along the Big Sur coast in Monterey County, California, California. The fire started on August 8, 2026, forcing the closure of parts of California State Route 1 and the historic Henry Miller Memorial Library. Nearby residents have been ordered to evacuate.

The fire threatened endangered California condors held for rehabilitation at the Big Sur Condor Sanctuary, after the fire cut off staff access to the sanctuary. The birds, 868 and 340, were later released after Cal Fire firefighters escorted a staff member to the site.

As of October 18, 2026 the fire is approximately 25,352 acres and is 97% contained. Nearly 1,100 residents were forced to evacuate as a result of the fire.

The cause of this fire is currently under investigation.
