= Matthias Fischbach =

German politician (born 1988)

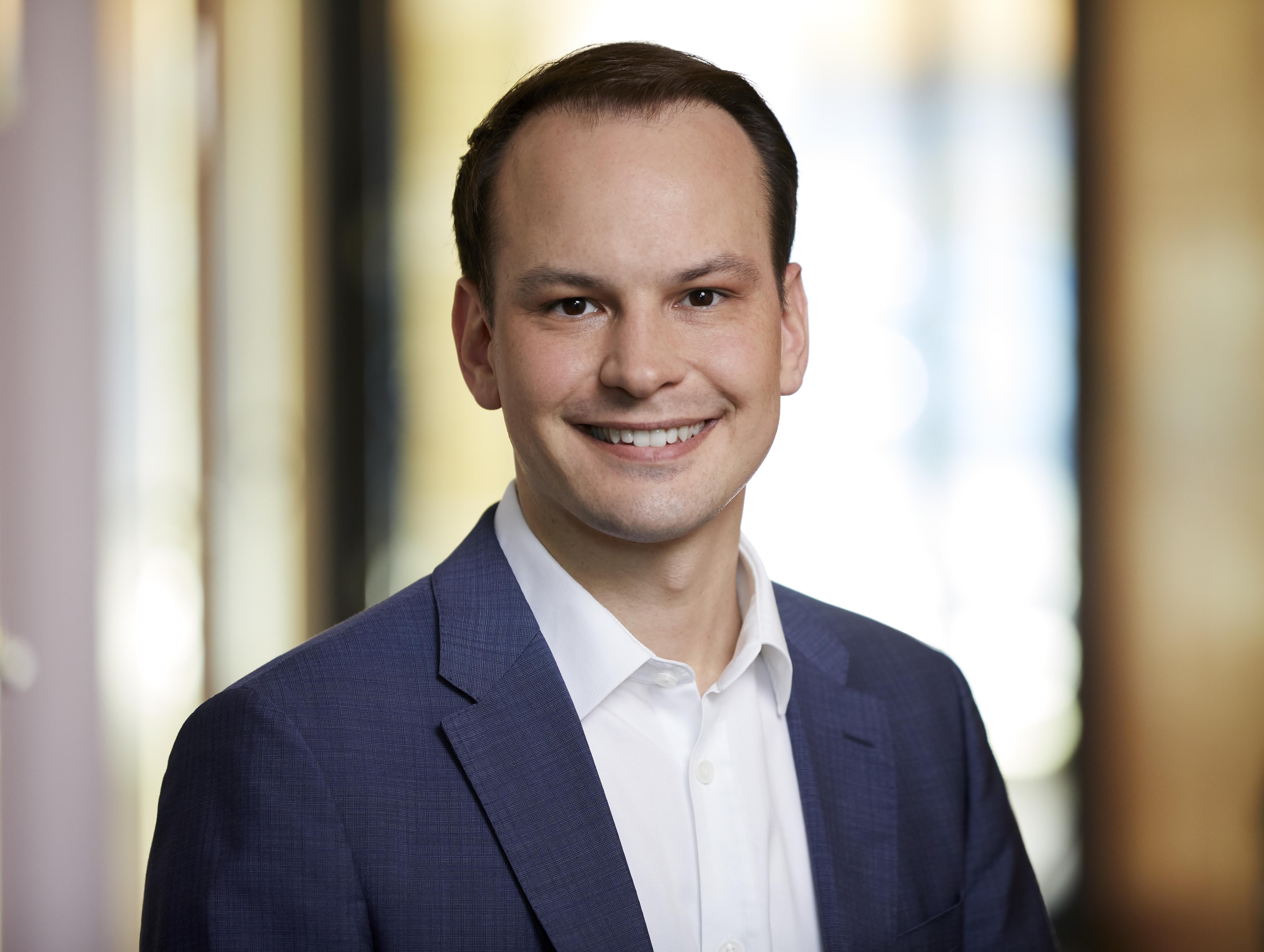
- Fischbach in 2019

Member of the Landtag of Bavaria
- In office 5 November 2018 – 30 October 2023
- Constituency: Middle Franconia

Personal details
- Born: 8 October 1988 (age 37) Erlangen
- Party: Free Democratic Party (since 2007)

Matthias Fischbach (born 8 October 1988 in Erlangen) is a German politician serving as chairman of the Free Democratic Party in Bavaria since 2026. From 2018 to 2023, he was a member of the Landtag of Bavaria. From 2011 to 2013, he served as chairman of the Young Liberals in Bavaria.
