= Ayelet Fishbach =

Israeli business professor

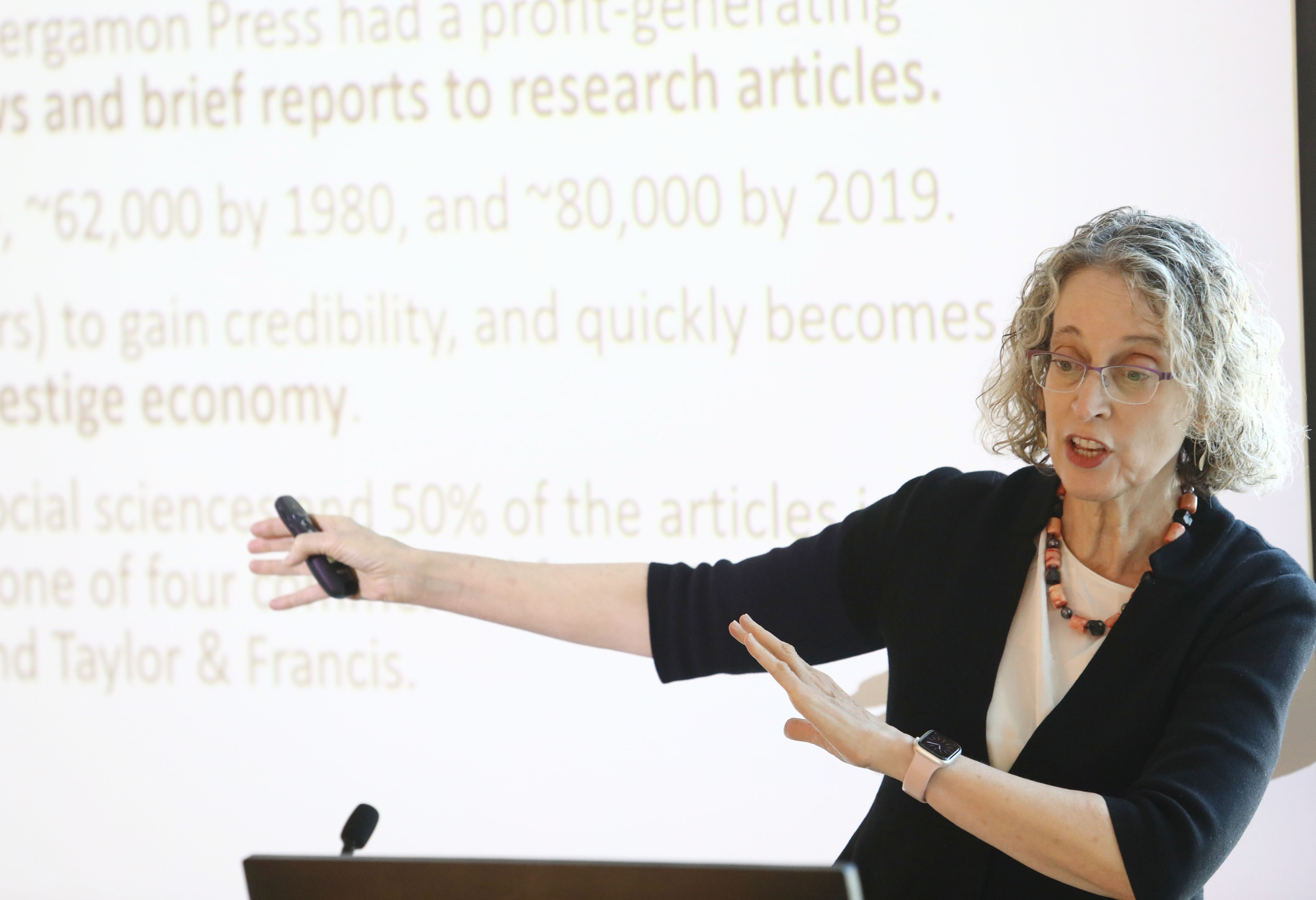
Professor Ayelet Fishbach, presenting a talk at a conference.

Ayelet Fishbach (Hebrew: איילת פישבך) is the Eric J. Gleacher Distinguished Service Professor of Behavioral Science and Marketing at the University of Chicago Booth School of Business She is a leading researcher in motivation science, self-regulation, and goal pursuit, and a past president of the Society for the Science of Motivation, and the International Social Cognition Network.

== Life and education ==
Fishbach completed all three of her degrees at Tel Aviv University. She received her B.A. in Psychology and Education (1992, Magna Cum Laude), her M.A. in Psychology (1995, Summa Cum Laude), and her Ph.D. in Psychology (1999, with distinction). In 2000, her doctoral dissertation received both the Society of Experimental Psychology (SESP) Dissertation Award and the Landau Foundation Dissertation Award for Social Sciences and Humanities.

She went on to a postdoctoral fellowship at the University of Maryland (2000-2002), supported by a Fulbright scholarship from the United States-Israel Educational Foundation.

She joined the University of Chicago Booth School of Business as an Assistant Professor in 2002, was promoted to Associate Professor in 2006, and became a full Professor in 2009. She was associate editor of Journal of Personality and Social Psychology and Psychological Science.

== Research ==
Fishbach's research spans social psychology, consumer behavior, and organizational behavior, with a focus on motivation and self-regulation. Her core contributions include:

- Goal systems theory: developed with Arie Kruglanski and Catalina Kopetz, this framework examines how people organize and pursue multiple goals simultaneously, including how goals and means relate, how subgoals substitute for or complement each other, and how goal conflict is managed.
- Self-regulation and temptation: Fishbach has extensively studied how people resist temptation, including the role of counteractive self-control, anticipatory strategies, and the interplay between explicit and implicit mechanisms.
- Feedback and motivation: her work examines how positive and negative feedback differentially affect goal persistence, disengagement, and learning. This body of work includes the finding that people systematically avoid learning from failure.
- Intrinsic motivation: she has studied how immediate rewards, shared experiences, and goal framing sustain intrinsic motivation over time.
- Social dimensions of motivation: research on how people coordinate goal pursuit with others, the motivating effects of social observation, and how interpersonal relationships shape self-regulation.

Her work has appeared in top journals including the Journal of Personality and Social Psychology, Psychological Science, Journal of Consumer Research, and Journal of Experimental Psychology: General, among others. She has published over 100 peer-reviewed articles and book chapters.

== Books ==
- Fujita, K., Fishbach, A., & Liberman, N. (2025). The Psychological Quest for Meaning. Guilford. ISBN 978-1-4625-5856-8
- Kruglanski, A. W., Fishbach, A., & Kopetz, C. (2023). Goal Systems Theory: Psychological Processes and Applications. Oxford University Press. ISBN 978-0-19-768746-8.
- Fishbach, A. (2022). Get It Done: Surprising Lessons from the Science of Motivation. Little, Brown and Company. (Gold Winner, Nautilus Book Award) ISBN 978-0-316-53835-0.
- Kopetz, C., & Fishbach, A. (Eds.) (2017). The Motivation–Cognition Interface: From the Lab to the Real World. Psychology Press, Taylor & Francis. ISBN 978-1-351-69469-8.

== Awards and honors ==
- Society for Consumer Psychology, Distinguished Scientific Contribution Award, 2023
- IBM Corporation Faculty Scholar, 2019–2023
- Society of Experimental Social Psychology, Career Trajectory Award, 2018
- Mercator Fellow, German Research Foundation, 2018
- Fellow, Society for Personality and Social Psychology, 2015
- Fellow, Association for Psychological Science, 2013
- Beatrice Foods Co. Faculty Scholar, Booth School of Business, 2011–2012
- Neubauer Faculty Fellow, University of Chicago, 2008–2009
- Provost's Teaching Award, University of Chicago, 2006–2007
- FMC Scholar, University of Chicago, 2006–2008
- William S. Fishman Scholar, University of Chicago, 2003–2004
- Society of Experimental Social Psychology, Dissertation Award, 2000
- Landau Foundation Dissertation Award for Social Sciences and Humanities, 2000
- Fulbright Postdoctoral Scholar, United States–Israel Educational Foundation, 2000

== Editorial and service roles ==
Fishbach served as President of the Society for the Science of Motivation (2019–2021) and President of the International Social Cognition Network (ISCON, 2015–2018).

She has served as Associate Editor for the Journal of Personality and Social Psychology: Attitudes and Social Cognition and Psychological Science, and on the editorial boards of numerous journals including the Journal of Consumer Research, Motivation Science, Organizational Behavior and Human Decision Processes, and Personality and Social Psychology Bulletin.

She has also served as a grant reviewer for the National Institutes of Health (NIH), the National Science Foundation (NSF), and several international funding bodies including the Israeli Science Foundation and the U.S.–Israel Binational Science Foundation.
