= Kurt Edward Fishback =

American photographer (born 1942)

- Born: 1942 (age 83–84); Sacramento, California, U.S.
- Education: Sacramento City College (AA), San Francisco Art Institute (BFA),University of California, Davis (MFA), Cornell University
- Occupations: Photographer, educator
- Known for: Portrait photography
- Spouse(s): Susan Jane Seymour (m. 1966); Joan Henderson Johnson (m. 1969); Cassandra Reeves

Kurt Edward Fishback (born 1942) is an American photographer and educator, noted for his portraits of other artists and photographers. He has also worked in drawing, sculpture, and as a ceramicist.

== Life and career ==
Kurt Edward Fishback was born in 1942, in Sacramento, California. Son of photographer Glen Fishback, he was exposed to art photography at an early age. He attended McClatchy High School.

Fishback studied art at Sacramento City College (AA degree), San Francisco Art Institute (BFA degree, 1967), the University of California, Davis (MFA degree, 1970), and Cornell University.

He started exhibiting his work in 1963. Fishback has been involved in many exhibitions including at the; San Francisco Museum of Modern Art (SFMoMA, 1983), and Crocker Art Museum. His work is represented in collections, including at the San Francisco Museum of Modern Art, San Francisco Art Institute, and Museum of Contemporary Crafts (now the Museum of Arts and Design) in New York City.

In the 1980s he taught at Weber State College (now Weber State University) in Ogden, Utah. He has also taught at American River College, a community college in Sacramento.

He has published several books, including, Art in Residence: West Coast Artists in Their Space (2000), which includes portraits of 74 artists, including Ansel Adams, Wayne Thiebaud, Judy Chicago, Brett Weston, and Jock Sturges. Other artist portraits made by Kurt include Cornell Capa, André Kertész, Mary Ellen Mark, Chuck Close and Robert Mapplethorpe.

== Personal life ==
Fishback resides in Antelope in Sacramento County, California, with his wife Cassandra Reeves, who works as a collage artist. He was previously married to Susan Jane Seymour, and Joan Henderson Johnson.

== Publications ==
- Art in Residence: West Coast Artists in Their Space. (2000), ISBN 0-936085-59-2
- Portrait of the Artist. (2008), ISBN 978-1-4357-5429-4
- Nature Mandalas. (2010), ISBN 978-0-557-42232-6
- Cloud Mandalas. (2010), ISBN 978-0-557-45201-9
- Artists Portraits New York 1982. (2012), ISBN 978-1300279624
- Knowing - A Study In Spiritual Genealogy. (2014), ISBN 978-1312467408
- 51 Portraits of Women Artists. (2015), ISBN 978-1312821804
- 71 Women in Art. (2017), ISBN 978-1365872211
- There's Light There. (2019), ISBN 978-0359454914
