= Stella Brooks =

American jazz musician

Stella Brooks (born October 24, 1910, Seattle, Washington – December 13, 2002, San Francisco, California) was an American jazz vocalist.

Brooks began singing in San Francisco early in the 1930s. She moved to New York City in 1937, where she sang in the ensembles of Art Hodes, Sidney Bechet, Joe Sullivan, Georg Brunis and Frank Newton among others. She played at the New York Town Hall in 1946. During this time she befriended Tennessee Williams and Billie Holiday; she was sometimes called "The white Billie Holiday". Williams wrote about Brooks in his memoirs.

Brooks's career faded in the 1950s, during which time she played locally in clubs in New York. In 1962, she left the music industry and moved back to San Francisco. In 1981, Folkways Records released some of her material on Songs of the 1940s: Diverse Songs and Moods.
