= Locus iste (Bruckner) =

1869 motet composed by Anton Bruckner

- Motet by Anton Bruckner
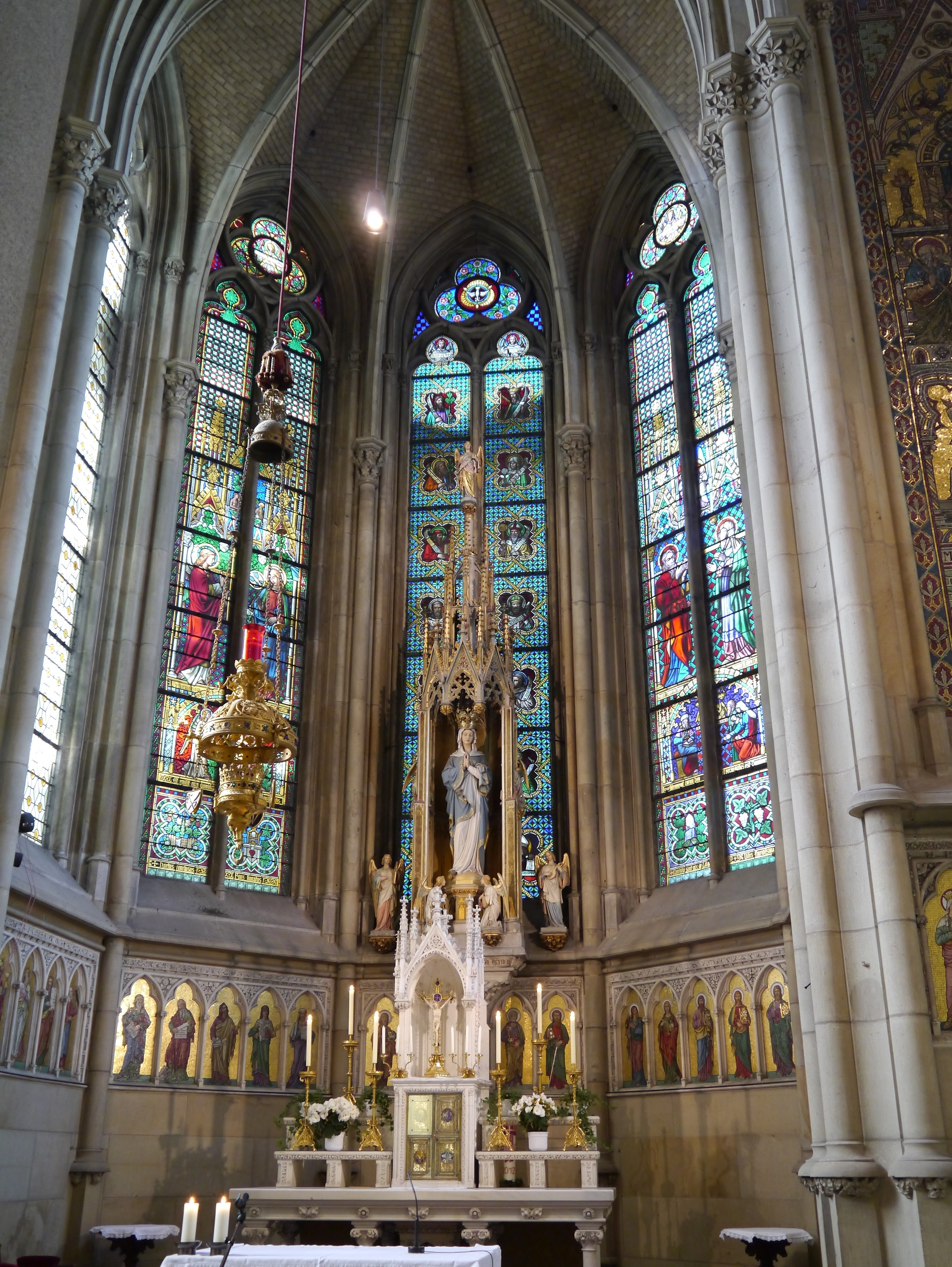
- The votive chapel in Linz Cathedral
- Key: C major
- Catalogue: WAB 23
- Text: Gradual Locus iste
- Language: Latin
- Performed: 29 October 1869: Linz
- Published: 1886: Vienna
- Scoring: SATB choir

Locus iste (English: This place), WAB 23, is a sacred motet composed by Anton Bruckner in 1869. The text is the Latin gradual Locus iste for the annual celebration of a church's dedication. The incipit, Locus iste a Deo factus est, translates to "This place was made by God". Bruckner set it for four unaccompanied voices, intended for the dedication of the Votivkapelle (votive chapel) at the New Cathedral in Linz, Austria, where Bruckner had been a cathedral organist. It was the first motet that Bruckner composed in Vienna. It was published in 1886, together with three other gradual motets.

As a composition with no obvious technical difficulty, it has been performed by church choirs and by professionals, often to celebrate church dedications.

== History ==
Bruckner composed Locus iste on 11 August 1869. It was intended for the dedication ceremony of the Votivkapelle (votive chapel) at the New Cathedral in Linz, Austria. The New Cathedral was under construction since 1862, and the Votivkapelle was completed in 1869 as its first section. At that time Bruckner lived in Vienna, teaching at the Vienna Conservatory as a professor of harmony and counterpoint, and at the Vienna University as a part-time lecturer from 1876. He had a strong connection to the Old Cathedral of Linz, where he had been the organist from 1855 to 1868. He had already been commissioned by Bishop Franz-Josef Rudigier to compose a Festive Cantata for the laying of the foundation stone of the new cathedral, and composed Preiset den Herrn (Praise the Lord) on a text by Maximilian Pammesberger, which was performed on 1 May 1862 on the building site.

The Latin text of Locus iste is the gradual Locus iste, part of the proper of the mass for Kirchweih, the anniversary of a church's dedication. While some sources claim that the motet was first performed on the dedication day, 29 September 1869, together with the first performance of Bruckner's Mass in E minor, it was actually performed four weeks later, on 29 October, at the same location. Bruckner dedicated the work to Oddo Loidol, one of his students at the Vienna Conservatory. It was Bruckner's first motet composed in Vienna.

The motet, the manuscript of which is put in the collection Dr Wilhelm, Bottmingen, was edited together with three other motets based on graduals (Christus factus est, WAB 11, Os justi, WAB 30, and Virga Jesse, WAB 52) by Theodor Rättig, Vienna in 1886. Locus iste is often performed on the anniversary of a church's dedication. A modern critical edition is available in Band XXI/25 of the Gesamtausgabe.

== Music ==
The motet is scored for an unaccompanied mixed choir. It is in the key of C major and in common time, has 48 bars and takes about three minutes to perform. The text concentrates on the concept of the sacred place, based on the Biblical story of Jacob's Ladder, Jacob's saying "Surely the Lord is in this place; and I knew it not" (Genesis 28:16), and the story of the burning bush where Moses is told "put off thy shoes from off thy feet, for the place whereon thou standest is holy ground" (Exodus 3:5).

Locus iste a Deo factus est,
inaestimabile sacramentum,
irreprehensibilis est.

This place was made by God,
a priceless sacrament;
it is without reproach.

Bruckner structured the three lines of the text in an ABA da capo form, closed by a coda, with A containing the first line, framing the second and third. Peter Strasser suggests that the work reflects elements of architecture, such as in the symmetry of the da capo form and the use of motifs like building blocks.

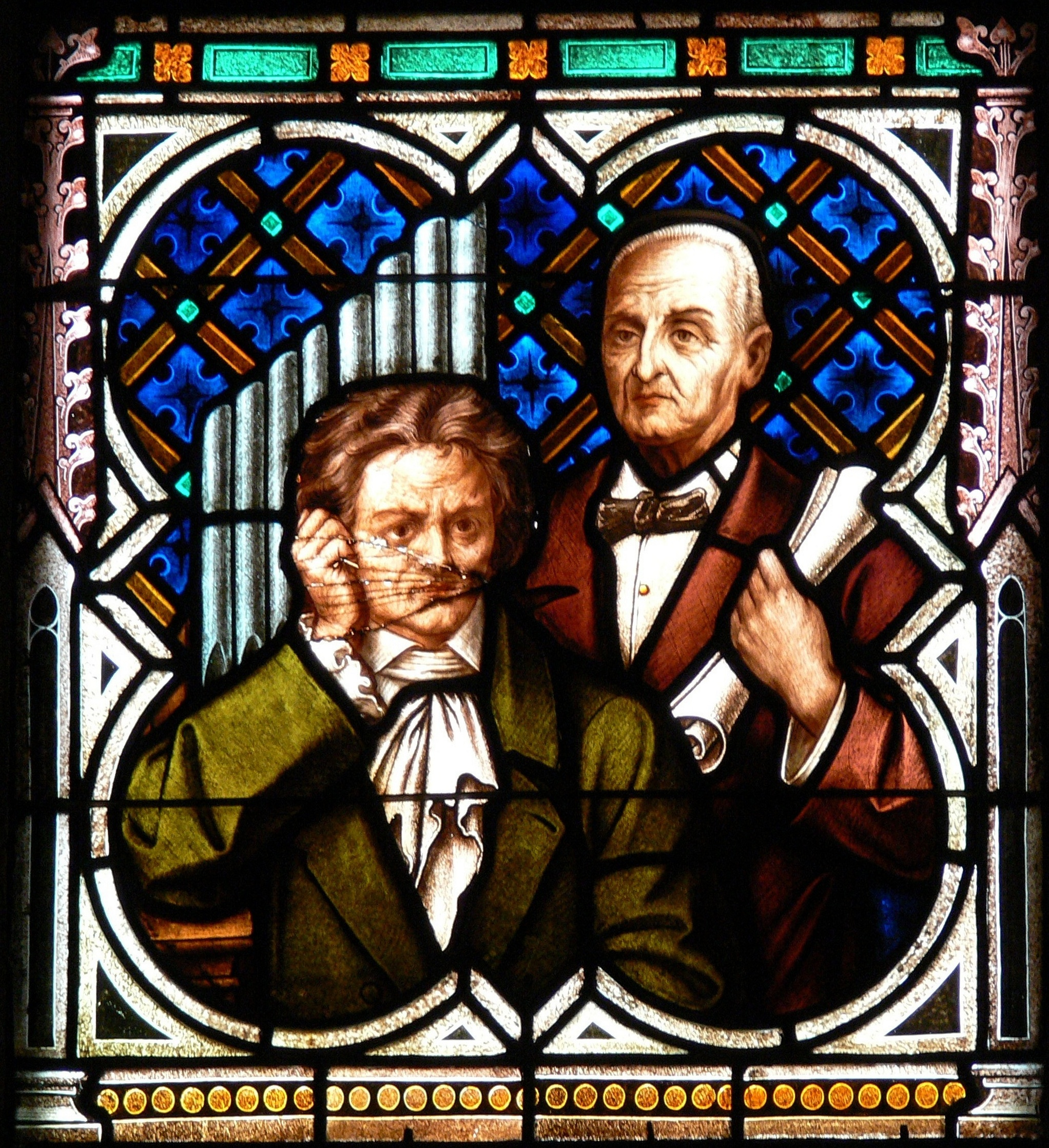
Beethoven and Bruckner commemorated on a stained glass window of the Linz Cathedral

The motet is marked Allegro moderato and begins calmly in homophony. Max Auer notes that the beautiful work has touches with Mozart's Ave verum. A. Crawford Howie notes further that the work "begins with Mozartian phrases, but soon introduces characteristic Brucknerian progressions". The repeat of the first line, beginning one step higher, is marked mf, confirming "a Deo factus est" higher and stronger, then repeating it softly. The bass begins each "a Deo factus est". Musicologist Anthony Carver notes here as in many of Bruckner's motets the "isolation of the bass part at structurally important points". The bass also begins the second line with a new rising motif, marked f; the upper voices follow in homophony. The line is repeated as a sequence a whole tone higher, marked ff. After a pause of half a bar, the tenor alone begins in sudden pp the middle section on a repeated note, imitated by soprano and alto. Throughout the section, only the upper voices, without a bass foundation, sing in chromaticism, beginning in undefined tonality. In a gradual crescendo, the intensity is heightened, but only to mf. Iso Camartin notes in an article dedicated to the work in the Neue Zürcher Zeitung: das unanfechtbare Geheimnis (the irreproachable mystery) appears as unfassbar (incomprehensible) and beunruhigend (disturbing), described by Ryan Turner as "transparently chromatic".

After another rest of half a bar, the first line is repeated. Instead of the last "factus est", the word "Deo" is extended to the only melisma of the otherwise austere, strictly syllabic composition. The author of the program notes for an Oratorio Society of New York CD that includes the motet writes that the melisma "spins an ethereal spell". It leads to a long general pause, achieved "by carefully measuring out five beats", before "a Deo, Deo factus est" is repeated a final time, concluding "peacefully and serenely". The author of the Oratorio Society notes concludes by stating that "Locus iste is a hauntingly beautiful work reminiscent of the quiet chapel it honored". Writing for Gramophone, Malcolm Riley called it "sublime (and deceptively difficult)".

== Recordings ==
The first recording of Bruckner's Locus iste occurred in the beginning of the 20th century:

- Karl Luze, Chor der Kaiserlichen Hofmusikkapelle – 78 rpm gramophone disc G.C./HMV 44762, c. 1907 (no sample of it currently available)

Over 200 recordings of Bruckner's Locus iste include:

- Matthew Best, Corydon Singers, Bruckner: Motets – CD: Hyperion CDA66062, 1982
- Philippe Herreweghe, la Chapelle Royale/Collegium Vocale, Ensemble Musique Oblique, Bruckner: Messe en mi mineur; Motets – CD: Harmonia Mundi France HMC 901322, 1989
- Frieder Bernius, Kammerchor Stuttgart, Bruckner: Mass in E minor; Ave Maria; Christus factus est; Locus iste; Virga Jesse – CD: Sony CL SK 48037, 1991
- John Eliot Gardiner, Monteverdi Choir, Bruckner: Mass No. 1; Motets – CD: DG 459 674–2, 1998
- Dan-Olof Stenlund, Malmö Kammarkör, Bruckner: Ausgewählte Werke – CD: Malmö Kammarkör MKKCD 051, 2004
- Petr Fiala, Tschechischer Philharmonischer Chor Brno, Anton Bruckner: Motets – CD: MDG 322 1422–2, 2006
- Ulf Samuelsson, Ungdomskören OPQ, Under höga valv – CD: Olaus Petri Församling OPCD001, 2006
- Michael Stenov, Cantores Carmeli, Benefizkonzert Karmelitenkirche Linz – CD/DVD issued by the choir, 2006, and on YouTube.
- Stephen Layton, Polyphony Choir, Bruckner: Mass in E minor & Motets – CD: Hyperion CDA 67629, 2007,
- Erwin Ortner, Arnold Schoenberg Chor, Anton Bruckner: Tantum ergo – CD: ASC Edition 3, issue of the choir, 2008
- Otto Kargl, Domkantorei St. Pölten, Bruckner: Messe E-Moll, CD: ORF CD 3174, 2013
- Philipp Ahmann, MDR Rundfunkchor Leipzig, Anton Bruckner & Michael Haydn – Motets – SACD: Pentatone PTC 5186 868, 2021

== Sources ==
- Anton Bruckner – Sämtliche Werke, Band XXI: Kleine Kirchenmusikwerke, Musikwissenschaftlicher Verlag der Internationalen Bruckner-Gesellschaft, Hans Bauernfeind and Leopold Nowak (Editor), Vienna, 1984/2001
- Uwe Harten, Anton Bruckner. Ein Handbuch. Residenz Verlag, Salzburg, 1996. ISBN 3-7017-1030-9
- Cornelis van Zwol, Anton Bruckner 1824–1896 – Leven en werken, uitg. Thoth, Bussum, Netherlands, 2012. ISBN 978-90-6868-590-9
