= Tori Longdon =

British choral conductor

Victoria "Tori" Longdon is a British choral conductor. She is the principal conductor of the Covent Garden Chorus and, since 2024, the associate chorus director of the London Philharmonic Choir. During the COVID-19 pandemic, she co-founded the Stay at Home Choir, later renamed WorldChoir, with Jamie Wright of The Swingles.

== Early life and education ==
Longdon was born in Wilmslow, England. She studied English literature at Durham University, where she directed the chapel choir of St Mary's College for two years, and graduated with first-class honours.

After considering a career in law and working as an assistant speech therapist, she studied choral conducting at the Royal Academy of Music under Patrick Russill. She completed a master's degree in choral conducting with distinction, received the academy's Thomas Armstrong Prize, and was made an Associate of the Royal Academy of Music (ARAM) in 2023.

== Career ==
While studying at the Royal Academy of Music, Longdon directed the Templar Scholars, a professional ensemble she founded, as well as youth choirs in Hertfordshire and High Wycombe. She was also assistant conductor of the London Youth Choir's Choral Scholars and a section leader for the National Youth Choirs of Great Britain. The Templar Scholars, later renamed Consort of Voices, performed for the then Duke and Duchess of Cambridge and the Chinese president Xi Jinping during his state visit to the United Kingdom.

Longdon was a judge on two of Gareth Malone's BBC Two series, The Naked Choir and The Choir: Gareth's Best in Britain. In October 2016, she was appointed the twelfth conductor of the Lea Singers, a chamber choir in Harpenden. By 2019, she was also conducting the Woking Choral Society and Myriad Singers, joining the latter for a season beginning in January 2019.

In 2019, Longdon became one of the first two associate conductors appointed by the Birmingham-based choir Ex Cathedra. She was an adjudicator for the BBC's Songs of Praise Young Choir of the Year competition, and by 2024 was adjudicating its Young Chorister of the Year competition and conducting for the programme. She has taught musicianship at Junior Guildhall, lectured on the Royal Academy of Music's postgraduate Artist Development course, coached voice for the Royal School of Church Music and the Voices Foundation, and written for Classic FM.

In May 2023, she coached eighteen choirs from across the United Kingdom for the Coronation Concert at Windsor Castle. As of 2024, she was an assistant conductor of the National Youth Training Choir.

In 2024, Longdon became an associate chorus director of the London Philharmonic Choir, the second person to hold the post since the choir's founding in 1947, after Matthew Rowe, who served from 2003 to 2008. She also shadowed the choir's outgoing artistic director, Neville Creed. The first concerts for which she prepared the choir were two Doctor Who Proms (Proms 47 and 48) at the Royal Albert Hall on 26 August 2024, performed with the BBC National Orchestra of Wales under Alastair King.

Internationally, Longdon has worked as a vocal coach with the Polish National Youth Choir (Polski Narodowy Chór Młodzieżowy), a project run by the National Forum of Music in Wrocław, the Eton Choral Courses in Shanghai and Shenzhen, the Finlands Svenska Sång Och Musikförbund, the Voices Of Spirit Festival in Austria, the Tanglin Trust in Singapore, and the Australian National Choral Association. In 2025, Longdon joined the jury of the Choir of the World competition at the Llangollen International Musical Eisteddfod. She also chorus-mastered two concerts for the festival and served on the panel that selected composer Sam Buttler to write a new work for the festival's 2026 edition.

In the same year, Longdon also co-founded Forge Conducting with Greg Beardsell, an online training and mentoring programme for choral conductors.

In 2026, Longdon contributed to the Voices of Spirit choral festival in Graz, worked with choirs, music scholars and choral leaders at Tanglin Trust School in Singapore, and led workshops and rehearsal sessions in Australia.

== WorldChoir ==
In March 2020, Longdon co-founded the Stay at Home Choir with Jamie Wright. In November 2020, the Stay at Home Choir was one of six winners of the Royal Philharmonic Society's newly introduced Inspiration Award, which recognised music-making during lockdown. By late 2020, its guest artists had included James MacMillan, Karl Jenkins, The Sixteen, Voces8, The King's Singers and The Swingles.

By early 2021, Stay at Home Choir had worked with John Rutter and with Marin Alsop and the Vienna Radio Symphony Orchestra. In 2021, Gareth Malone composed a setting of Locus iste for the choir’s virtual singers.

Singers from the choir appear on two movements of Jenkins's album One World, released by Decca in 2023, and several hundred members joined a performance of the work at the Brucknerhaus in Linz on both stage and via screen. The choir was later renamed WorldChoir.

== Personal life ==
Longdon married Jack Merrylees in 2023, and the couple live in Gloucestershire.
