= Häusling (Erlangen) =

Village in Middle Franconia, Bavaria

- Village of Erlangen
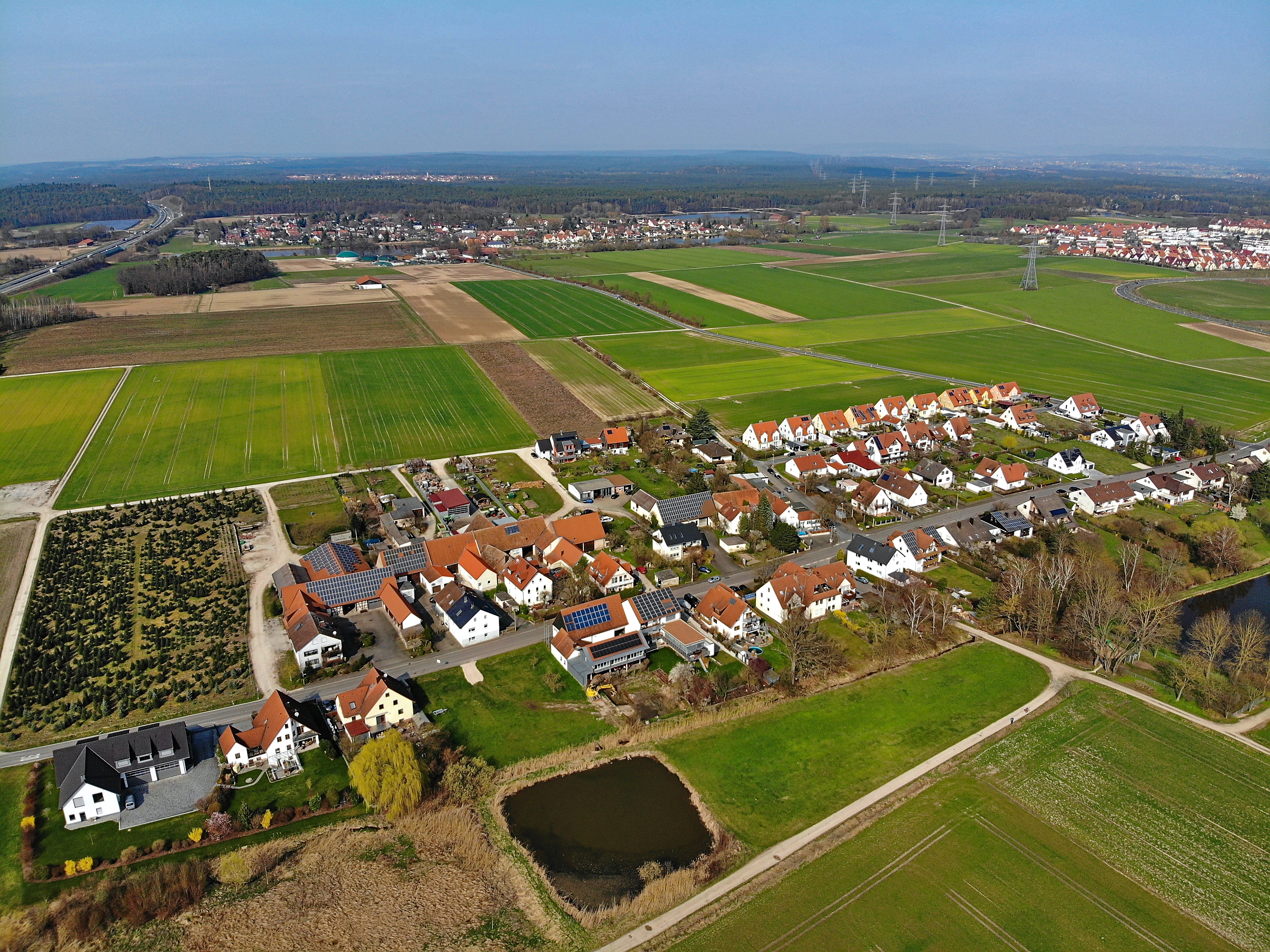
- Aerial view
- Interactive map of Häusling
- Location within Germany Location within Bavaria
- Coordinates: 49°35′20″N 10°56′0″E
- Country: Germany
- State: Bavaria
- Admin. region: Middle Franconia
- City: Erlangen
- Elevation: 300 m (980 ft)

Population (2020-12-31)
  - Total: 203
- Time zone: UTC+01:00 (CET)
  - Summer (DST): UTC+02:00 (CEST)
- Postal codes: 91056
- Dialling codes: 09131
- Vehicle registration: ER

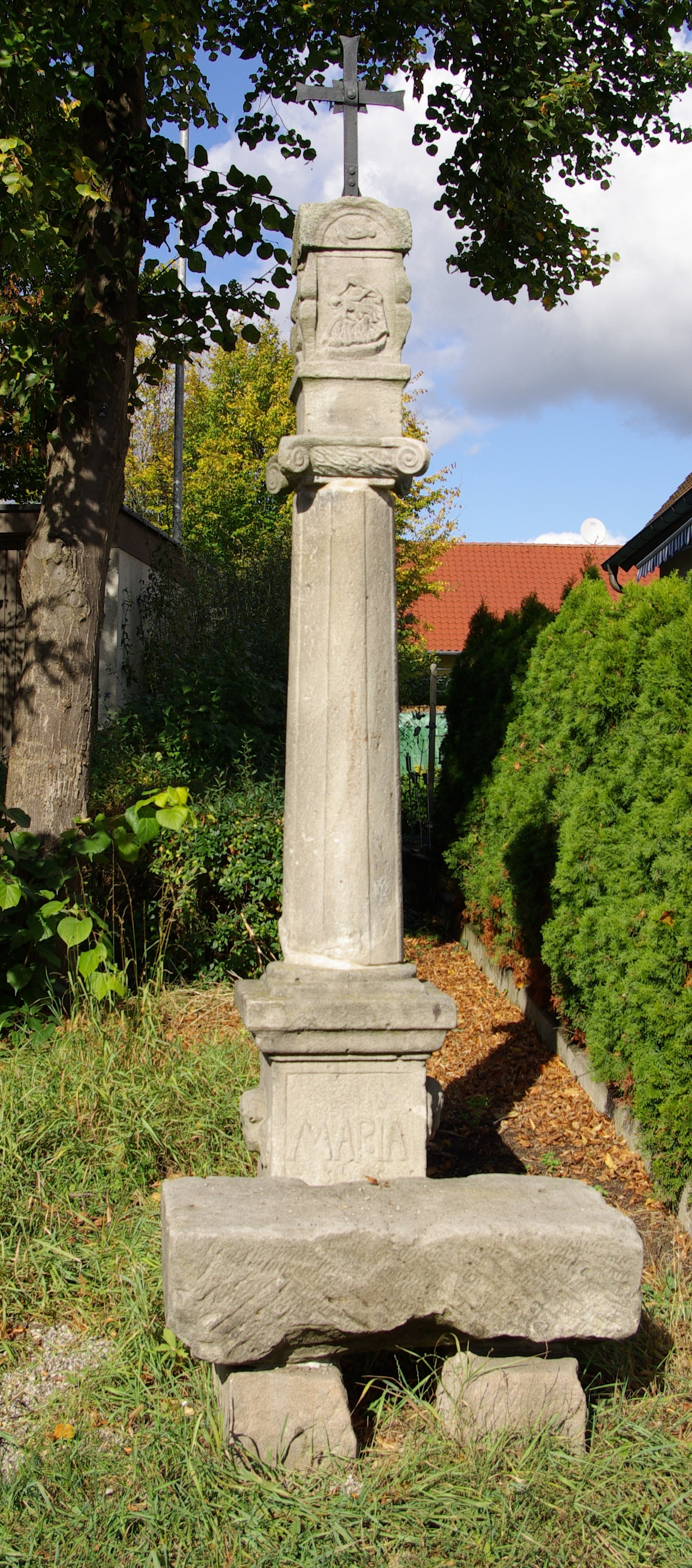
Bildstock in Häusling

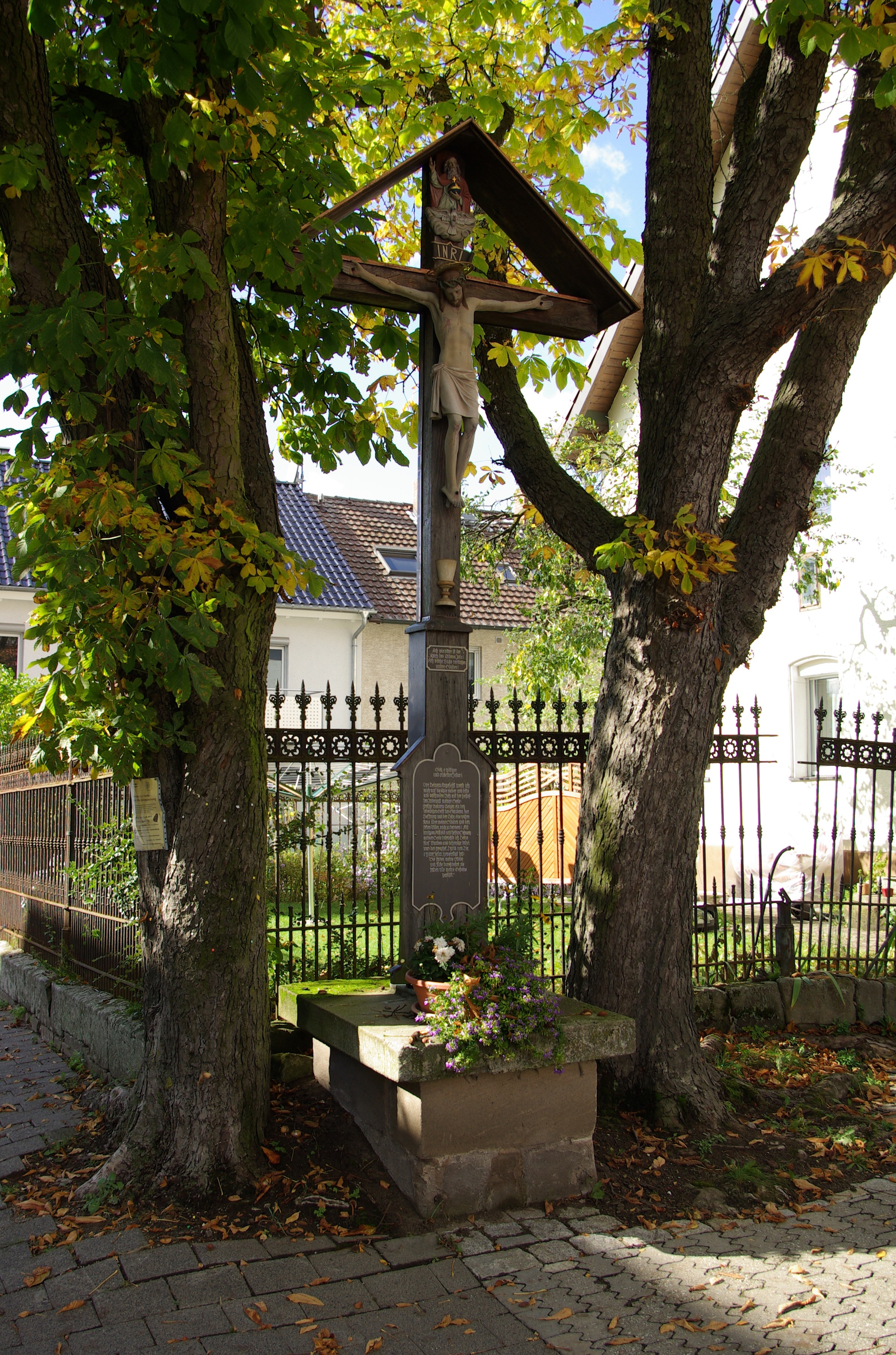
Wayside cross in Häusling

Häusling is a village in the city of Erlangen (Middle Franconia, Bavaria). Its resident population was 203 in 2020.

== Geography ==
The village lies next to the stream Bimbach, which feeds a chain of ponds, e.g. the Doktorsweiher, and flows into the Regnitz in the Erlangen district of Neumühle as a left tributary. The place is surrounded by fields and grassland. The field in the south is called Trutenäcker, the one in the north Am Schleifweg. The Kreisstraße ER 1/ERH 25 runs to Haundorf (1 km to the west) or to Büchenbach (1.5 km to the north-east). A country lane runs to Kosbach (1.3 km north) and to Steudach (1.4 km south).

== History ==
The locality was first mentioned in 1400 as "Heuslans". The place name is based on the Middle High German word hūselin (little house). The overlord was the Prince-Bishopric of Bamberg. The Nuremberg patrician Leupold Schürstab received the bailiwick over four farms. In an interest booklet of the Schürstabs from 1407, five goods in "Hewsleins" were listed that were subject to tax. The Dompropsteiamt Büchenbach, the seat of the Dompropst in the adjacent district, was listed as the owner. In 1468 the village consisted of 5 properties with a total of 3 1/2 Huben fields. In 1580 the Schürstabs continued to be the lords of the 5 estates. However, at least temporarily, the income from two farms went to the Nuremberg State Alms Office, as a document from 1540 shows. As a result of the Thirty Years' War, the town was destroyed in 1632. It was not until 1670 that buyers were found for the five farms. The lordship of the property now belonged to the Dompropsteiamt Büchenbach.

Towards the end of the 18th century there were 8 estates in Häusling. The high court fulfilled the duties of the Bamberg Dompropsteiamt Büchenbach to a limited extent.

In 1810, Häusling came into the hands of the Kingdom of Bavaria. As part of the community edict by Maximilian I Joseph, it was assigned to the tax district of Büchenbach, formed in 1811, and to the rural community of Kosbach, formed in 1818.

On January 1, 1967, Häusling was incorporated into Erlangen as part of the municipality of Kosbach. Until the 1970s, the place was entirely determined by agriculture. In the period that followed, a new settlement was built next to the old town. In 2000 only three farmers remained in the village.

=== Local landmarks ===
- Haundorfer Str. 34: Iron fence and wayside cross
- Haundorfer Straße: Säulenbildstock (Historic columned religious art piece)

Year	1818	1861	1871	1885	1900	1925	1950	1961	1970	1987	2000
Population	46	63	60	54	65	52	79	62	73	133	179
Houses	9			10	11	10	10	12		32
Source

== Religion ==
The village was purely Catholic until the middle of the 20th century and is still parochial to St. Xystus (Büchenbach). The Protestants were originally parishioners of the Dreifaltigkeitskirche (Erlangen), but are now parishioners of the Martin-Luther-Kirche (Büchenbach).
