= Þorlákshöfn =

- Town
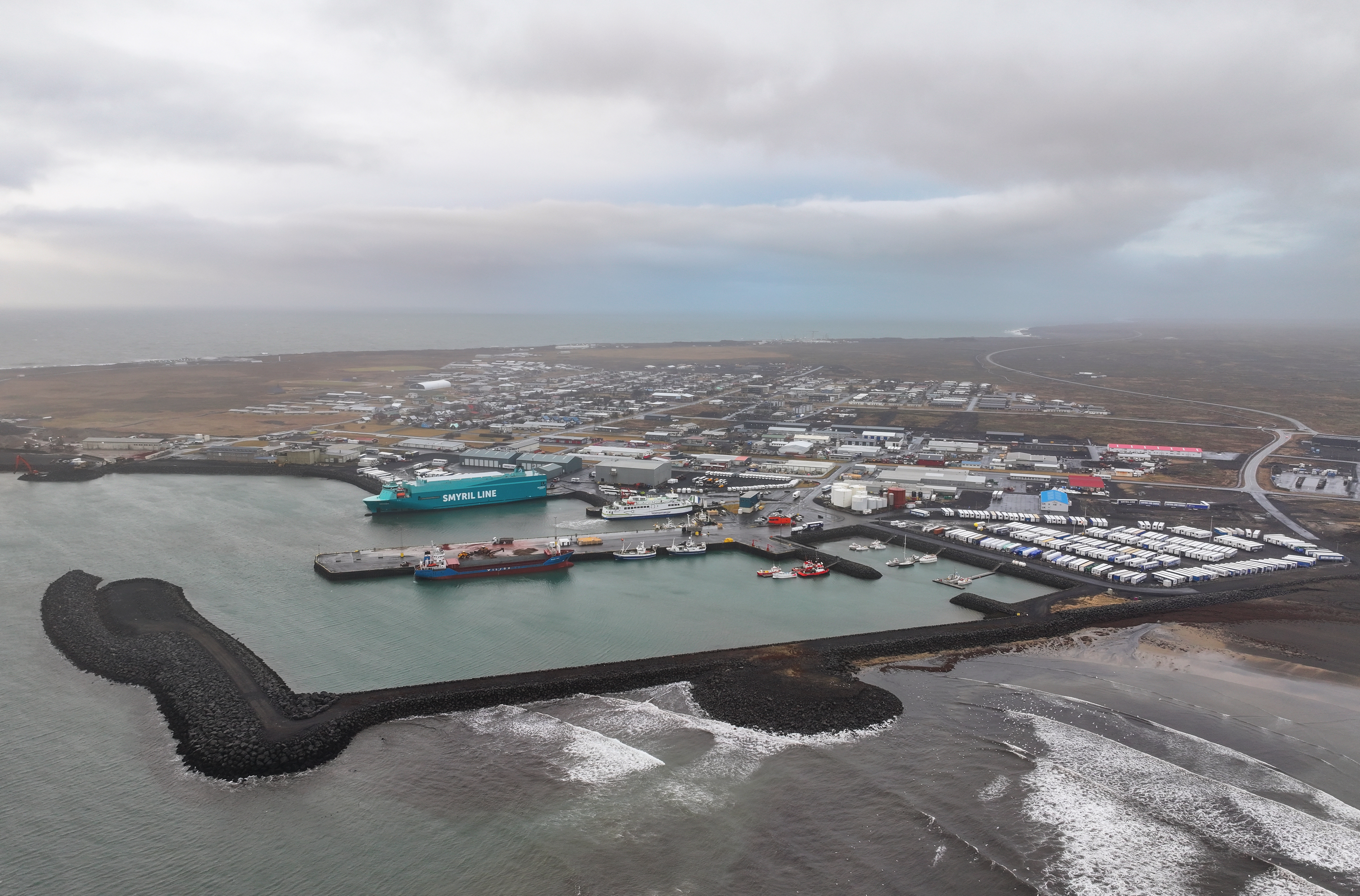
- Aerial view of Þorlákshöfn
- Nickname: Höfnin
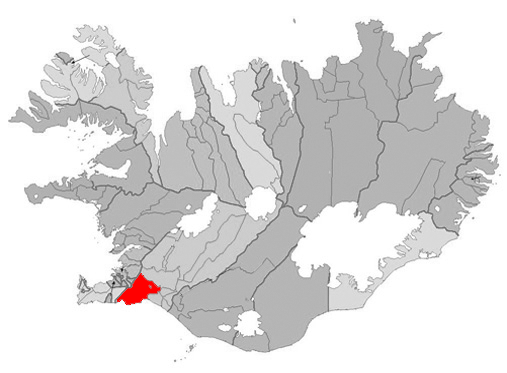
- Location of the Municipality of Ölfus

- Location in Iceland
- Coordinates: 63°51′N 21°22′W
- Country: Iceland
- Constituency: South Constituency
- Region: Southern Region
- Municipality: Ölfus

Government
  - Mayor: Elliði Vignisson

Population (2024)
  - Total: 2,037
- Time zone: UTC+0 (GMT)
- Post Code: 815
- Website: www.olfus.is

Þorlákshöfn (Icelandic pronunciation: [ˈθɔrˌlauksˌhœpn̥], lit. 'Thorlak's Harbour') is a town on the southern coast of Iceland in the Municipality of Ölfus.

The town is named after Saint Thorlak who was a bishop at Skálholt. Its main importance is as a port as it has the only harbour on Iceland's southern coastline between Grindavík in the west and Höfn in the east. The port serves direct weekly cargo ferries to Rotterdam and Hirtshals operated by Faroese Smyril Line. It is also one of two departure points for ferries to the Vestmannaeyjar archipelago. Services include restaurants, tourism, a golf course, motocross field, camping, a sports complex, and a swimming pool. The town has several fish processing enterprises (Hafnarnes, Lysi). Several salmon farms (Arnarlax, GeoSalmo, Landeldi, LaxEldi), among the biggest in the country, are west of town.

== History and culture ==
The construction of Þorlákskirkja, a modern Protestant church, was started in 1979. The church was consecrated in 1985. There are various historical places near Þorlákshöfn, e.g., a wooden church dating from 1909 on the farm Kotströnd.

== Infrastructure ==
Þorlákshöfn has a hotel, a camping area, a golf course, various restaurants, and a sports centre with a public swimming pool. The town hall of the municipality of Ölfus (Ráðhús Ölfuss) is in Þorlákshöfn. There are various shops, a supermarket, primary school, kindergarten, public library, health care centre (Heilsugaelustöð), pharmacy, a gas station and several car repair shops.

== Sports ==
As of 2023, local football club Ægir plays in the second tier of Iceland's football pyramid. They play their home games at the Þorlákshafnarvöllur.

== Tourist attractions ==
In the vicinity of the town, one finds several tourist attractions and sightseeing spots:

- The Black Sand Beaches of Hafnarskeid, east of town
- Basaltic seacliffs and cliff arches, west of town
- The Lava Tunnel of Raufarhólshellir (1,5 km)
- Arnarker Lava Tube (0,5 km)
- Stori Meitill Crater (one of the biggest in the southwest of Iceland)
- Hnúkar Volcanic Dwarf Cones of Selvogsheidi shield volcano
- Geitafell Table Mountain (local landmark as it is visible in the background of the town)
- The peak of Litli Meitill with Votaberg tectonic wall-cliff on its slopes

== Notable people from Þorlákshöfn ==
- Bergþóra Árnadóttir Folk Singer
- Birgitta Jónsdóttir Politician, Poet and Activist
- Jón Guðni Fjóluson: Footballer currently playing for IFK Norrköping
- Jónas Sigurðsson: (Jónas Sig) musician
