= Ölfus =

Sveitarfélagið Ölfus
- Municipality
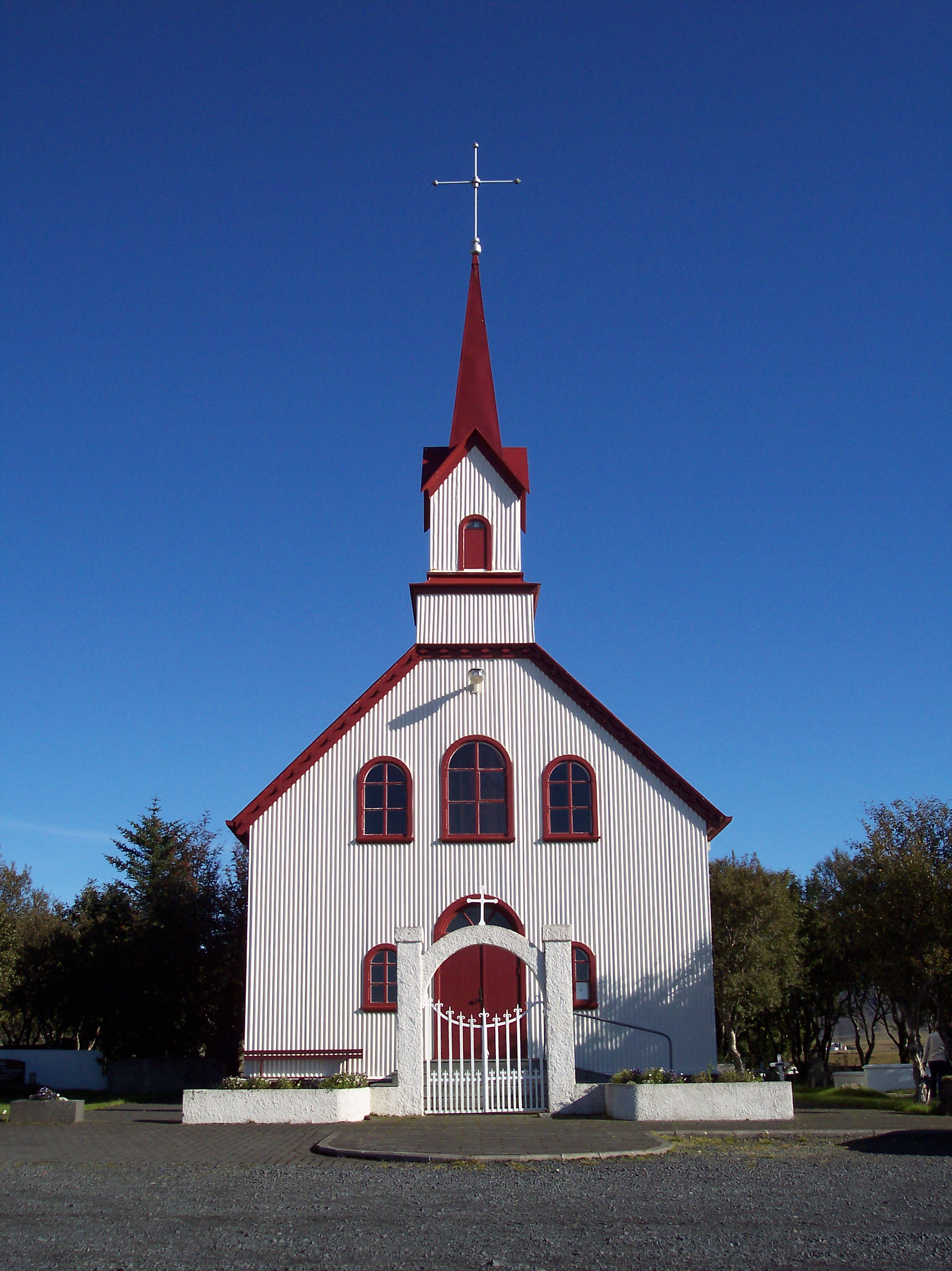
- Wooden church Kotstrandarkirkja

- Location of the municipality

- Location within Iceland
- Country: Iceland
- Region: Southern Region
- Constituency: South Constituency

Government
  - Mayor: Elliði Vignisson

Area
  - Total: 737 km^{2} (285 sq mi)

Population
  - Total: 1,906
  - Density: 2.59/km^{2} (6.7/sq mi)
- Postal code(s): 815, 816
- Municipal number: 8717
- Website: olfus.is

Ölfus (Icelandic pronunciation: [ˈœlvʏs]) is a municipality located in Iceland. The major town is called Þorlákshöfn. The bottled water brand Icelandic Glacial is manufactured in this area, at the Ölfus spring.

== Geography ==
In Ölfus, several lava tubes can be visited. Raufarhólshellir [ˈrœyːvarˌhoulsˌhɛtlɪr̥] is one of the longest lava tubes in Iceland with a length of 1,360 metres and a height of up to 10 metres. One of the most famous caves is Búri (cave). Another local cave is Arnarker [ˈa(r)tnarˌcʰɛːr̥] with a length of 516 metres. Leitarhraun [ˈleiːtar̥ˌr̥œyːn] is a lava field which is about 5000 years old in the northwest of the municipality. Lake Hlíðarvatn [ˈl̥iːðarˌvahtn̥] covering an area of 3,3 km^{2} is a lake with a depth of up to 5 metres which is known for its birdlife. In Reykjadalur [ˈreiːcaˌtaːlʏr̥] valley several hot wells and springs are visited for bathing. Árnarhellir [ˈau(r)tnarˌhɛtlɪr̥] is a stalactite cave near Þorlákshöfn.

Earthquakes caused some damage in Ölfus in 1706 and 1896.

== Culture and sights ==
One of the most famous buildings in Ölfus is Strandarkirkja, a wooden church built in 1888 and renovated in 1968 and 1996 which has been mentioned in many old documents and stories. Its retable was painted in 1865 by Sigurður Guðmundsson (1833–1874), the Icelandic painter, and the pulpit as well as the altar date from 1888. Selvogsviti [ˈsɛlˌvɔksˌvɪːtɪ] is a lighthouse at Selvogur Bay measuring 20 metres in height which was built in 1991. Close to the bay Fornigarður [ˈfɔ(r)tnɪˌkarðʏr̥] can be seen, an old wall measuring seven kilometres in length which in 1275 was mentioned in a document for the first time. Sometimes it is called Langigarður [ˈlauɲcɪˌkarðʏr̥] or Strandargarður [ˈstrantarˌkarðʏr̥] as well. Originally its height amounted to 1.66 metres and its broadth to 0.96 centimetres, but due to erosion the wall has become lower and thinner. Under its basis ash was found from a volcanic eruption of Hekla which took place in 1104. This could mean that the wall was built after 1104.

Hjallakirkja [ˈçatlaˌcʰɪr̥ca] is a Protestant church in the community of Hjalli [ˈçatlɪ] which was built in 1928. It houses various pieces of art, e.g. a pulpit dating from 1797 erbaut and a retable representing the resurrection of Christ. Legend has it that the church was founded immediately after the introduction of Christianity in 1000, and according to Flóamanna saga the church was built by a settler called Skaftur Þóroddsson.

Kotstrandarkirkja [ˈkʰɔtˌstrantarˌcʰɪr̥ca] is a comparatively large wooden church dating from 1909 with a well-kept garden in the community Kotströnd [ˈkʰɔtˌstrœnt]. Originally it served as a parish church for the neighbouring town of Hveragerði as well until Hveragerði got its own church. The church is known for its bells dating from 1644 and for its retable painted by Örlygur Sigurðsson in 1878 which represents Jesus together with St. Peter, John and Jacob. Kotströnd is a small community on highway no. 1. (Hringvegur) in the northeast of Ölfus.

Kögunarhóll is a hill measuring 61 metres in height close the main road no. 1 in the northeast of Ölfus which offers views of the area. As many traffic accidents happen there a memorial consisting of 52 crosses was erected in 2006 to remind on the victims.

== Infrastructure ==
Þorlákshöfn has a hotel, a camping area, a golf course, various restaurants and a sports centre with a public swimming pool. The townhall of the municipality of Ölfus (Ráðhús Ölfuss) is in Þorlákshöfn. There are various shops, a supermarket, primary school, kindergarten, public library, health care centre (Heilsugaelustöð), pharmacy, a gas station and repairing station as well.

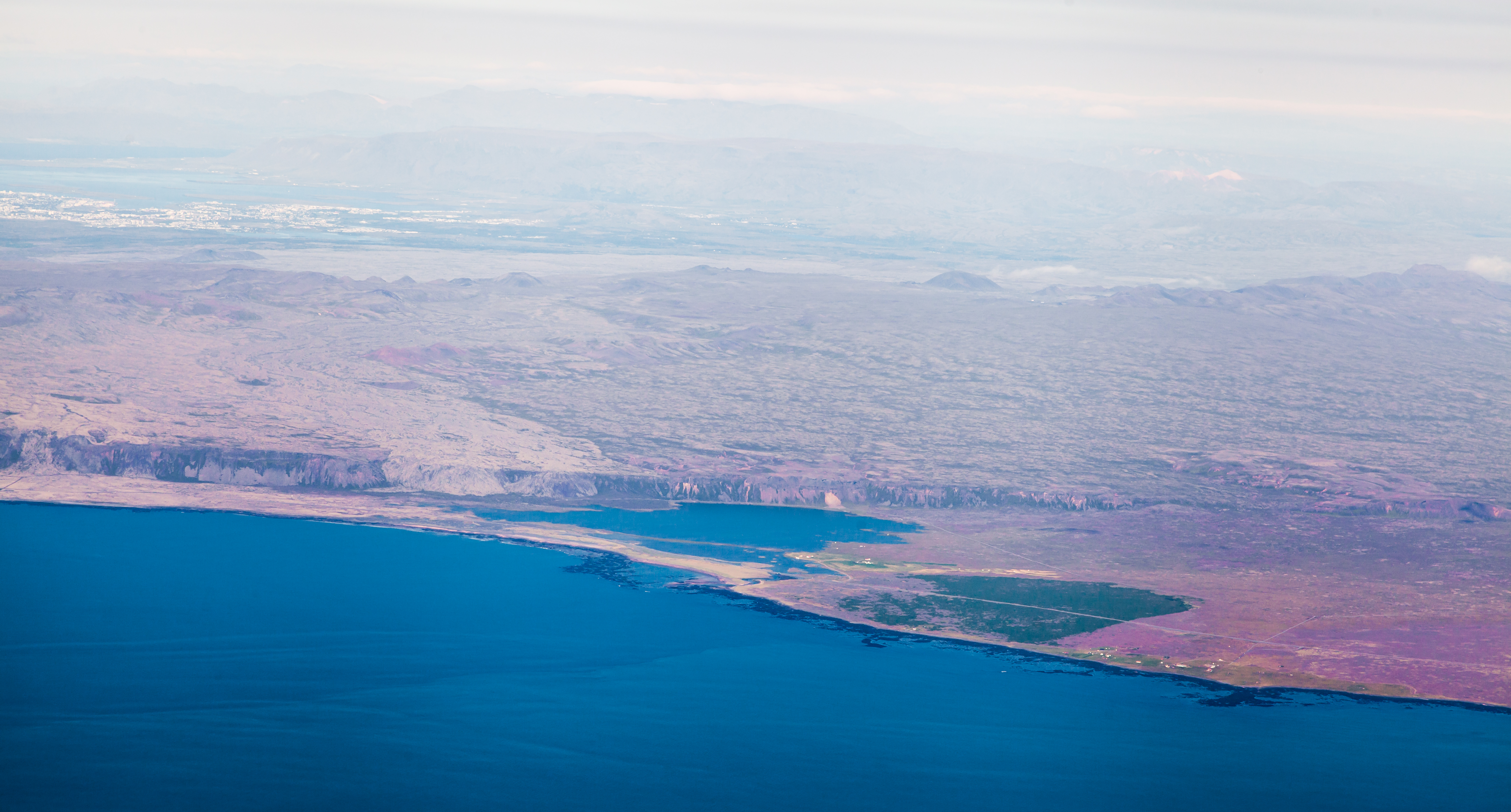
Aerial view of Ölfus with Reykjavík in the background

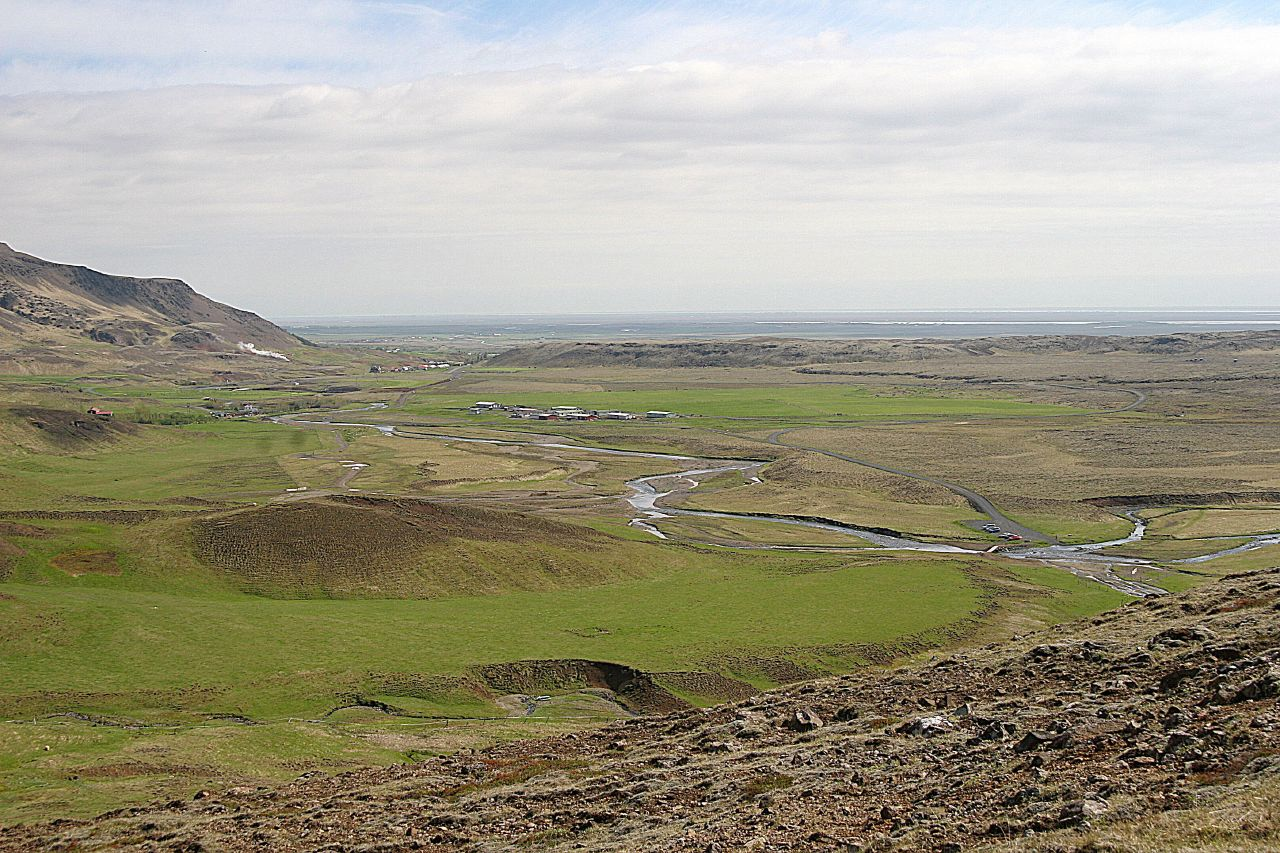
Typical landscape in Ölfus

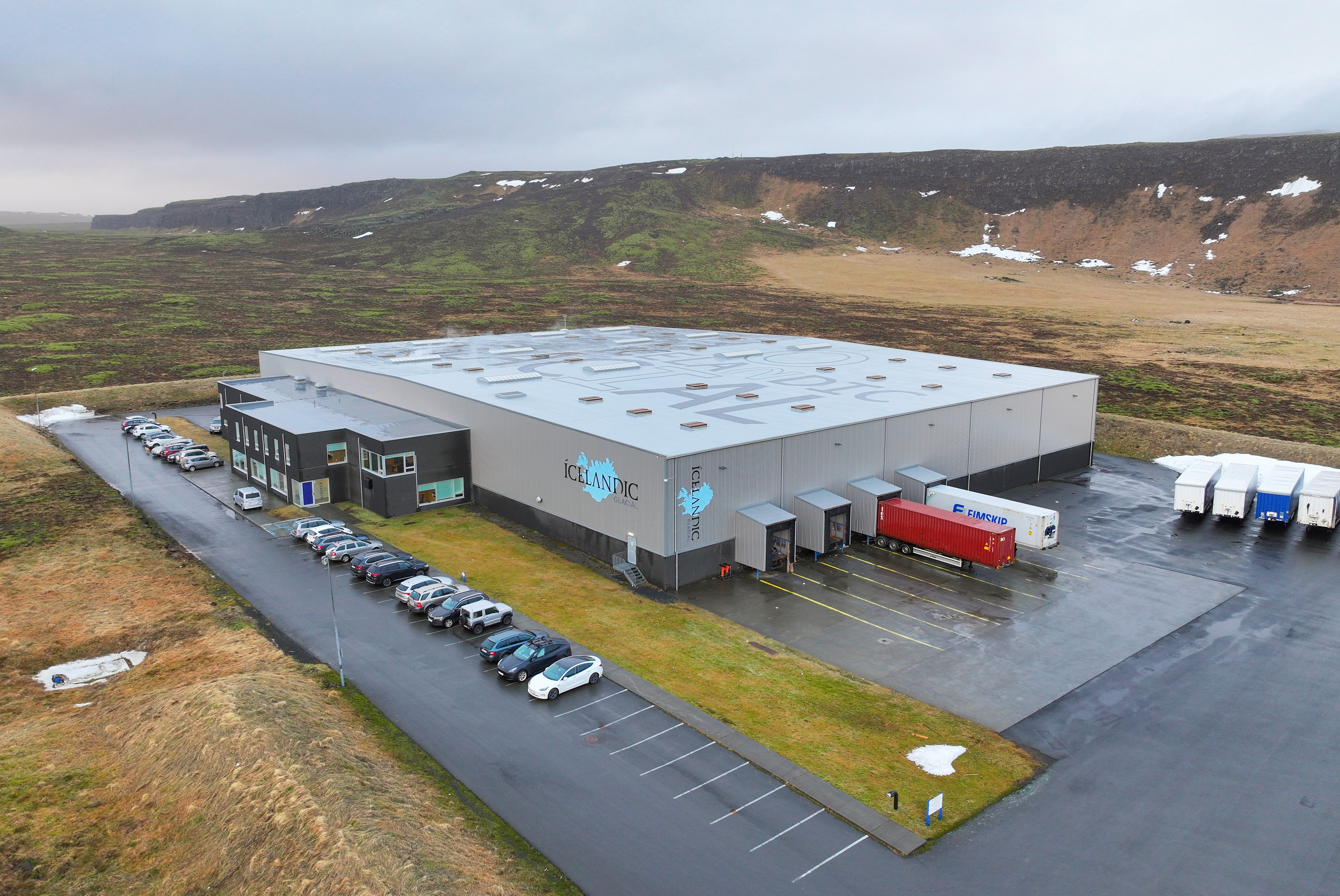
Icelandic Glacial bottled water factory

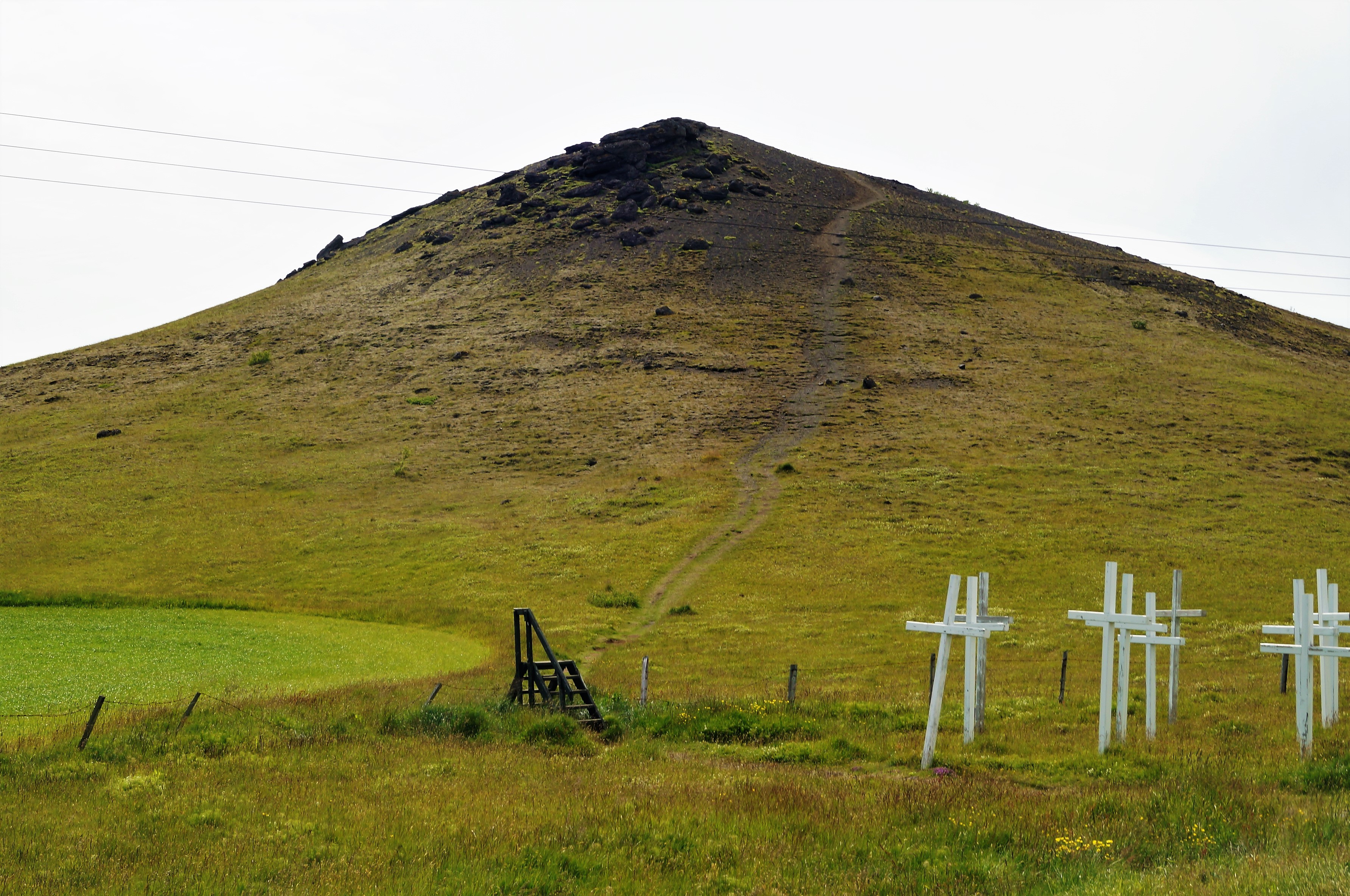
Memorial in front of Kögunarhóll

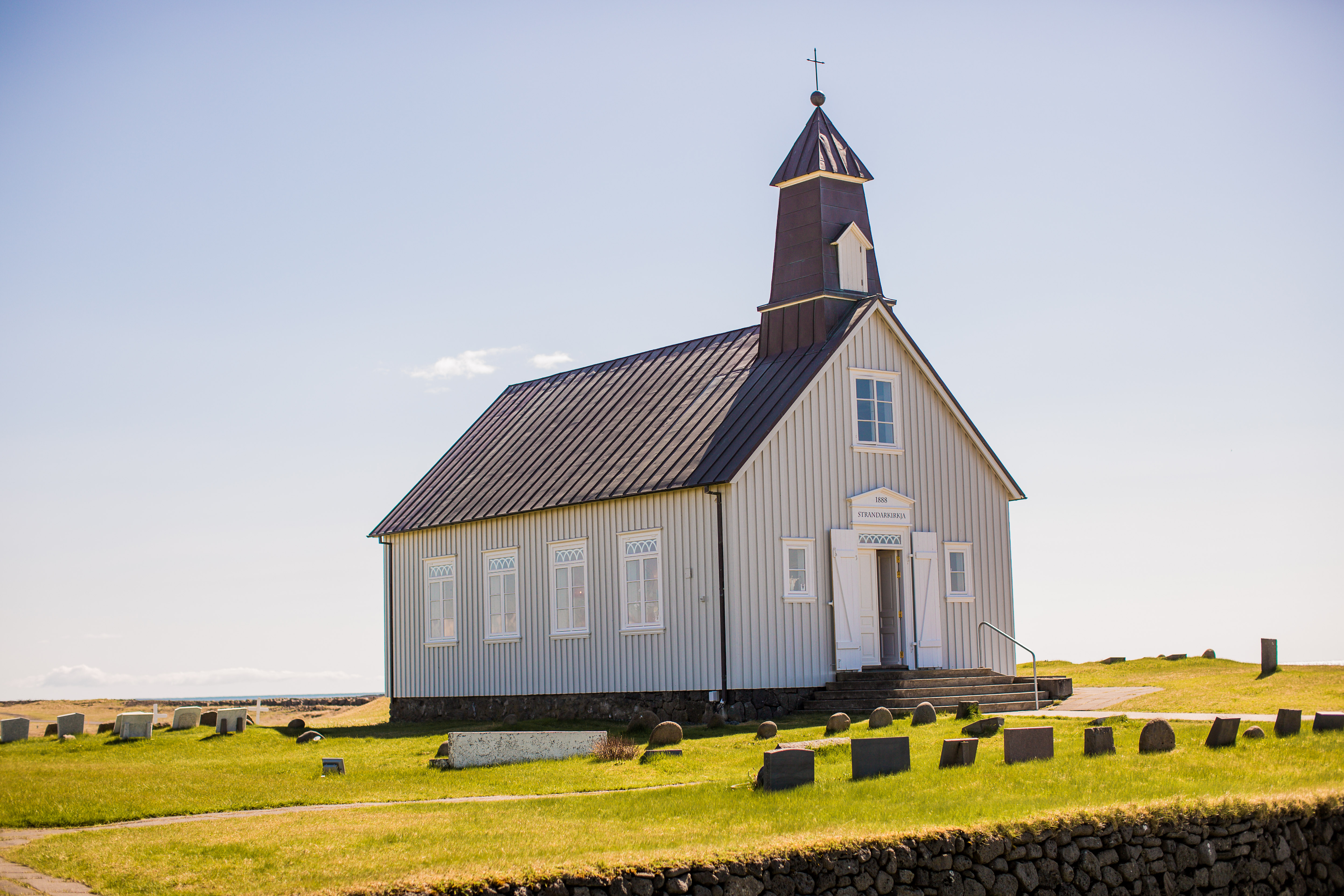
Strandarkirkja

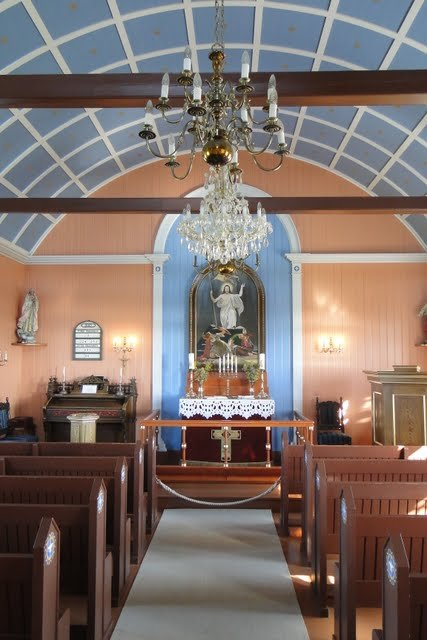
Strandarkirkja
