= Votive church =

Kind of church building

A votive church (votive from the Latin votum 'vowed sacrifice, vows') is a church that was built as a votive offering, either as a sign of thanksgiving for salvation from an emergency or with a request for the fulfillment of a specific desire, (and sometimes known as "thanksgiving churches"(de), or as an act of expiation, or atonement (also known as an "expiatory chapel"). Often, the builder has previously made a vow to have the church built in the case of the prayer heard (or taken over the construction costs).

== Chapels of thanksgiving ==
- Votive Chapel, Nattenhausen (de); chapel of thanksgiving, built around 1900
- Votive Church, Passau (de); consecrated in honour of the proclamation of the Immaculate Conception in 1854
- Votive Church, Szeged; thanksgiving after a flood in 1879
- Votivkirche, Vienna; thanksgiving for preserving the life of Emperor Franz Joseph in 1853
- Basilica of Notre-Dame-des-Victoires, Paris; thanksgiving for victory over Protestants in 1628
- Santa Maria della Salute, Venice; thanksgiving after an outbreak of plague in 1630
- Estrela Basilica, Lisbon; thanksgiving for the birth of a child to Queen Maria I in 1761
- Trinity Church, Munich; thanksgiving for protection from the Austrians during the War of the Spanish Succession
- Il Redentore, Venice; thanksgiving after an outbreak of plague in 1592
- Strandarkirkja, Selvogur, Iceland; thanksgiving for the saving of a group of sailors in the 12th century
- Notre-Dame de Fourvière, Lyon; Dedicated to the Virgin Mary, to whom is attributed the salvation of the city from the bubonic plague in 1643.
- San Giorgio, Siena; dedicated to San Giorgio in thanksgiving for the victory achieved by the Sienese in the battle of Montaperti.
- Monastery of Batalha, Portugal; Built to thank the Virgin Mary for the Portuguese victory over the Castilians in the Battle of Aljubarrota in 1385.

== Expiatory chapels ==
- Chapelle expiatoire, Paris; atonement for the execution of Marie Antoinette, built 1816
- Sagrada Família, Barcelona, founded in 1882 in response to a growing rejection of the Catholic church and its values
- Sacré-Cœur, Paris, atonement for the moral decline of the country since the French Revolution.
