= Þorlákshafnarprestkall =

Lutheran parish in Árnessýsla,southern Iceland

Þorlákshafnarprestkall is a Lutheran (Church of Iceland) parish in southern Iceland, located within Árnessýsla. It is part of the Suðurprófastsdæmi (Southern Federation of Parishes).

Þorlákshafnarprestkall administrates three parish churches: Þorlákskirkja, Hjallakirkja, and Strandarkirkja, the latter two having been absorbed into the parish due to the lack of population within them.
