= Kosbach =

Coordinates: 49°36′N 10°56′E

Kosbach is a village on the outskirts of Erlangen, Germany. The village is known locally for its own Kirchweih festival, the Kosbacher Karpfen Kirchweih, which is a fest or celebration at which carp is consumed en masse. The village is surrounded by carp ponds. The ponds are lined with nets, a month or so before the festival the nets are raised so the fish are off the bottom and the muddiness is rinsed away. In 1985 there were a disproportionate number of teenagers in the town, by far outnumbering the adults.

On 1 January 1967, the municipality of Kosbach was incorporated into Erlangen. Since then the population of Kosbach increased significantly to almost 1000 inhabitants in 2023.
