= Búri (cave) =

Lava tube in Iceland

Coordinates: 63°54′50″N 21°29′4″W

The Búri (Icelandic pronunciation: [ˈpuːrɪ]) cave is a lava tube located in southwestern Iceland and was discovered in 1992, by the volcanologist Guðmundur Þorsteinsson.

The cave was closed in 2014 by the owners of the land in cooperation with the Icelandic Speleological Society.

== Location ==
The cave is located near Þorlákshöfn on the Reykjanesskagi peninsula, around 28 miles southeast of Reykjavík.

== Formation ==
The cave is located in the Leitahraun [ˈleiːtaˌr̥œyːn] lava field. It was created by a subterranean lava flow, where the wall of the cave cooled quicker than the lava itself, which drained away. The largest point measures 32 feet (9.8 m) in height and width. At the end of the 0.65-mile (1.05 km) cave system, there is a 56-foot-deep (17 m) lava fall into the place where the lava escaped.

The entrance to the cave is located on the southern slope and partly covered with rocks. Wearing a helmet is highly recommended. Local tourist organizations offer guided trips into the cave.
