= Icelandic Glacial =

Icelandic bottled water brand

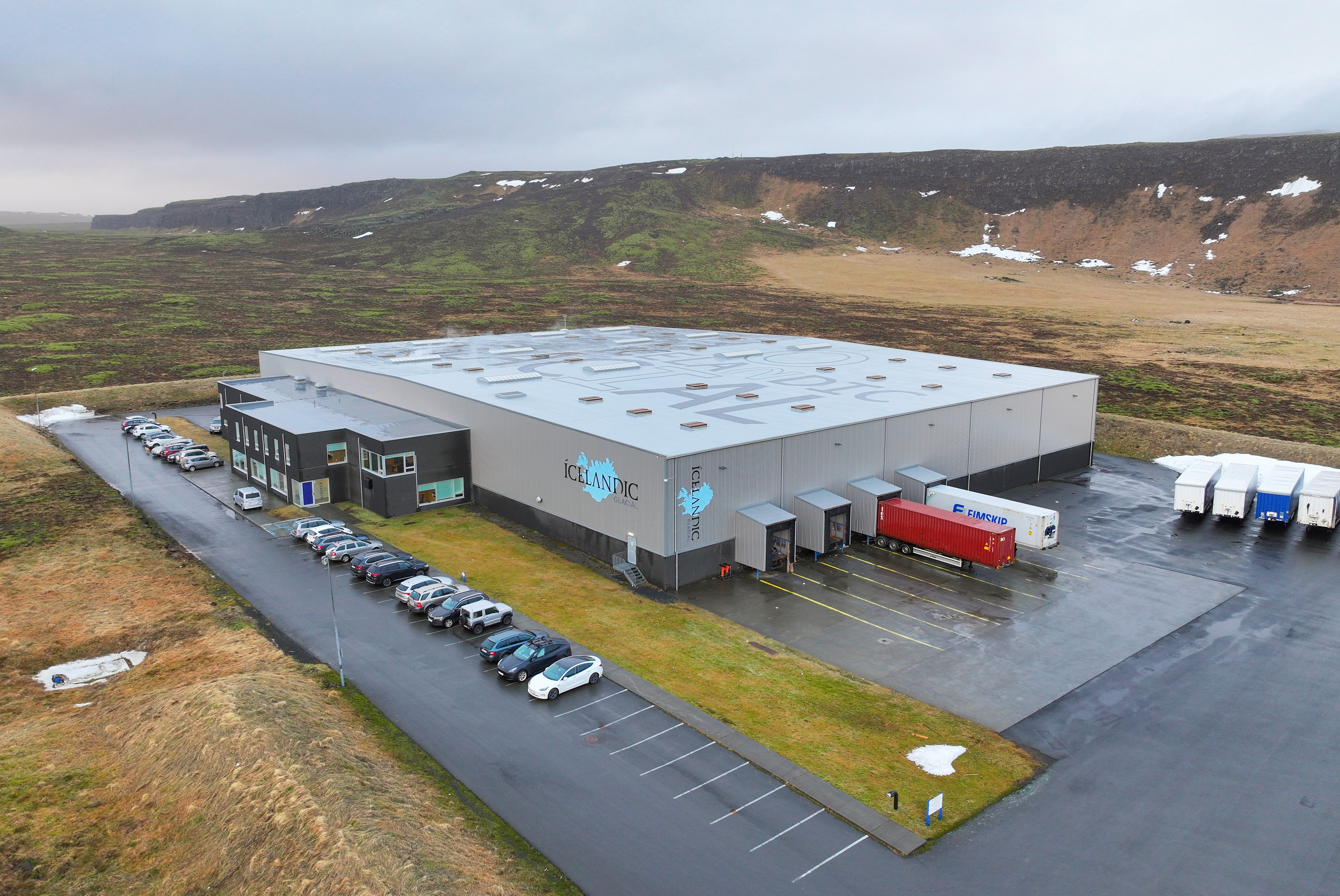
- Icelandic Glacial bottling plant in Ölfus
- Type: Private
- Industry: Bottled water
- Founded: 2004
- Founder: Jón Ólafsson
- Headquarters: Hlidarendi, Ölfus, Iceland
- Area served: Worldwide (20+ countries)
- Products: Natural spring water, sparkling spring water, aluminum can water, glass-bottled water
- Owner: Icelandic Water Holdings ehf
- Website: icelandicglacial.com

Icelandic Glacial (stylized as ÍCELANDIC GLACIAL®) is an Icelandic bottled water brand sourced from the Ölfus Spring in southwestern Iceland. The water is bottled at a geothermally-powered facility located adjacent to the spring in Hlidarendi, Ölfus. It is distributed in more than 20 countries.

== History ==
Icelandic Glacial was founded in 2004 by Icelandic entrepreneur Jón Ólafsson. The company began exporting its product internationally in 2005. In July 2007, Anheuser-Busch InBev acquired a 20% ownership stake in the company and became the exclusive U.S. distributor. By 2011, following a $40 million equity funding round, Anheuser-Busch InBev had converted its debt and raised its ownership stake to 23.3%.

In 2007, Icelandic Glacial was named Best Water of 2007 in the BevNET Awards, recognizing it as the first U.S.-distributed certified carbon-neutral bottled water.

In September 2008, the company opened a new bottling facility in Hlidarendi, Ölfus, powered entirely by natural green energy sources including geothermal and hydroelectric power.

== Source ==
The water is sourced from the Ölfus Spring, located in the municipality of Ölfus in southwestern Iceland. The spring was formed following a volcanic eruption more than 5,000 years ago and is replenished by rainfall and snowmelt that filters through layers of lava rock. The spring produces approximately 900,000 cubic meters of water daily; the bottling operation draws approximately 0.1% of the spring's overflow.

The spring is located within a 128,000-acre protected lava field that shields it from surface-level contamination. The water has a naturally alkaline pH of 8.4 and a low total dissolved solids (TDS) level of 72 ppm.

Icelandic Glacial is certified as a Natural Mineral Water under both European Union and Great Britain standards, a designation requiring microbiological purity, consistent mineral content, and no artificial treatment.

== Certifications ==
Icelandic Glacial holds several independent third-party certifications:

- CarbonNeutral® (product and operations) – Icelandic Glacial is the world's first bottled water to receive CarbonNeutral® certification for both its product and its manufacturing operations, a distinction it has held since 2007 under certification by The CarbonNeutral Company. The bottling facility is powered entirely by geothermal and hydroelectric energy.
- NSF International (PFAS-free and microplastic-free) – As of 2025, Icelandic Glacial products are certified by NSF International as free of PFAS (per- and polyfluoroalkyl substances) and microplastics.
- Superior Taste Award – Icelandic Glacial received the top award at the Superior Taste Awards, an international food and beverage quality assessment program organized by the International Taste Institute in Brussels.

== Notable partnerships and events ==
=== Flint water crisis (2016) ===
In January 2016, singer Cher announced a partnership with Icelandic Glacial to donate 181,440 bottles of water to residents of Flint, Michigan during the Flint water crisis.

=== The Rolling Stones (2016–2017) ===
In March 2016, Icelandic Glacial served as the official water at the Rolling Stones' free concert in Havana, Cuba — reportedly the first time a non-Cuban water product was imported into the country for a public event. In August 2017, Icelandic Glacial was named the official water of the Rolling Stones' No Filter Tour across Europe, providing water to the band and crew at fourteen performances in nine countries.

== Global availability ==
Icelandic Glacial is available in over 20 countries, including the United States, Canada, the United Kingdom, France, Australia, South Korea, and China. It is served aboard Icelandair flights.

== Products ==
Icelandic Glacial is available in the following formats:

- Still water (PET bottles, glass bottles, cans)
- Sparkling water (glass bottles, cans)
- Flavored sparkling water (cans)

== See also ==
- Bottled water
- Natural mineral water
- Ölfus
- Carbon neutrality
