= Malcolm Riley =

British composer

- Born: 9 June 1960 (age 65); Northallerton, North Riding of Yorkshire, England
- Education: Christ's College, Cambridge
- Occupations: Composer, educator, author

Malcolm Riley (born 9 June 1960) is a British composer and author most associated for his work as a scholar of the work of Percy Whitlock.

== Early life and education ==
Riley was born in Northallerton, North Riding of Yorkshire, England. Educated at Harrogate High School, he gained an organ scholarship to Christ's College, Cambridge.

== Career ==
Riley's composition, De Temporibus Canticum ('Take That Willy for a Walk'), was commissioned by Cranbrook Choral Society to celebrate the Millennium and gave its first performance in December 2000. Riley was also commissioned to write a celebratory piece to open Maidstone Symphony Orchestra's 100th season, titled "Fairmeadow – An Overture for Maidstone", first performed on 16 October 2010. He has performed at Derby Cathedral and Bridlington Priory.

He was Director of Music at Cranbrook School from 1985 to December 2011.

Riley is also the author of two books concerning organist and composer Percy Whitlock. His first, "Percy Whitlock - A Biographical Study" was published to critical acclaim, as was the "Percy Whitlock Companion", a collection of letters and diary extracts of the early 20th-century composer.

He left Invicta Grammar School in Maidstone in July 2017, after five years as the leader of the Music Department.
