= Elliði Vignisson =

Mayor of Ölfus
- Incumbent
- Assumed office 9 August 2018
- Preceded by: Gunnsteinn R. Ómarsson

Mayor of Vestmannaeyjar
- In office 15 June 2006 – June 2018
- Preceded by: Bergur Elías Agústsson
- Succeeded by: Íris Róbertsdóttir

Personal details
- Born: 28 April 1969 (age 57)
- Party: Independence Party

Elliði Vignisson is the mayor of Ölfus and the former mayor of Vestmannaeyjar, Iceland. He is well known in the country in his work as mayor and as a member of the Independence Party. His affiliation with the Independence Party marks him as a figure within a specific political ideology in Iceland. His engagement extends beyond local issues, as evidenced by his participation in celebrations of Icelandic heritage in Spanish Fork, Utah, highlighting his connection with the Icelandic diaspora.

== Biography ==
Elliði Vignisson was born on April 28, 1969. He holds a Bachelor of Arts and a Master's degree in Psychology from the University of Copenhagen, earned in 1998. In 1996, he obtained a teaching qualification from the University of Iceland, and he also studied public administration at the same institution.

He is married to Bertha I. Johansen, an Icelandic language scholar and high school teacher. They have two children: Nökkvi Dan Elliðason, a mathematician, and Bjartey Bríet Elliðadóttir, a university student.

== Political career ==
=== Vestmannaeyjar ===
Elliði Vignisson served as a member of the Vestmannaeyjar town council for fifteen years, from 2003 to 2018. He was the mayor of Vestmannaeyjar for twelve years, from June 15, 2006, to June 2018.

=== Ölfus ===
Since August 9, 2018, Elliði Vignisson has been the mayor of Ölfus municipality. In this role, he has focused on attracting investments in green technology and aquaculture to the region. He chairs the Ölfus Cluster, an organization dedicated to green industrial development and innovation in the area.

== Political Affiliation ==
Elliði Vignisson is a member of the Independence Party. He led the Independence Party list in Vestmannaeyjar for twelve years.

== Professional Background ==
Before becoming a full-time politician, Elliði Vignisson worked as a teacher at Framhaldsskólann í Vestmannaeyjum (Vestmannaeyjar High School) for several years. He also has experience in psychology-related roles.
