= Kirchweih =

Religious celebration

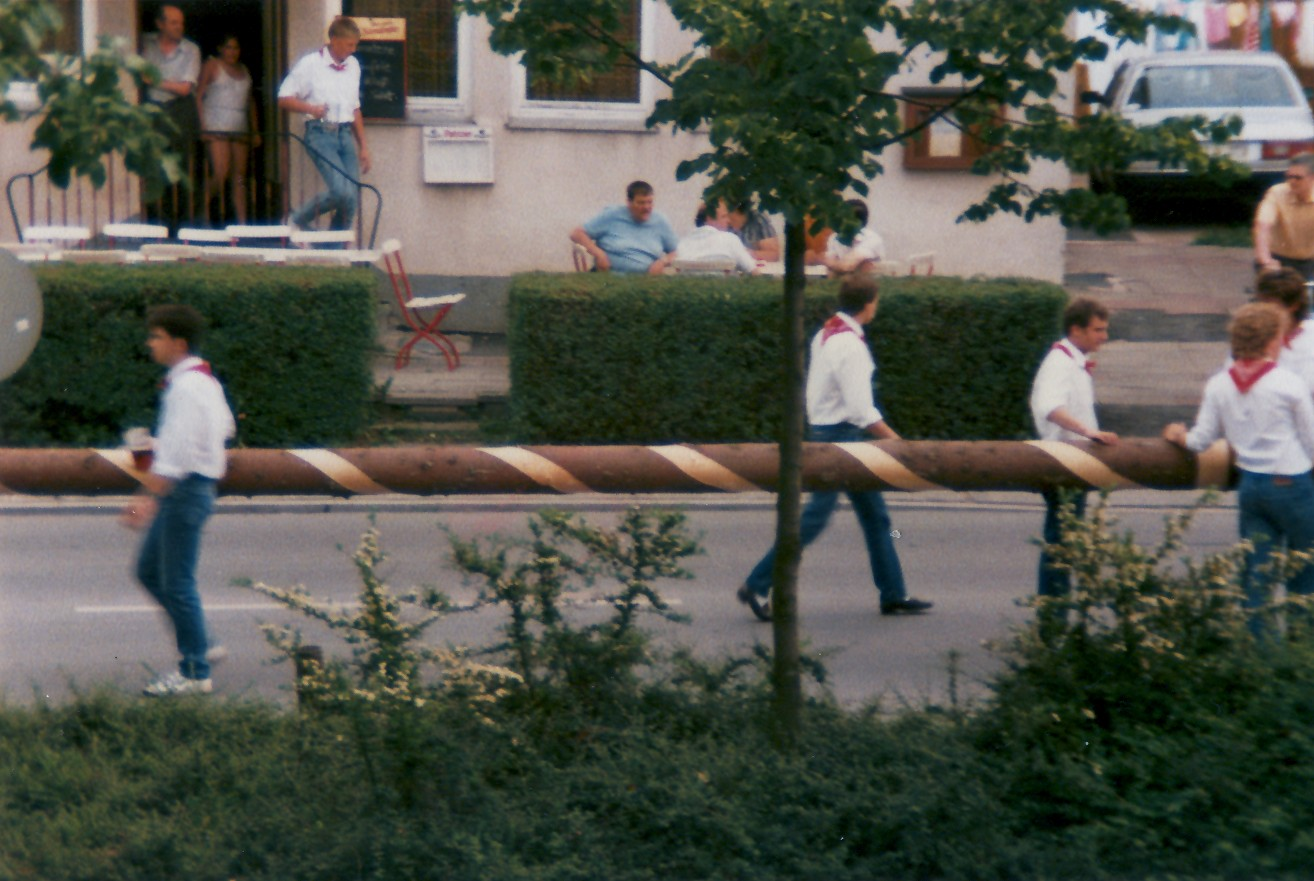
Erecting a tree, the Kärwabaum in Franconia

Kirchweih is literally the dedication of a church in German. More generally it also names the celebration of the anniversary of a dedication both at church and in local customs. The festivity is often on the day celebrating a church's patron saint or the day of laying the foundation stone, now often celebrated the following weekend. Customs vary locally in German-speaking countries, also local names such as Kirtag, Kärwa, Kirmes and Kilbi. In Bavaria, all Kirchweih celebrations have been fixed by royal order from the mid-19th century to the third Sunday in October (originally in order to roll back extensive local Kirchweih tourism having gotten out of hand in the government's eyes).

In the liturgy of the Catholic church, the Latin gradual, part of the proper of the mass for the feast day, is Locus iste, set to music for example as a motet by Anton Bruckner.

== See also ==
- Kermesse (festival)
