= Locus iste =

Latin gradual for the anniversary of the dedication of a church

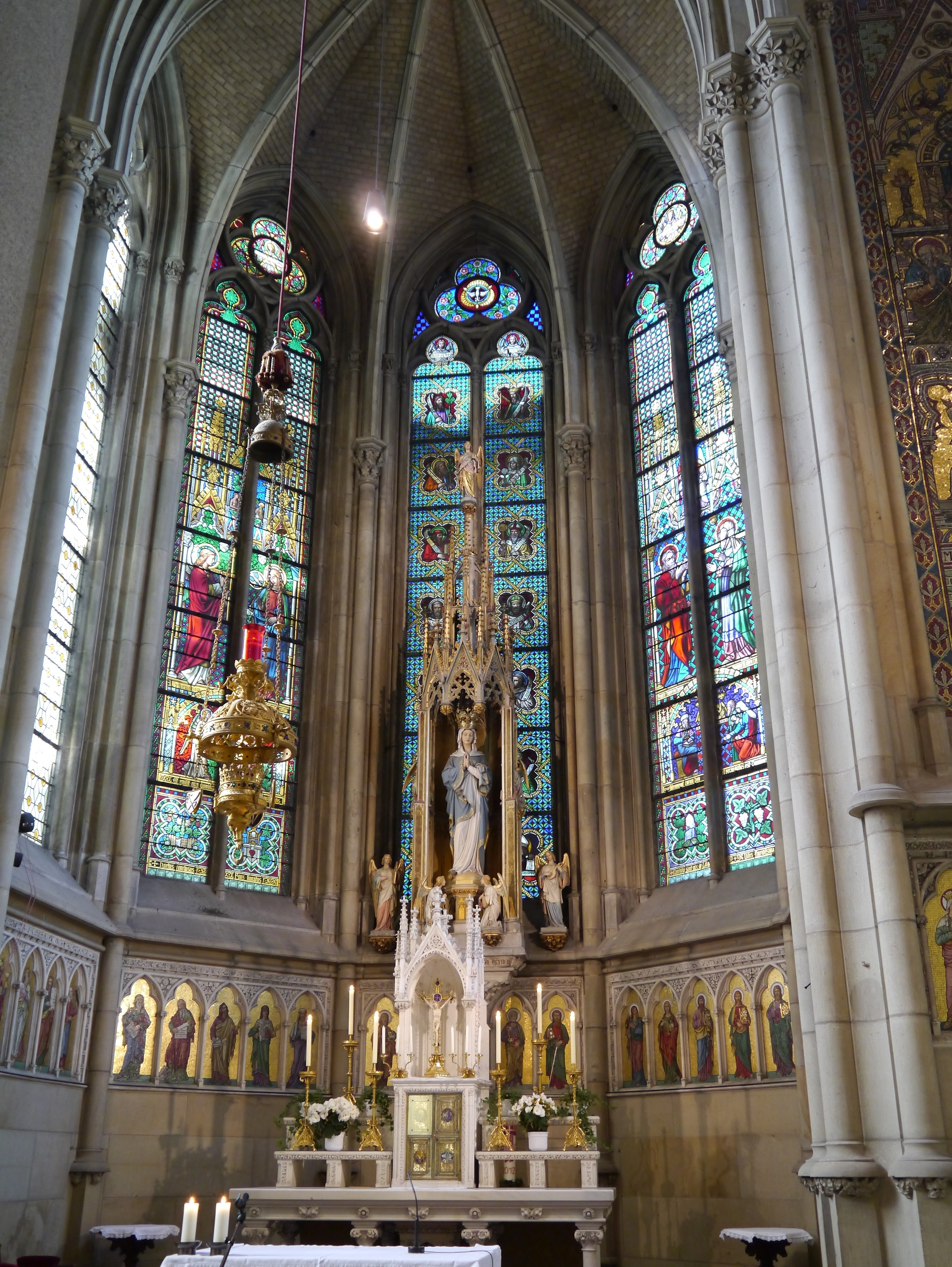
Chapel in the Linz Cathedral

Anton Bruckner's choral setting

Locus iste is the Latin gradual for the anniversary of the dedication of a church (Missa in anniversario dedicationis ecclesiae), which in German is called Kirchweih. The incipit Locus iste a Deo factus est translates to "This place was made by God". One of the most famous settings is by the Austrian composer Anton Bruckner.

== Text ==
The text is based on the Biblical story of Jacob's Ladder, Jacob's saying "Surely the Lord is in this place; and I knew it not" (Genesis 28:16), and the story of the burning bush where Moses is told "put off thy shoes from off thy feet, for the place whereon thou standest is holy ground" (Exodus 3:5).

Locus iste a Deo factus est,
inaestimabile sacramentum,
irreprehensibilis est.

This is the Lord's house, which He hath made.
Profoundly sacred,
it is beyond reproof.

A translation closer to the Latin is:

This place was made by God,
a priceless sacrament;
it is without reproach.

== Plainchant ==
The plainchant of the gradual appears in the Liber Usualis at p. 1064 of the 1924 edition (modern notation) and p. 1251 of the 1961 edition (chant notation) and also in the Graduale Novum on the p. 379.

== Bruckner's setting ==
Bruckner completed the motet for unaccompanied SATB choir in 1869 for the dedication of a votive chapel at the New Cathedral in Linz. The motet is often performed on anniversaries of church dedication. The piece, which takes about three minutes to perform, is in the key of C major and in common time.
