= Doctor Who Prom =

There have been four Doctor Who-themed concerts at The Proms. They took place in 2008, 2010, 2013, and 2024, respectively:

- Doctor Who Prom (2008)
