= Jónas Sigurðsson =

Icelandic singer

Jónas Sigurðsson at times just Jónas Sig (born c. 1974) is a well-known Icelandic singer. He performs solo and with his band Ritvélar Framtíðarinnar.

He started in Iceland with the band Sólstrandargæjarnir gaining fame with the song "Rangur maður". After the breakup of the band he moved for some years to Denmark, before returning to Iceland in 2007 releasing his debut album Þar sem malbikið svífur mun ég dansa which critics considered as one of the best Icelandic albums of the year. His follow-up album with the introduction of his new band Ritvélar Framtíðarinnar was Allt er eitthvað in 2010. The band is made up of Stefán Örn Gunnlaugsson (keyboards) and Ingi Björn Ingason (bass), Ómar Guðjónsson (guitar), Rósa Guðrún Sveinsdóttir (saxophone, backing vocals), Steinar Sigurðarson (saxophone), Snorri Sigurðarson and Kjartan Hákonarson (trumpet), Samúel Jón Samúelson (trombone), Kristinn Snær Agnarsson (drums), Kristjana Stefánsdóttir (glockenspiel, percussion, backing vocals).

His third album inspired by the sea was Þar sem himin ber við haf performed with the Icelandic brass band collective Lúðrasveit Þorlákshafnar.

== Discography ==
=== Albums ===
- 2007: Þar sem malbikið svífur mun ég dansa
- 2010: Allt er eitthvað
- 2012: Þar sem himin ber við haf
- 2018: Milda hjartað

=== Singles ===
- 2010: "Þyrnigerðið"
- 2014: "Hafið er svart" (with brass band Lúðrasveit Þorlákshafnar)
- 2015: "Af ávöxtunum skuluð þið þekkja þá"
