= Strandarkirkja =

- The Coastal Church
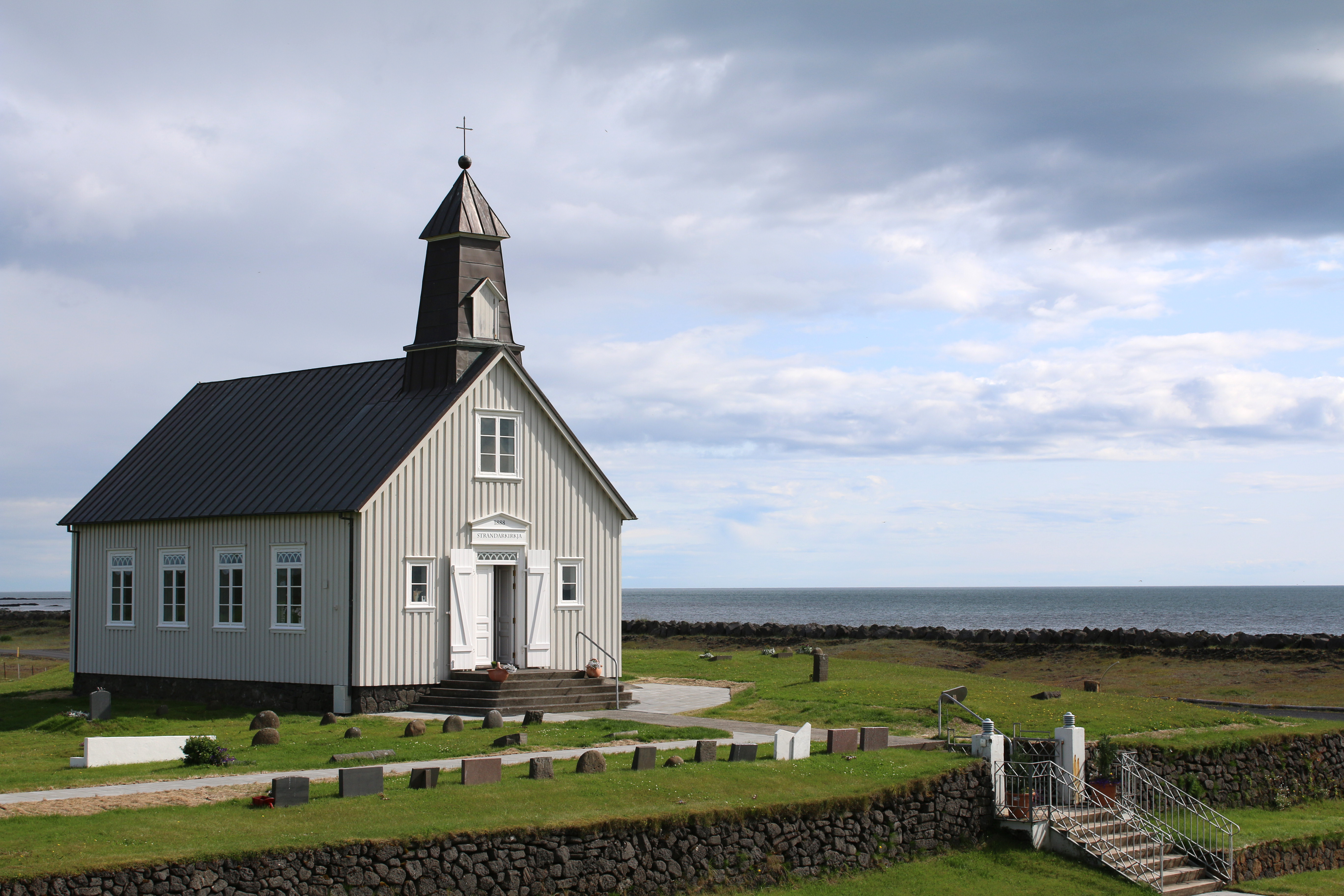
- Strandarkirkja
- Strandarkirkja
- 63°50′00″N 21°42′00″W
- Location: Ölfus Municipality, Southern Region
- Country: Iceland
- Denomination: Lutheran
- Website: Website of the Church

History
- Status: Active
- Founded: 12th Century

Architecture
- Functional status: Parish Church
- Completed: 1888

Administration
- Deanery: Strandarsókn
- Parish: Þorlákshafnarprestkall

Clergy
- Pastor: Baldur Kristjánsson

Strandarkirkja (Icelandic pronunciation: [ˈstrantarˌcʰɪr̥ca]) is a Lutheran (Church of Iceland) parish church in Selvogur [ˈsɛlˌvɔːɣʏr̥], on the southern coast of Iceland. The church is a landmark for travellers at sea. It has more supporters all over the world than any other church in Iceland and is often referred to as the ‘miracle church’ with the locals' longstanding belief that it has profound, divine powers.

== History ==
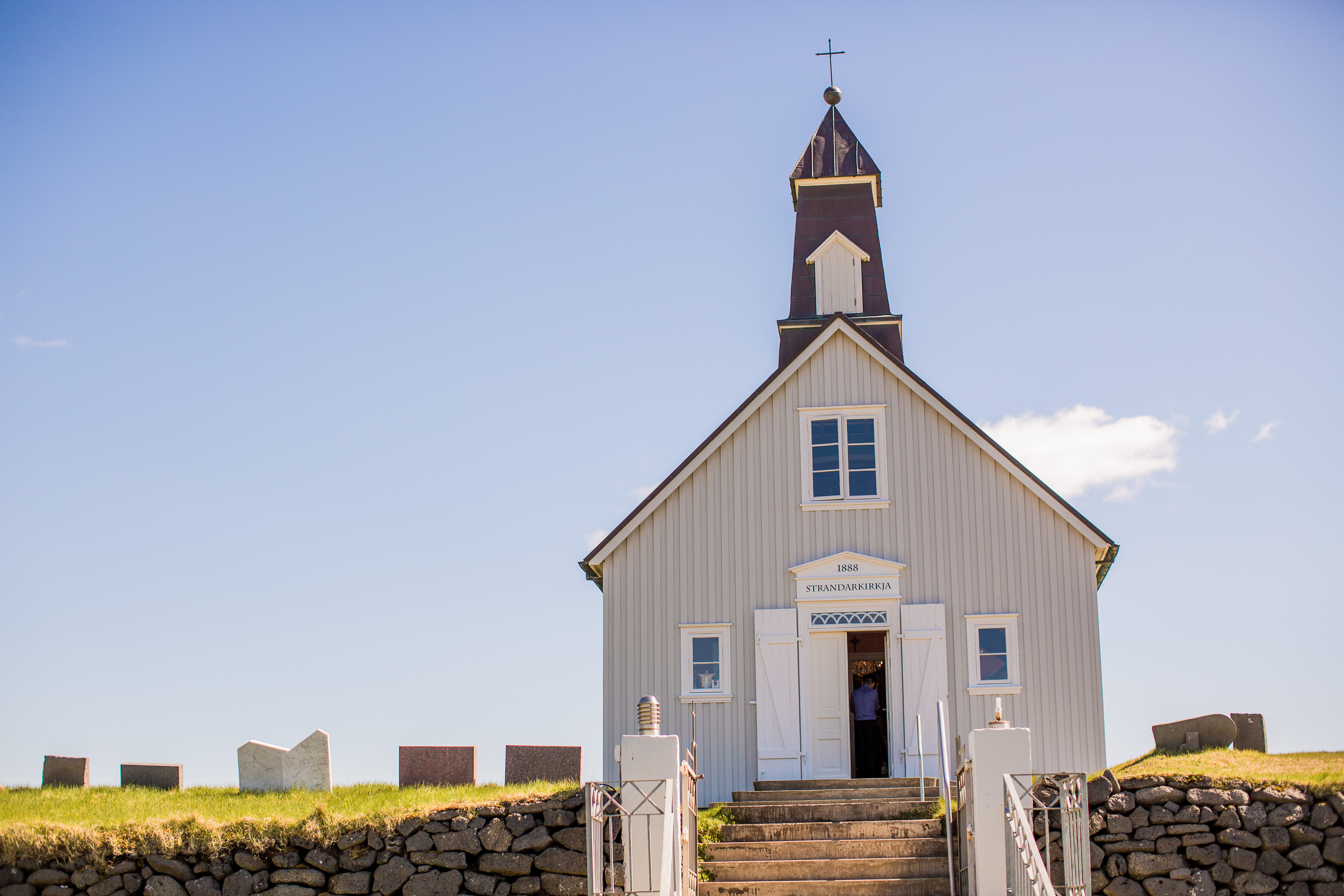
Front view of Strandarkirkja

The Church was originally built sometime in the 12th century. The story relates that one night, a group of sailors tried to navigate back to Iceland in a storm. The southern coast of Iceland is notorious for its hidden reefs and rough coast. The distressed sailors prayed to God for a safe return and vowed to build a church wherever they landed. When they ended their prayer, an angel appeared before their bow, seemingly made of light. The angel guided them through the rough surfs and led the crew into a bay for safe landing. The sailors, making good on the promise, built a wooden church at the site and named it Strandarkirkja. The bay nearby is named Angel's Bay (Icelandic: Engilsvík Icelandic pronunciation: [ˈeiɲcɪlsˌviːk]) to commemorate the incident. Many miracles have been attributed to Strandarkirkja, and there was a time when it was one of the wealthiest churches in Iceland, from the donations of Icelanders coming from all over the country in hopes of having their prayers and wishes realized.

=== The Estate of Strönd ===
In earlier times Strönd (Coast in Icelandic) was a rich farm, where both sea and land gave generously. The pastures were rich, consisting of good land facing south for grazing sheep and sheltered from the cold northern wind by the mountain Hlíðarfjall 5–6 km north of Selvogur. The good fishing grounds were also not far away so the farmers in Selvogur reaped from both the land and the sea. In addition to this there were mentions of farmers collecting timber from woods nearby and having the right to collect eggs and kill birds in the sea-cliffs at Krísuvíkurberg.

Census Population of Selvogur, 1703-2015
Year	Inhabitants
1703	154
1729	120
1801	115
1901	115
1920	114
1930	100
1990	12
2010	13
2015	14

=== Selvogur ===
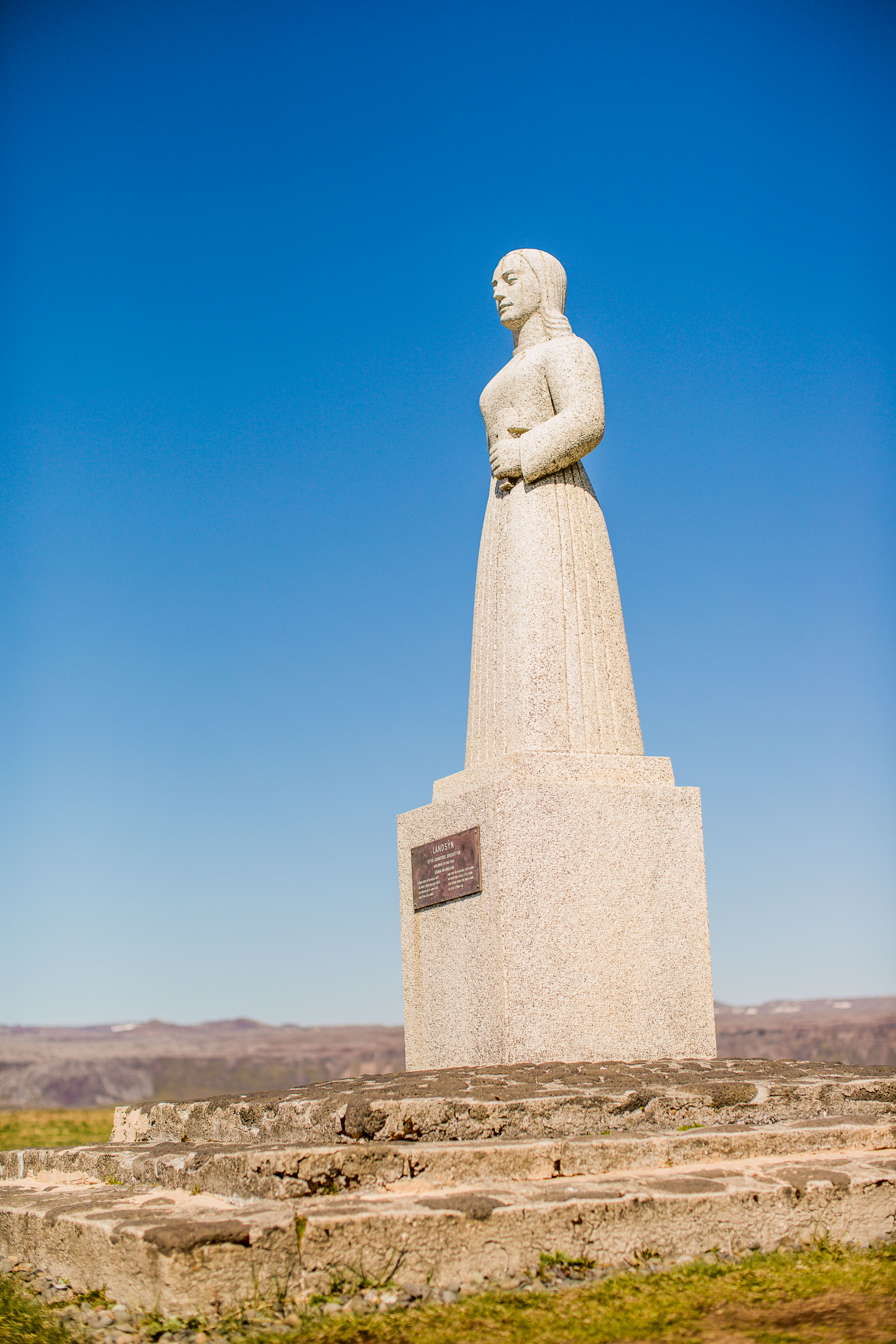
Landsýn in front of Strandarkirkja.

Strandarkirkja served as the parish church of the community of Selvogur (Seal Cove in Icelandic). In the early days of Icelandic settlement the area had numerous substantial farms. The town is first mentioned in Sturlunga Saga, where Gissur Þorvaldsson allows Dufgusi Þorleifsson take up residence there in the summer of 1238.

Over the years, the town began to decline as wind and water erosion began to cause a collapse of the farming culture. The population has dwindled substantially as people started to move into cities, dropping to little more than 110 at the turn of the 20th Century and to 14 people in 2015. Selvogur remained one of the most isolated settlements in the region, with electricity not being available in the area until 1970. Around the church, many abandoned farmhouses and other ruins can be seen as a reminder and insight into the life of the settlement in the past. Selvogur now has only a couple of isolated farms and a popular free campground, as well as a café T-Bær for the travelers passing through.

=== Present day ===
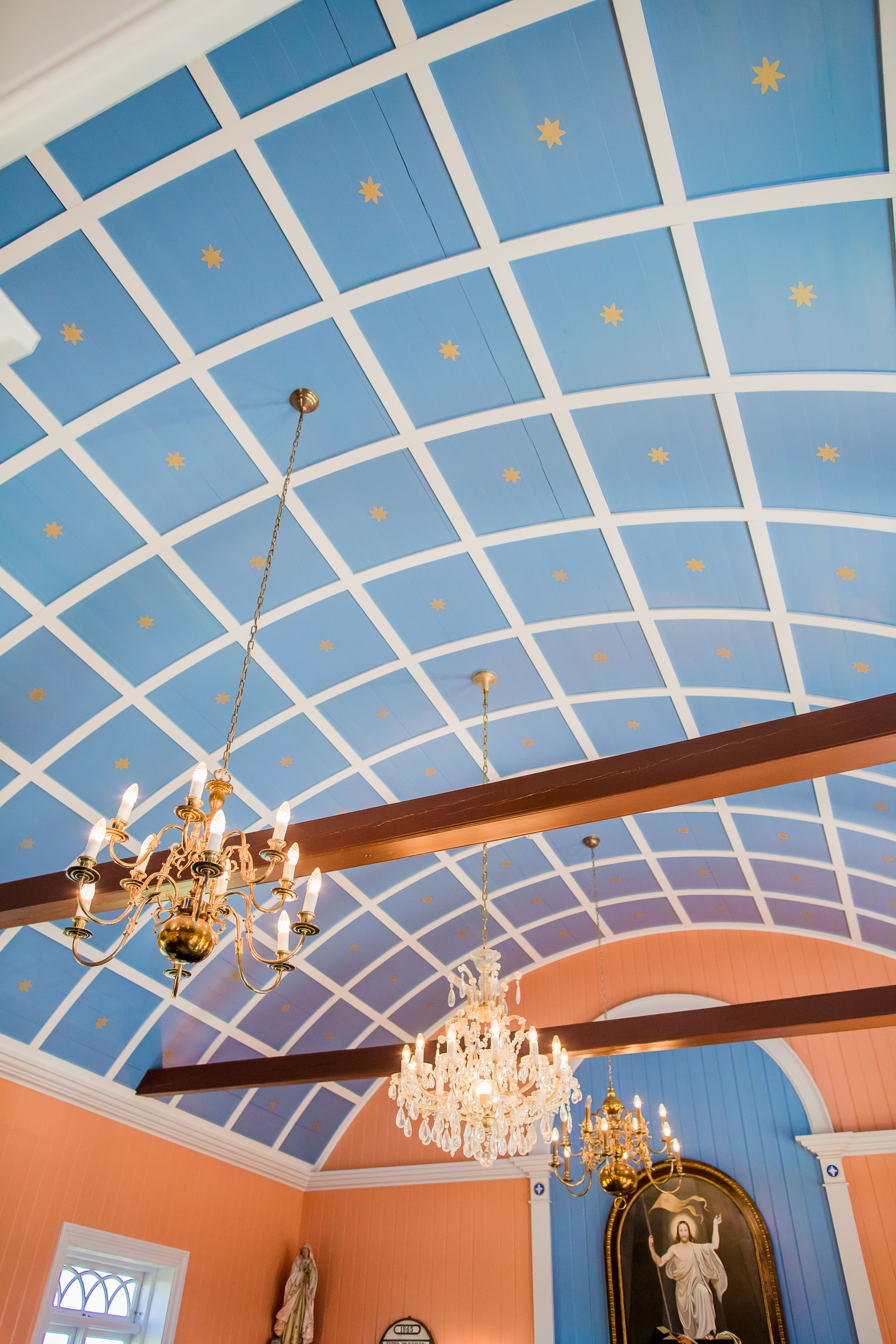
Interior view of the ceiling decor in Strandarkirkja

Strandarkirkja still functions as a parish church, although only on occasion. There is no longer a regular service for the small populace of Selvogur. The church is open in summer, from mid-May to August, hosting biweekly services, and is also open on weekends in spring and autumn. In addition, masses are also held by the parish priest on Christmas, Easter, and Pentecost. A harvest sermon (Uppskerumessa [ˈʏhpˌscɛːrʏˌmɛsːa]) is held at the end of August by ancient tradition to celebrate the end of the harvest season. There is also a fisherman's mass (Veiðimannamessa [ˈveiːðɪˌmanːaˌmɛsːa]) in October that is open to all, but primarily caters to the hunters with their hunting cabin at the nearby Hlíðarvatn, a lake owned by the church.

A statue of Norwegian granite carved by the Icelandic sculptor Gunnfríður Jónsdóttir (1889–1968) in 1950 called Landsýn [ˈlantˌsiːn], or 'Land in Sight', now stands by Strandarkirkja to commemorate the story of the church's founding. Gunnfríður Jónsdóttir herself is buried in the Strandarkirkja cemetery.

== Gallery ==
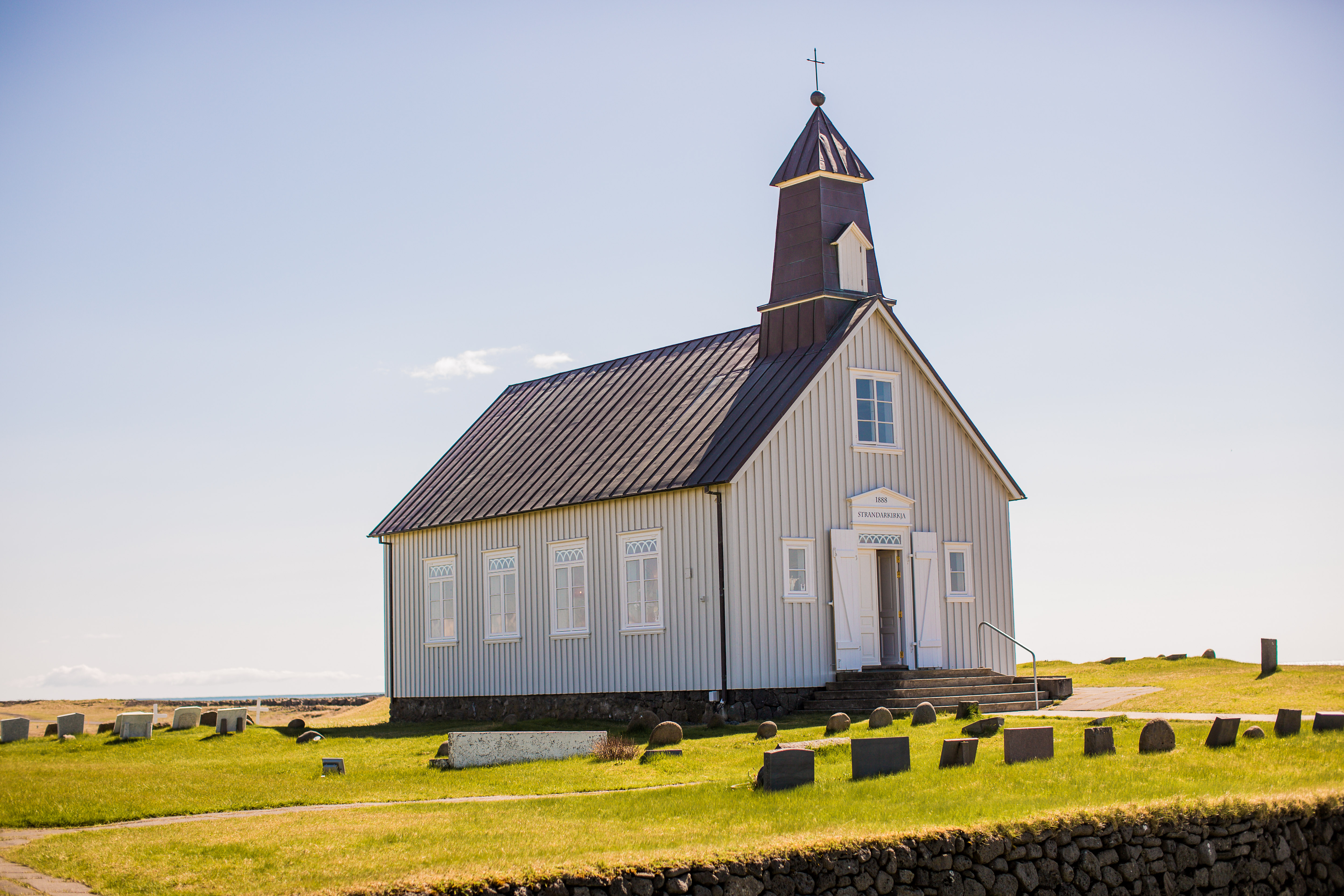
Strandarkirkja - exterior view

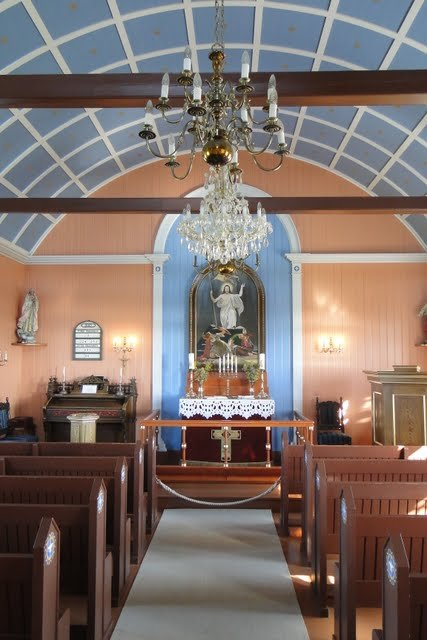
Strandarkirkja - interior view

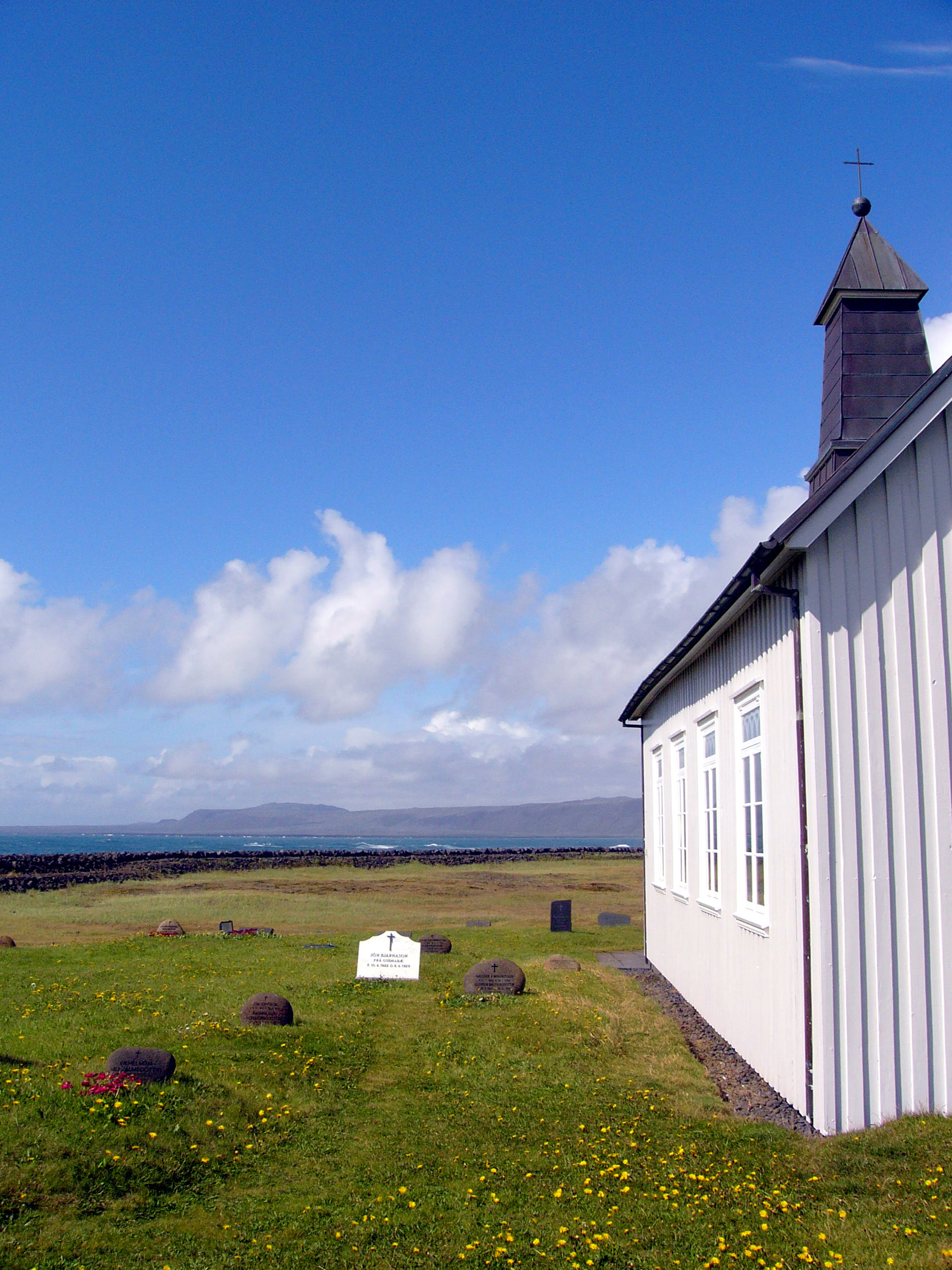
Strandarkirkja - exterior grounds with view of some graves

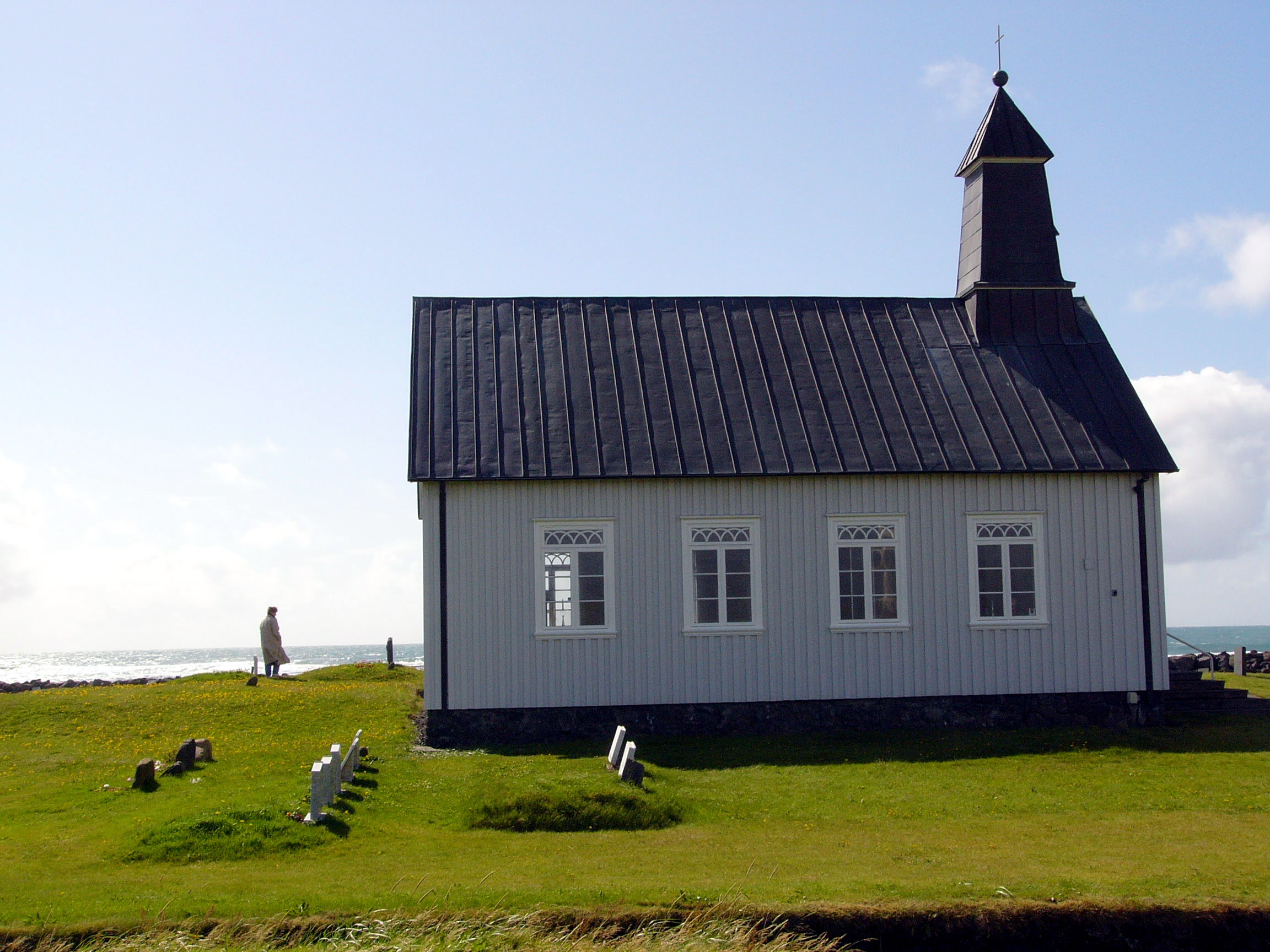
Strandarkirkja - side view from the north towards the ocean
