= Colorado State Highway 65 =

State highway in Colorado, United States

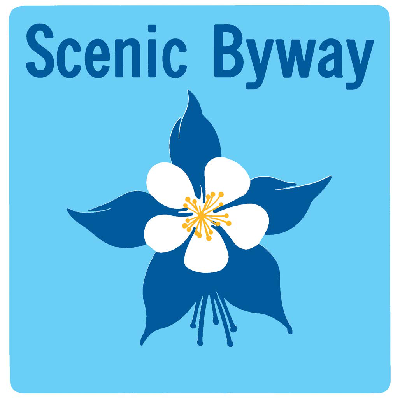
State Highway 65
- Grand Mesa National Scenic and Historic Byway
- SH 65 highlighted in red

Route information
- Maintained by CDOT
- Length: 61.377 mi (98.777 km)

Major junctions
- South end: SH 92 near Delta
- North end: I-70 / US 6 near Palisade

Location
- Country: United States
- State: Colorado
- Counties: Delta, Mesa

Highway system
- Colorado State Highway System; Interstate; US; State; Scenic
← SH 64	→ SH 66

State Highway 65 (SH 65) is a state highway in Colorado that crosses the Grand Mesa. The highway along with a road to Lands End Overlook were designated as the Grand Mesa National Scenic Byway in 1996. SH 65's southern terminus is at SH 92 east of Delta, and its northern terminus is at Interstate 70 (I-70) and U.S. Route 6 (US 6) northeast of Palisade.

== Route description ==
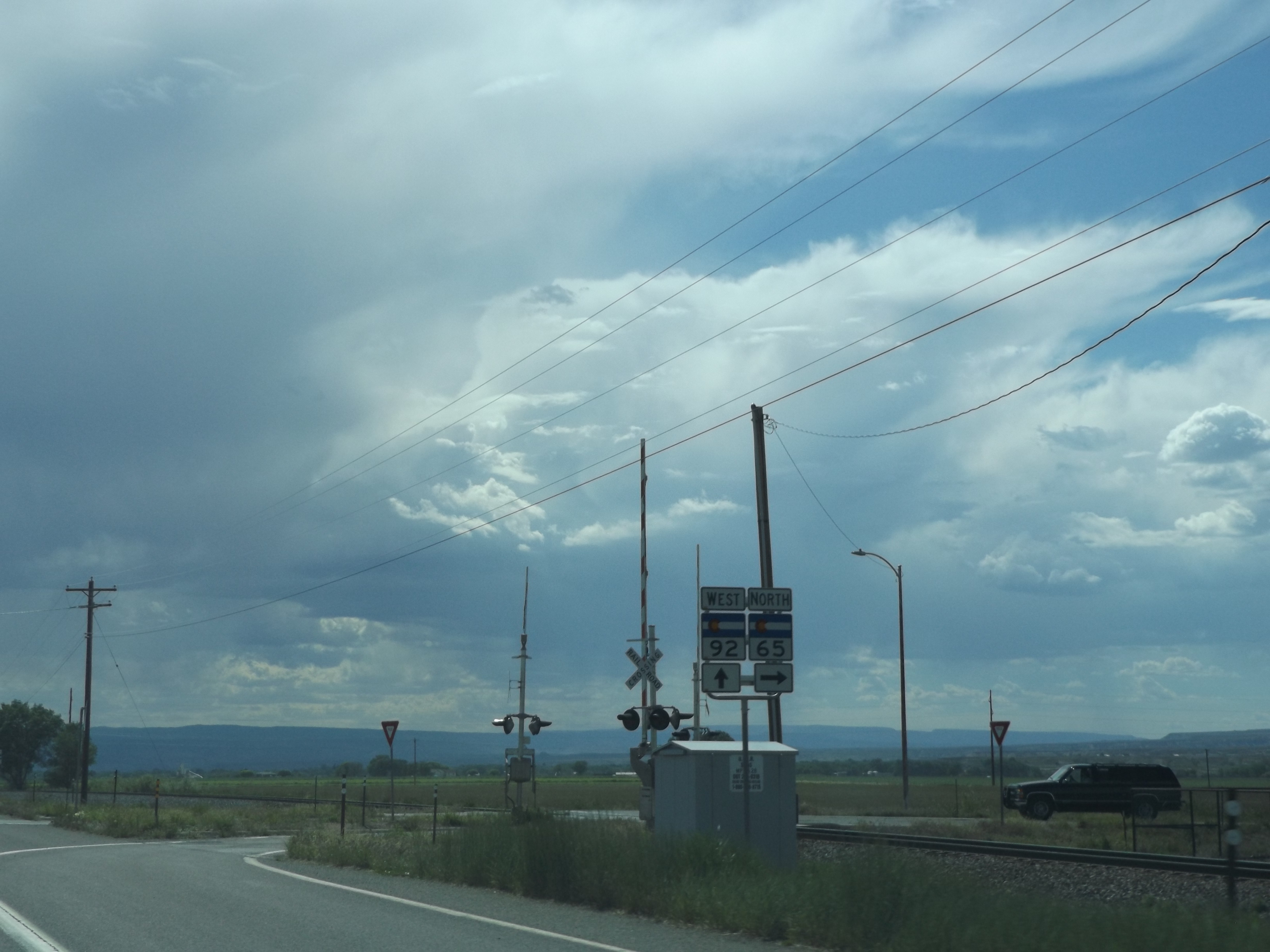
Southern terminus at SH 92

SH 65 runs 61.4 miles (98.8 km), starting at a junction with SH 92 east of Delta. The highway heads north, crossing the Gunnison River, through Orchard City and Cedaredge. The highway then enters Grand Mesa National Forest climbing to the top of Grand Mesa. It then drops down the north side of Grand Mesa, ending at a junction with I-70 northeast of Palisade.

=== Grand Mesa Scenic and Historic Byway ===
The byway runs north from Cedaredge along Highway 65, to the top of the Grand Mesa at more than 10,000 feet (3,000 m). It also includes Land's End Road to the Land's End Observatory from Highway 65. The byway continues past Island Lake, one of more than 300 trout-filled lakes in Grand Mesa National Forest. On the north side of the Mesa are the towns of Mesa, Collbran, and Powderhorn Ski Resort. The byway continues along De Beque Canyon, with its colorful sandstone bluffs, and eventually meets Interstate 70 in the town of De Beque.

Historic and scenic byway designations:

- National Scenic Byway received in 1996.
- Colorado Scenic and Historic Byway by the Colorado Department of Transportation received in 1991.
- Forest Service Byway received in 1992.

Scenic Overlooks include:

- Cedaredge overlook - an easy access overlook
- Land O Lakes overlook - a 1/4 mile moderate walk by foot
- Island Lake - an easy access overlook with restrooms and accessible boat ramp
- Grand Mesa Visitor Center - easy to moderate access with restrooms
- Mesa Lakes Lodge area - an easy to moderate access with restrooms
- Jumbo Lakes area - an easy access overlook with restrooms
- Skyway Point - an easy access
- Powderhorn - an easy access overlook with restrooms
- I-70 pullout and interpretation information

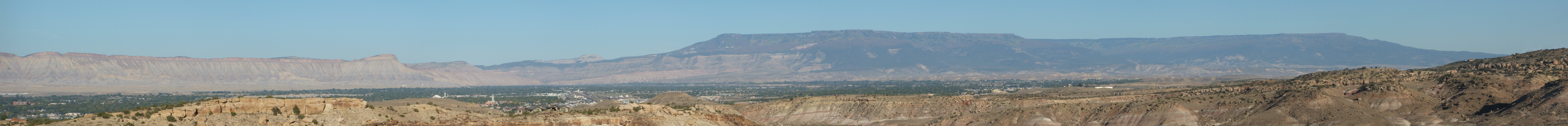
Grand Mesa and Mt. Garfield, near Grand Junction, Colorado

== Major intersections ==
County	Location	mi	km	Destinations	Notes
Delta	Saunders	0.000	0.000	SH 92 – Hotchkiss, Delta	Southern terminus
Delta	Cedaredge	10.856	17.471	Grand Mesa Scenic and Historic Byway begins	
Mesa		51.203	82.403	SH 330 east – Collbran	Western terminus of SH 330
Mesa		61.377	98.777	I-70 / US 6 – Grand Junction, Rifle	Northern terminus
1.000 mi = 1.609 km; 1.000 km = 0.621 mi

== Gallery ==
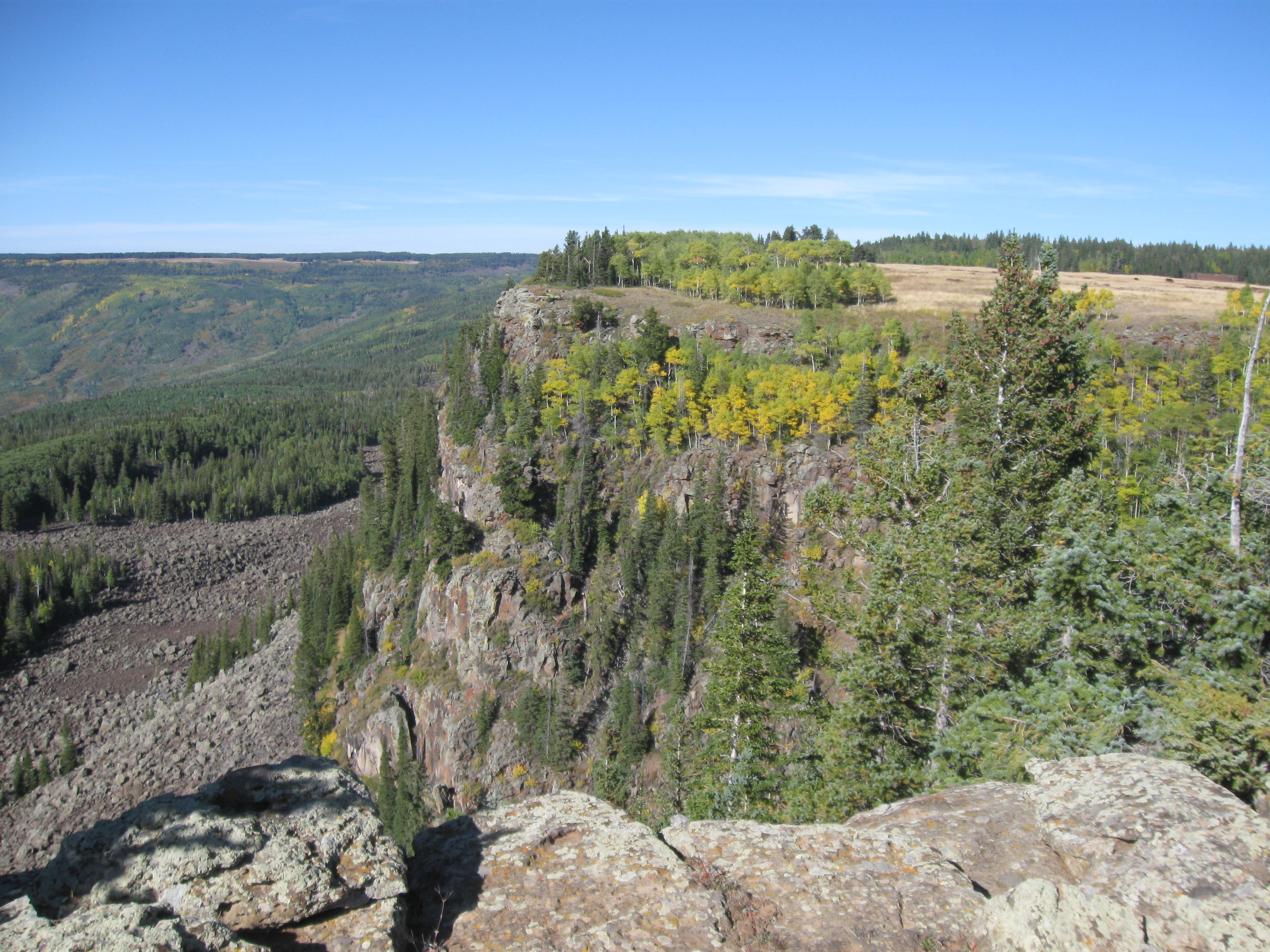
Cliff edge on Grand Mesa

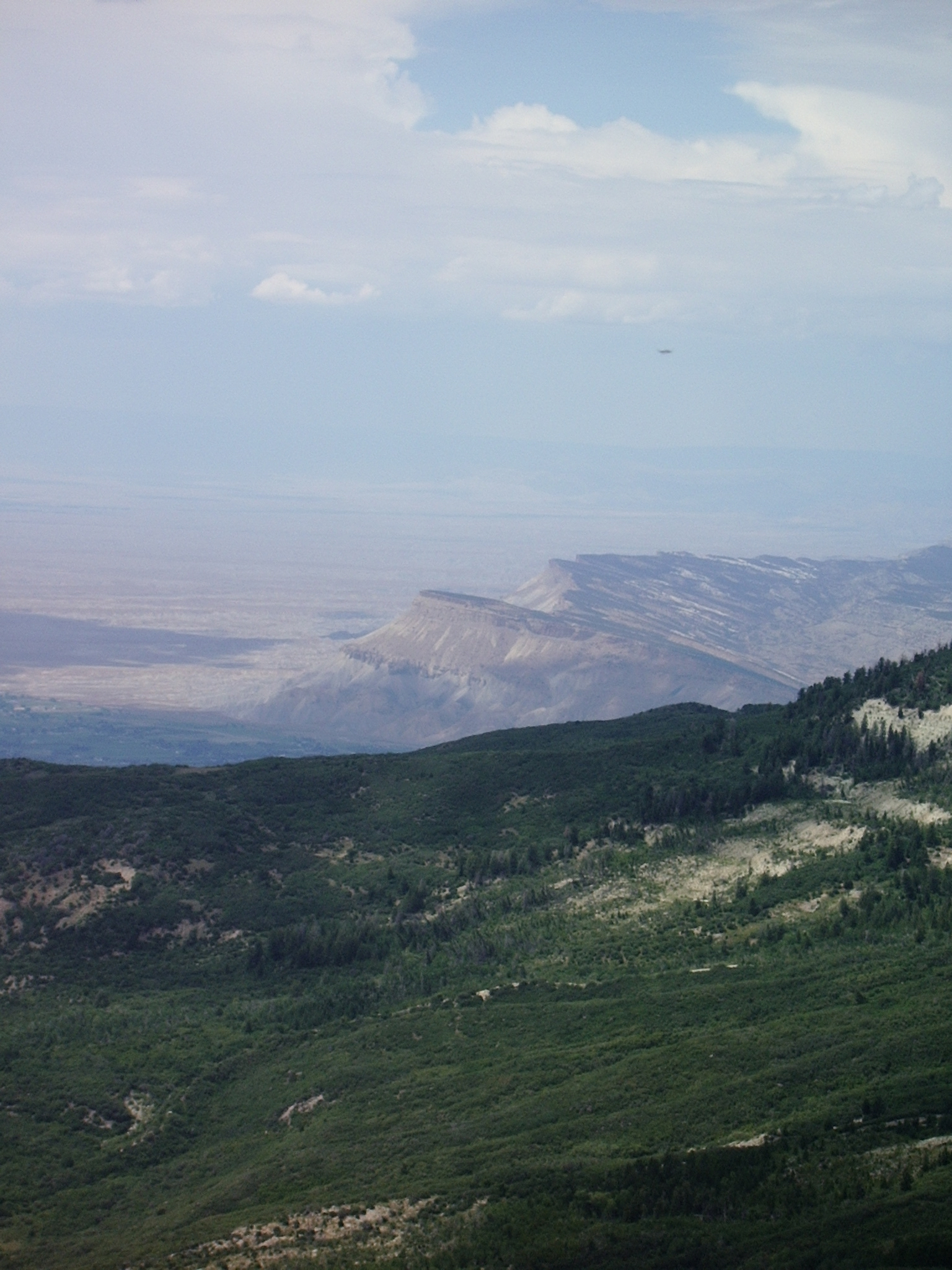
Observatory located on the western edge of the Grand Mesa

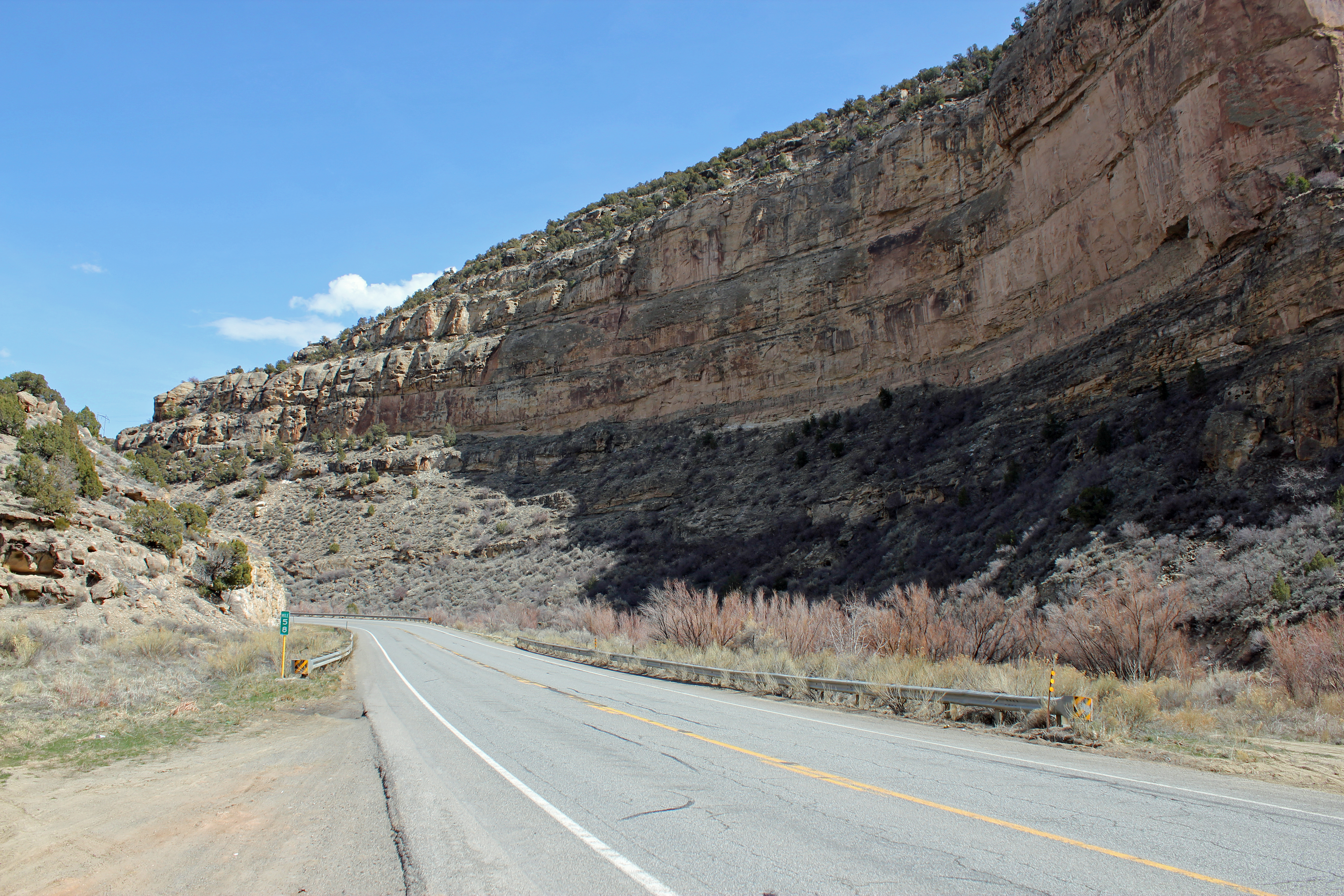
Near mile marker 58, or about 3.5 miles from Interstate-70.

== See also ==
- Grand Mesa National Forest
