= Colorado State Highway 330 =

State highway in Colorado, United States

State Highway 330
- SH 330 highlighted in red

Route information
- Maintained by CDOT
- Length: 11.395 mi (18.338 km)

Major junctions
- West end: SH 65 near Mesa
- East end: Grove Creek Road in Collbran

Location
- Country: United States
- State: Colorado
- Counties: Mesa

Highway system
- Colorado State Highway System; Interstate; US; State; Scenic
← SH 325	→ SH 340

State Highway 330 (SH 330) is a state highway in Mesa County, Colorado. SH 330's western terminus is at SH 65 north of Mesa, and the eastern terminus is at Grove Creek Road in Collbran.

== Route description ==
SH 330 runs 11.4 miles (18.3 km), starting at a junction with SH 65, heading east past Molina and ending at Grove Creek Road in Collbran. In 1995, the estimated traffic volume was 1050 vehicles per day near Molina and 1650 vehicles per day near Plateau City.

== Major intersections ==
The entire route is in Mesa County.

Location	mi	km	Destinations	Notes
	0.000	0.000	SH 65 – Grand Mesa, Cedaredge, Grand Junction	Western terminus
Collbran	11.395	18.338	Grove Creek Road	Eastern terminus
1.000 mi = 1.609 km; 1.000 km = 0.621 mi

== See also ==
- List of state highways in Colorado
