= Powderhorn =

Powderhorn may refer to the following in the United States:

== Colorado ==
- Powderhorn Resort, a ski area
- Powderhorn Wilderness, an area in Hinsdale and Gunnison counties
- Powderhorn, Colorado, an unincorporated community

== Minnesota ==
- Powderhorn, Minneapolis, a community
- Powderhorn Park, Minneapolis, a neighborhood
- Powderhorn Park (urban park) in the Minneapolis neighborhood of the same name

== See also ==
- Big Powderhorn Mountain
- Powder Horn (disambiguation)
- Powderhorn Lake (disambiguation)
