= Whitewater Creek (Colorado) =

River in Colorado, US

Location
- Country: United States
- State: Colorado
- Cities: Whitewater, Land's End

Physical characteristics
- Source: Grand Mesa
  - coordinates: 39°3′7″N 108°11′22″W
  - elevation: 8,008 ft (2,441 m)
- Mouth: Gunnison River (Colorado)
  - location: Colorado, United States
  - coordinates: 38°58′42″N 108°27′11″W

Whitewater Creek is a stream in Mesa County, Colorado. The stream goes from Land's End to Whitewater, Colorado.

== See also ==
- List of rivers of Colorado
