= Whitewater, Colorado =

Unincorporated community in Mesa County, CO, USA

- Unincorporated community
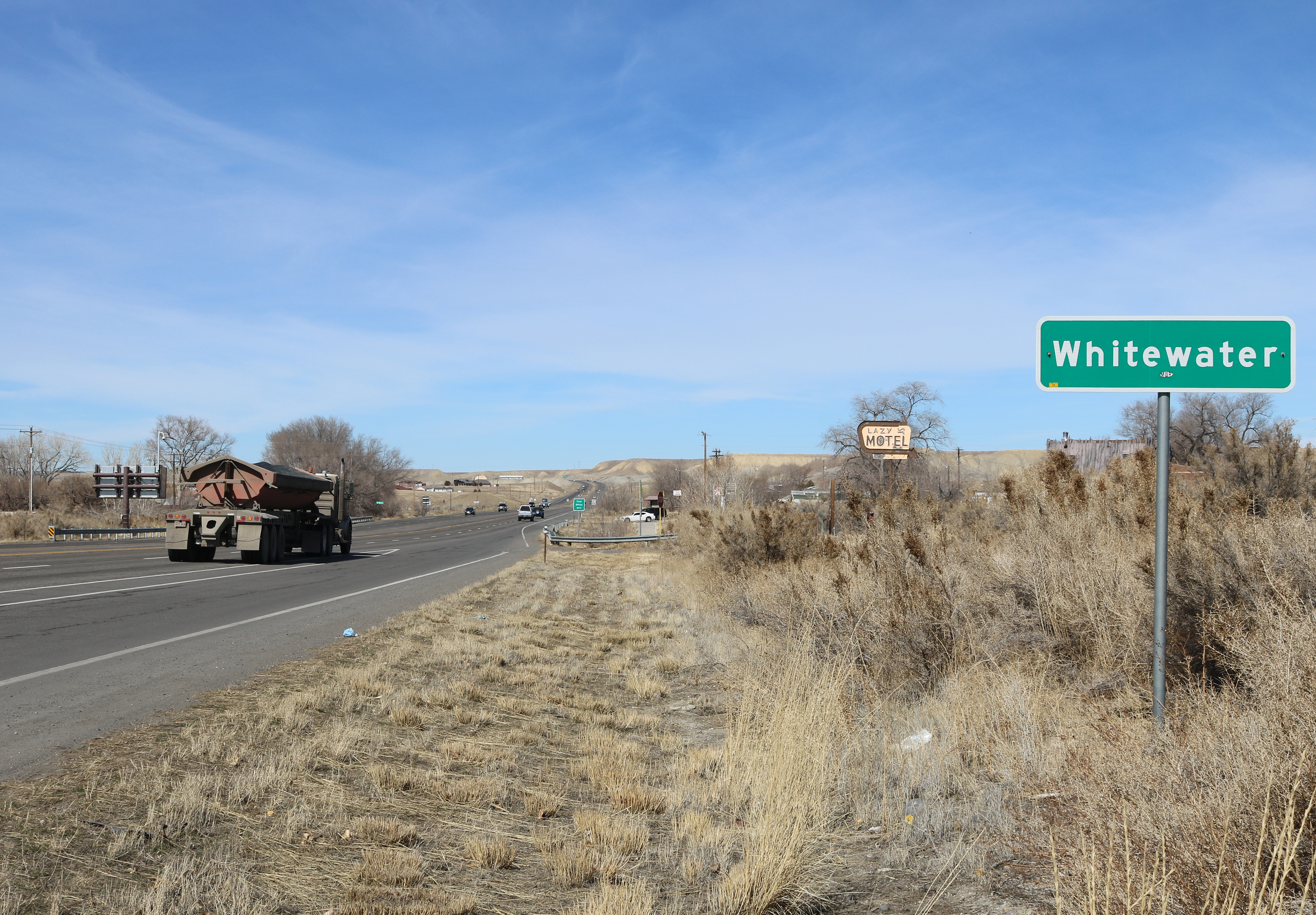
- Looking north along U.S. Highway 50 in Whitewater

- Location within Colorado Location within the United States
- Coordinates: 38°59′28″N 108°27′12″W
- Country: United States
- State: Colorado
- County: Mesa County
- Elevation: 4,646 ft (1,416 m)
- Time zone: UTC-7 (MST)
  - Summer (DST): UTC-6 (MDT)
- ZIP code: 81527
- Area code: 970
- GNIS feature ID: 185236

Whitewater is an unincorporated community in Mesa County, Colorado, United States, just south of Grand Junction. The Whitewater Post Office has the ZIP Code 81527. It is located on the banks of the Gunnison River near the confluences with Whitewater Creek and Kannah Creek to the south.

== Historic places ==
Near Whitewater are the following historic places:

- Bloomfield Site is a prehistoric archaeological site from 8999 BC - AD 1799, starting with the Archaic culture. It was added to the National Register of Historic Places in 1983.
- Land’s End Aboriginal Site, an archaeological site from the Archaic prehistoric period, is listed on the Colorado State Register of Historic Properties.
- Land's End Observatory is a historic ranger observatory, off of the Grand Mesa Scenic and Historic Byway, with a panoramic view of western Colorado and eastern Utah. It is listed on the National Register of Historic Places.

== Education ==
Colorado Mesa University, located in Grand Junction, operates two facilities in Whitewater:

- Western Colorado Law Enforcement Training Center, serving students in CMU's police academy program
- Forensic Investigation Research Station, used by CMU's Forensic Science program for medico-legal investigation

== See also ==
- Old Spanish National Historic Trail
- List of prehistoric sites in Colorado
