= Edith J. Agnew =

American author of children's books

- Born: Edith Josephine Agnew; October 12, 1897 Denver, Colorado, United States
- Died: February 20, 1988 (aged 90) Santa Fe, New Mexico, United States
- Resting place: Delta, Colorado, United States
- Genre: Children's books

Edith Josephine Agnew (October 13, 1897 – February 20, 1988) was an American author of children's books.

Agnew was born on October 13, 1897, in Denver, Colorado, the daughter of Ella Josephine Dunlap and Charles Clinton Agnew. She had a sister, Helen, and two brothers, Donald and Dwight. She lived in Mesa, Colorado and Delta, Colorado during her first years of life.

She became a teacher in Delta and later in Logan, Utah. After retiring from teaching, she began writing books.

Her first book was a collection of poems titled The Songs of Marcelino. She went on to write a few more children's books, including Sandy and Mr. Jalopy (1948), Leo of Alaska (1958), and People of the Way (1960),

Agnew died on February 20, 1988, in Santa Fe, New Mexico, at the age of 90, and was buried in Delta, Colorado.

== Bibliography ==
- My Alaska Picture Story Book (1948)
- Sandy and Mr Jalopy (1949)
- The Gray Eyes Family (1952)
- The Songs of Marcelino (1953)
- Leo of Alaska (1958)
- Nezbah's Lamb (1959)
