= Kannah Creek =

Coordinates: 38°56′17″N 108°26′49″W

Kannah Creek is a watershed that descends from the top of the Grand Mesa west southwest, where it meets the Gunnison River about 25 miles south of Grand Junction, Colorado. It offers many recreational opportunities, irrigation, and is an important source of drinking water for Grand Junction. The Grand Mesa is one of the largest flat topped mountains in the world and has over 300 lakes and reservoirs on top, many of which are in the Kannah Creek watershed, which help retain much of Grand Junction's drinking water throughout the year as the snowpack melts and converts into runoff. Kannah Creek is also the namesake for the locally popular Kannah Creek Brewing Company. Kannah Creek is an extremely important source of water, originating on an elevated oasis, in an otherwise very arid region.

== Recreation ==
The watershed offers many recreational options. There are four trails that utilize the valley, formed by the creek and its tributaries. The trails offer access to hiking, biking, camping, fishing, and pack riding. The Kannah Creek trail is 7.88 miles long from the base of the mesa to the upper rim, ending at Carson Lake. Canoeing and Kayaking are also possible in a few areas in the lower basin of the creek and is rated a class of III-V by American Whitewater. There is also plenty of wildlife in the area. In the pine and aspen forest on the higher altitude areas of the Grand Mesa, elk are plentiful, deer, foxes and coyotes, eagles and hawks, marmots, bighorn sheep, canada lynx, mountain goats songbirds. Fishing offers a bounty of brook, rainbow, and cutthroat trout. The newly reintroduced moose is also said to be thriving. The trails start in juniper and pinyon pine forest and moves up to pine and aspen forest as elevation is gained.

== Human usage ==
Kannah Creek is derived from snowpack that accumulates all winter and spring and acts as a frozen reservoir where it slowly melts and runs off all year. The city of Grand Junction has cooperated with many governmental and private property owners to create small dams and reservoirs on top of the Grand Mesa to store water from snowmelt year round. The water from the reservoirs is partially let to manumit down the drainage, and then stored again at the base of the mesa in Juniata Reservoir and the other Purdy Mesa Reservoirs. From there the water is taken in and treated at the Kannah Creek Water Plant, in Whitewater, CO. Afterwards gravity is used to channel and divert water to storage points located around the Grand Junction Metropolitan Statistical Area. The creation of this system was initiated by local vote, and a large majority desire for a new, raw, and especially fresh and clean water source rather than the replaced source which acquired water out of the heavy-flowing, sediment filled, Gunnison River. The Creek also provides a source of irrigation for the many farms in the lower basin of the creek beneath the mesa. It is a popular fruit growing region.
