= Powder Horn =

A powder horn was a container for gunpowder.

Powder Horn or Powder horn may also refer to:

- Powder Horn (album), 2014 album by Shit and Shine
- Powder Horn (Boy Scouts of America), the Venturing training program offered by the Boy Scouts of America
- Powder Horn Island, former name of Calumet Island in the Thousand Islands region of New York
- Powder Horn Mountain, a community in Triplett, Watauga County, North Carolina
- Powder Horn, Wyoming, a census-designated place

== See also ==
- Powderhorn (disambiguation)
