= Powderhorn Lake =

Powderhorn Lake may refer to the following:

== Canada ==
- Powderhorn Lake (Newfoundland and Labrador)
- Powderhorn Lake (Nova Scotia)
- Powderhorn Lake (Ontario)

== United States ==
- Powderhorn Lake (Colorado) in the Powderhorn Wilderness
- Powderhorn Lake (Illinois) in Cook County
- Powderhorn Lake (Michigan) adjacent to Otter Lake
- Powderhorn Lake (Minnesota) in Minneapolis
- Powderhorn Lake (Texas) in Calhoun County

== See also ==
- Powder Horn Pond, a lake in the U.S. state of Massachusetts
