= Collbran, Colorado =

Town in Colorado, US

- Statutory town
- Town of Collbran
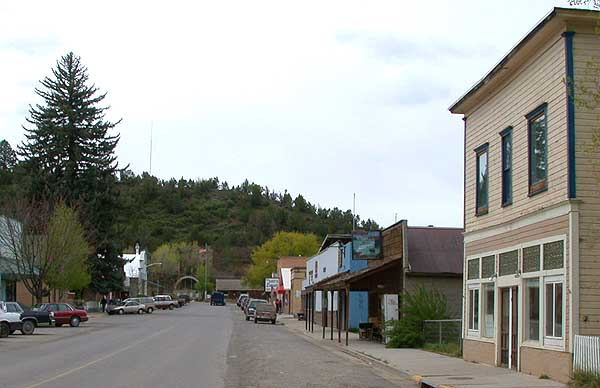
- Main Street in downtown Collbran

- Flag Logo
- Motto: "Preserving the Past, Conserving the Future."
- Location of the Town of Collbran in Mesa County, Colorado
- Coordinates: 39°14′42″N 107°57′28″W
- Country: United States
- State: Colorado
- County: Mesa
- Incorporated: July 22, 1908

Government
  - Type: Statutory town

Area
  - Total: 0.558 sq mi (1.446 km^{2})
  - Land: 0.558 sq mi (1.446 km^{2})
  - Water: 0 sq mi (0.000 km^{2})
- Elevation: 5,988 ft (1,825 m)

Population (2020)
  - Total: 369
  - Density: 661/sq mi (255/km^{2})
- Time zone: UTC−07:00 (MST)
  - Summer (DST): UTC−06:00 (MDT)
- ZIP code: 81624
- Area codes: 970/748
- GNIS town ID: 2413226
- FIPS code: 08-15605
- Website: www.colorado.gov/townofcollbran

Collbran is a statutory town located in Mesa County, Colorado, United States. The town's population was 369 at the 2020 Census. Collbran is a part of the Grand Junction, CO Metropolitan Statistical Area.

== Description ==
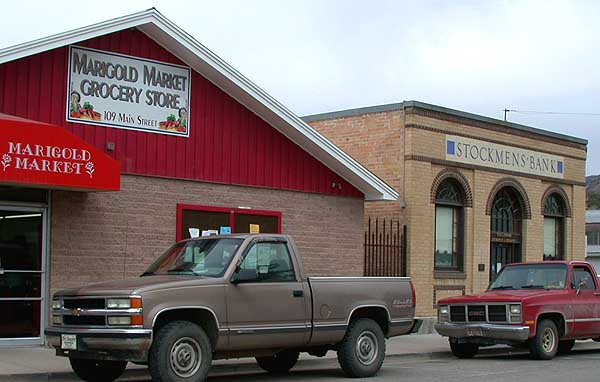
Main Street in downtown Collbran

The town is located east of Grand Junction along Plateau Creek, at the upper (eastern) end of the small cattle ranching valley around the creek known as the Plateau Valley. The largest community in the valley, it serves a civic and economic center for the surrounding area, which is dependent not only ranching, but on pass-through tourism during the summer and autumn months. In the latter capacity, the town acts somewhat as a gateway to nearby Vega State Park and other recreational sites along the northeast side of the Grand Mesa via the Grand Mesa Scenic and Historic Byway.

== History ==
The Collbran, Colorado, post office opened on January 9, 1892, and the Town of Collbran was incorporated on July 22, 1908. The nearby Job Corps center, which holds 220 students, opened on June 15th, 1965.

== Geography ==
The 2020 United States census recorded the town as having a total area of 357 acres (1.446 km^{2}), all of it land.

=== Climate ===
The Köppen climate classification subtype for this climate is "Dfb" (Warm Summer Continental Climate).

Climate data for Collbran, Colorado
Month	Jan	Feb	Mar	Apr	May	Jun	Jul	Aug	Sep	Oct	Nov	Dec	Year
Mean daily maximum °C (°F)	2 (35)	5 (41)	10 (50)	15 (59)	21 (69)	27 (80)	30 (86)	29 (84)	24 (75)	18 (64)	9 (48)	3 (37)	16 (60)
Mean daily minimum °C (°F)	−12 (10)	−9 (15)	−5 (23)	0 (32)	3 (37)	7 (44)	10 (50)	9 (48)	5 (41)	0 (32)	−6 (21)	−11 (12)	0 (32)
Average precipitation mm (inches)	28 (1.1)	28 (1.1)	38 (1.5)	38 (1.5)	38 (1.5)	20 (0.8)	28 (1.1)	36 (1.4)	38 (1.5)	38 (1.5)	28 (1.1)	25 (1)	380 (15)
Source: Weatherbase

== Demographics ==
Historical population
Census	Pop.	Note	%±
1910	156		—
1920	286		83.3%
1930	341		19.2%
1940	301		−11.7%
1950	237		−21.3%
1960	310		30.8%
1970	225		−27.4%
1980	344		52.9%
1990	228		−33.7%
2000	388		70.2%
2010	708		82.5%
2020	369		−47.9%
U.S. Decennial Census

As of the 2000 Census, there were 388 people, 145 households, and 100 families residing in the town. The population density was 777.1 inhabitants per square mile (300.0/km^{2}). There were 161 housing units at an average density of 322.5 per square mile (124.5/km^{2}). The racial makeup of the town was 98.20% White, 0.26% Native American, 0.77% from other races, and 0.77% from two or more races. Hispanic or Latino of any race were 4.12% of the population.

There were 145 households, out of which 36.6% had children under the age of 18 living with them, 53.8% were married couples living together, 9.7% had a female householder with no husband present, and 31.0% were non-families. 27.6% of all households were made up of individuals, and 12.4% had someone living alone who was 65 years of age or older. The average household size was 2.50 and the average family size was 3.03.

In the town, the population was spread out, with 29.6% under the age of 18, 3.6% from 18 to 24, 26.8% from 25 to 44, 23.5% from 45 to 64, and 16.5% who were 65 years of age or older. The median age was 38 years. For every 100 females, there were 87.4 males. For every 100 females age 18 and over, there were 84.5 males.

The median income for a household in the town was $32,500, and the median income for a family was $36,016. Males had a median income of $28,438 versus $27,917 for females. The per capita income for the town was $17,080. About 5.9% of families and 14.7% of the population were below the poverty line, including 17.2% of those under age 18 and 8.0% of those age 65 or over.

== See also ==
- Grand Junction, CO Metropolitan Statistical Area
