= Land's End Observatory =

- U.S. National Register of Historic Places
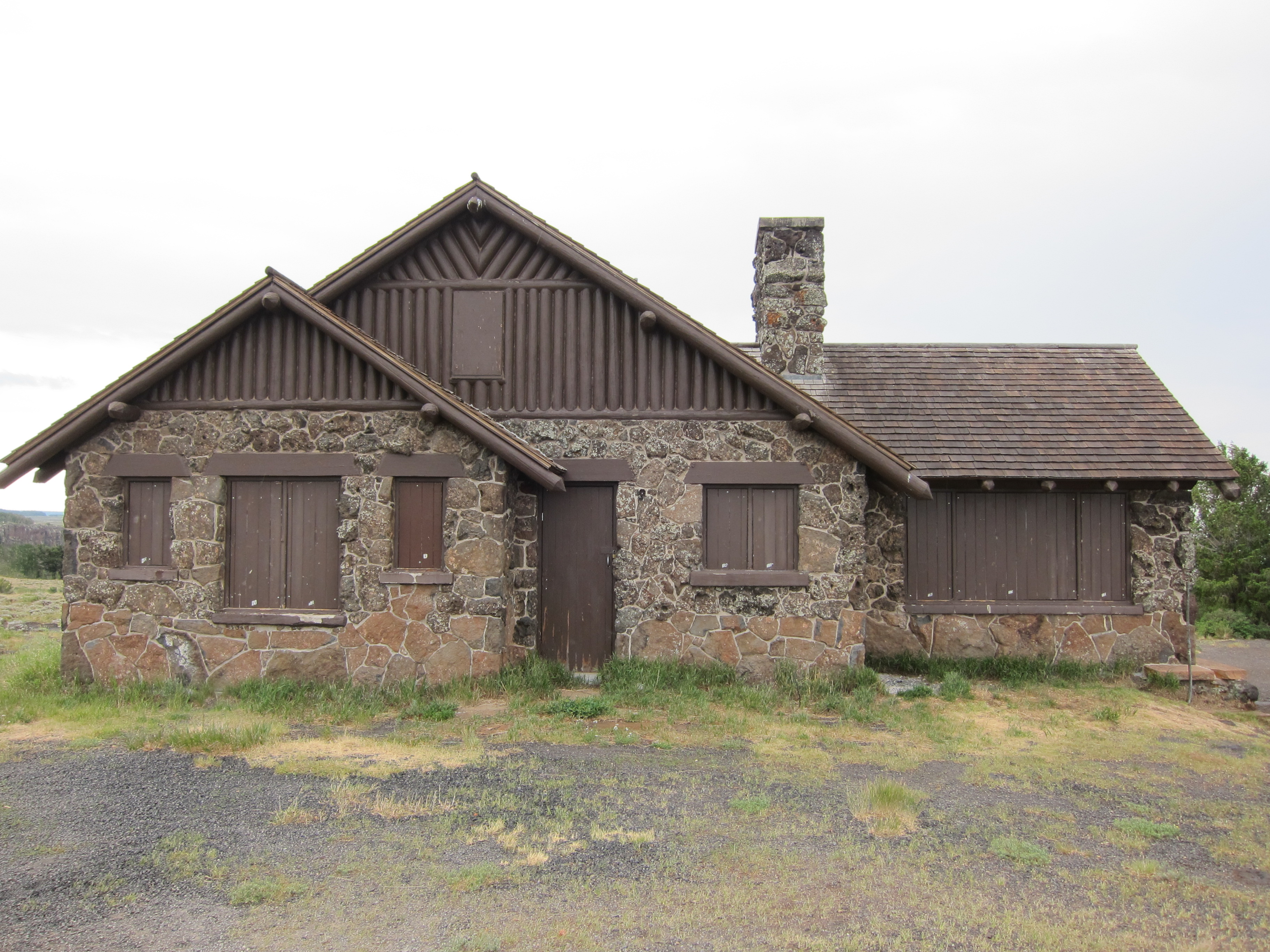
- Land's End Observatory, West side, July 2012

- Location within Colorado Location within the United States
- Nearest city: Whitewater, Colorado
- Coordinates: 39°1′30″N 108°13′25″W
- Area: 3.7 acres (1.5 ha)
- Architect: US Forest Service, et al; Anderson, Ivan
- Architectural style: Late 19th And Early 20th Century American Movements, rustic
- NRHP reference No.: 97000124
- Added to NRHP: February 28, 1997

Land's End Observatory is a ranger observatory on the rim of Grand Mesa in Colorado. It is accessible from the Grand Mesa Scenic and Historic Byway via Land's End Road, which is about half paved and half gravel. The observatory is about 10 miles west of Colorado State Highway 65. Land's End Road descends as an all-gravel road from the observatory down to U.S. Route 50, and the observatory can be accessed from that direction as well.

The observatory was built by the United States Forest Service and the Works Progress Administration in 1936-37, with some assistance from two Civilian Conservation Corps (CCC) side camps.

A large viewing area outside the building provides a panoramic view of western Colorado and eastern Utah. As of 2022, the observatory building itself is closed and boarded up.

From the U. S. Forest Service sign outside the building:

You have reached Land's End Observatory on Colorado's highest mesa, the Grand Mesa, 10,500 feet above sea level. Built in 1936-37 by the United States Forest Service and the Works Progress Administration (WPA), the observatory reflects the rustic style of architecture found in public buildings throughout the national parks and forests. It is marked by simplicity and craftsmanship, appearing to grow out of the earth rather than intrude upon it. Basalt stones were selected from the mesa and carefully fitted together to form the walls and terrace. Wood shingles were hand- sawn. The original, handcrafted woodwork can still be found inside. Most of the WPA workers who toiled here during the Great Depression are unknown, the observatory remains their legacy.

Land's End Road was once known as the Veterans' Road. When the Great Depression left many World War I veterans unemployed, President Roosevelt responded by opening the already created Civilian Conservation Corps (CCC) to include them. Thus, between June 1933 and May 1934, the 200 veterans who were brought to Land's End camp completed 9.2 miles of road. They were paid a dollar a day for their work. Ranging in age from thirty-three to fifty-five, the veterans were hailed as "a remarkable group of men, skilled in almost every imaginable trade." They lived in army tents roughly eleven miles below the mesa rim while clearing the brush for the road. The toughest part of the Land's Ends Road, from the Wild Road Picnic Area to the rim, was completed over the next two summers by Civil Service machine operators and a few civilian workers hired by the United States Forest Service. "Built the whole road," said the project engineer, "blasting and all, without injuries."

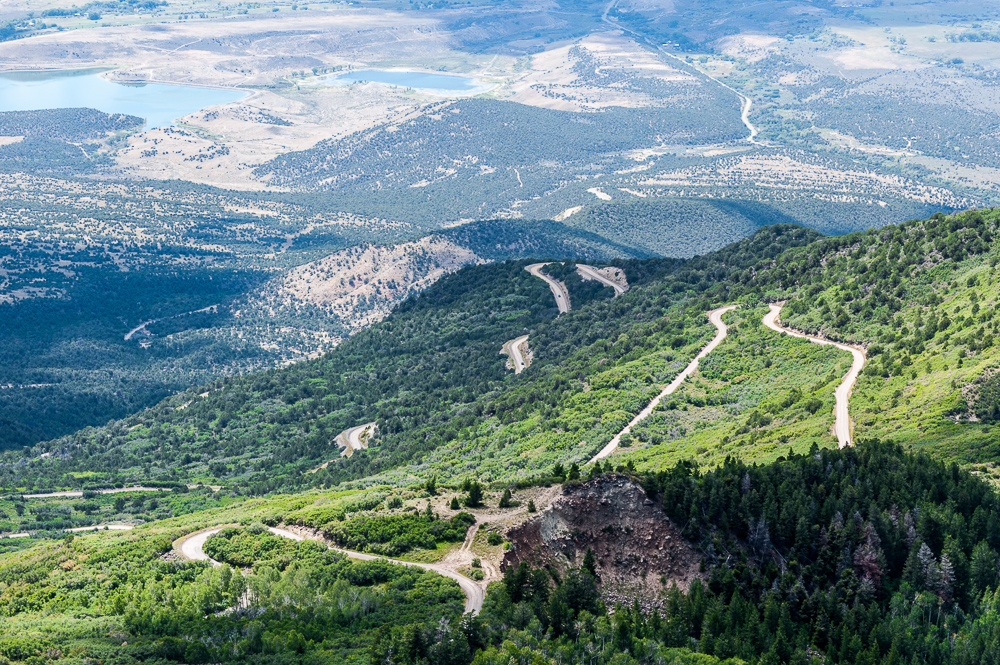
Land's End Road descending from Land's End Observatory to U. S. Route 50.

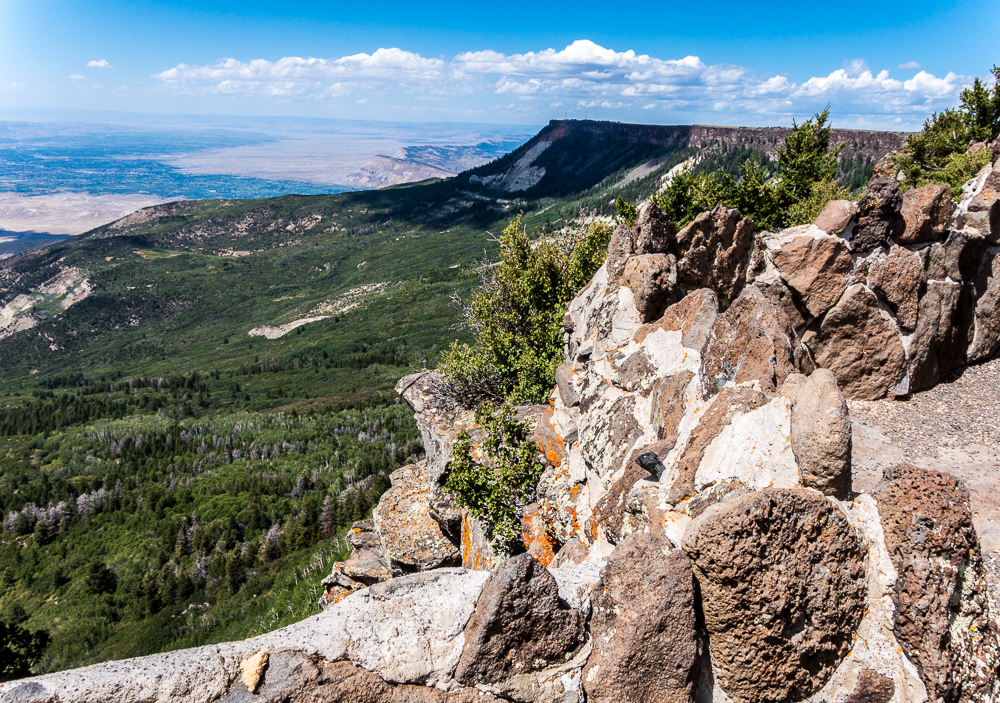
Land's End Observatory viewing area, looking towards the north.
