= Powderhorn Resort =

Ski area in Colorado, United States

Powderhorn Mountain Resort

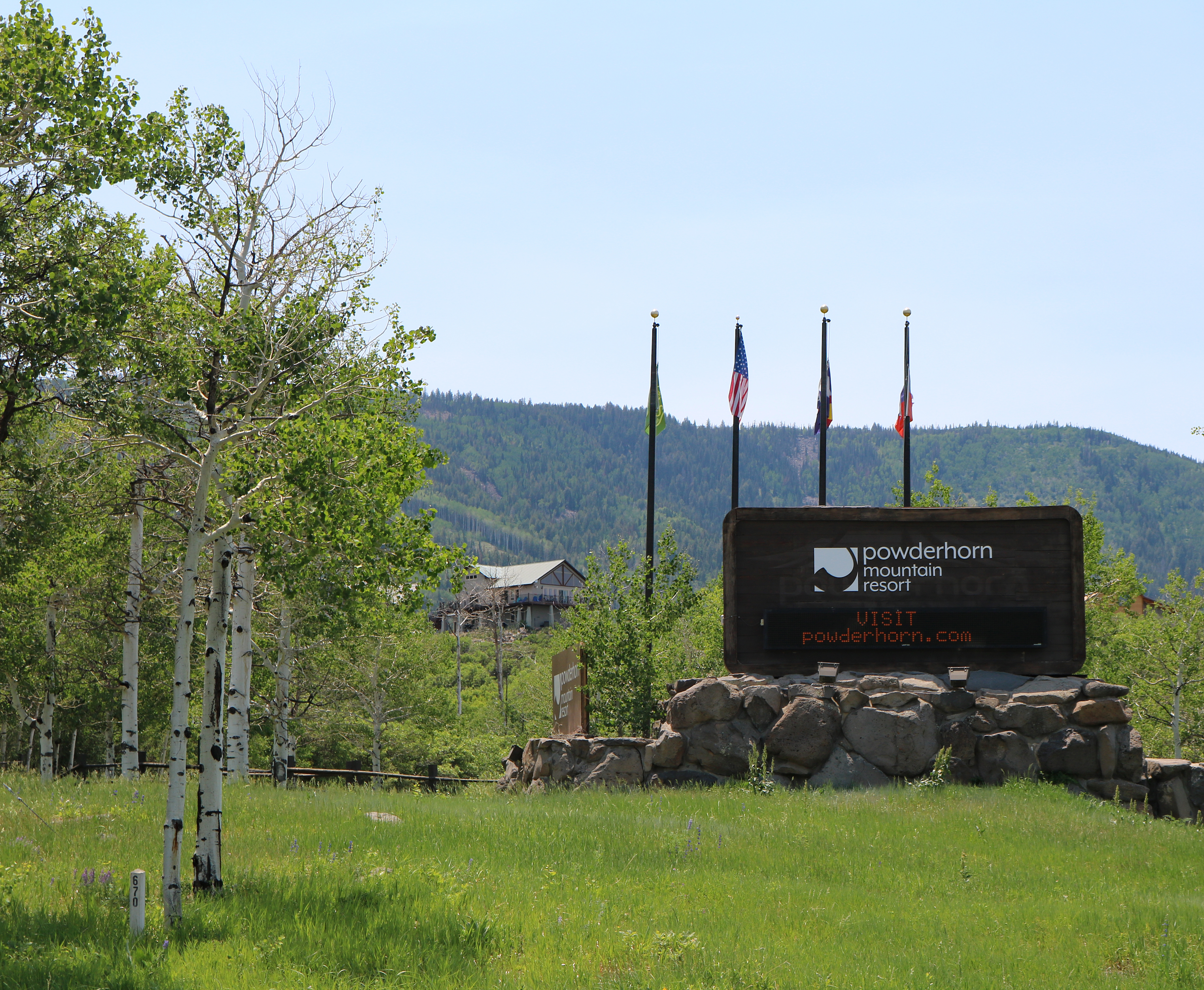
- The entrance of Powderhorn Resort in 2021

- Location in Colorado Powderhorn Mountain Resort (the United States)
- Location: Mesa County, Colorado, United States
- Nearest city: Grand Junction, Colorado
- Coordinates: 39°3′47″N 108°9′20″W
- Vertical: 1,650 ft (500 m)
- Top elevation: 9,850 feet (3,000 m)
- Base elevation: 8,200 ft (2,500 m)
- Skiable area: 1,600 acres (6.5 km^{2})
- Trails: 63 total 20% beginner 50% intermediate 30% advanced/expert
- Longest run: Tenderfoot/Lower Dude 1.8 miles long (2.9 kilometers)
- Lift system: 5 total (1 quad chair, 2 double chairs, 1 surface, 1 magic carpet)
- Terrain parks: 3
- Snowfall: 250 in/year
- Website: powderhorn.com

Powderhorn Mountain Resort is a ski resort located outside the community of Mesa, Colorado, 45 minutes east of Grand Junction. The resort is situated on the Grand Mesa.

== Skiing ==
Powderhorn sits on the side of the world's largest flattop mountain, the grand Mesa, allowing for views extending across the desert below. The climate at Powderhorn's high desert location— east of Grand Junction, Colorado and slightly north and east of Colorado National Monument— produces dry, powder snow. Powderhorn has a wide variety of terrain with a few long groomed runs as well as steeper tree runs and boulder fields full of jumps and cliffs.

== Statistics ==
=== Elevation ===
- Base Elevation: 8,200 ft (2,500 m)
- Summit Elevation: 9,850 ft (3,000 m)
- Vertical Drop: 1,650 ft (500 m)

=== Area ===
Skiable area: 1,600 acres (6.5 km^{2})

- 20% Beginner
- 50% Intermediate
- 30% Advanced

=== Weather and climate ===
- Average snowfall: 250 inches
- Snowmaking: 42 acres (170,000 m^{2}) (when needed)

=== Lifts ===
Lifts: 5

- 1 Quad - High Speed Detachable
- 2 Doubles
- 2 Surface

== History ==
In the 1940s, skiing began on top of Grand Mesa with a rope tow, and in the 1950s Mesa Creek Ski Area opened with 1 surface lift. Later, in 1966, Powderhorn Ski Area opened with a double chair and a surface lift two miles (3 km) below Mesa Creek Ski Area. In the 1970s another double chair and more terrain were added to the west side of Powderhorn to form the West End. In 1986, Powderhorn was sold to a Texas developer. After it was sold, the main double chair was replaced with a fixed grip quad and the surface lift was replaced with a double chair. Also in 1986, a wood deck was added to the daylodge and the parking lots were paved. Snowmaking also started in 1986. Two years later in 1988, condominium garages were replaced with patio units and the name was changed from Powderhorn Ski Area to Powderhorn Resort. In 1995, Powderhorn was sold to a local entrepreneur and the development of the Wildwood subdivision was begun. In 1998 Powderhorn was sold to owners, Steve Bailey and Dean Skalla. In 1999, 5,000 square feet (460 m^{2}) was added to the daylodge and a 5,000-square-foot (460 m^{2}) sundeck with a bridge direct to the lifts was added. The hotel/restaurant was renovated and renamed Inn at Wildwood and Wildwood Restaurant. The Wildwood subdivision was completed in 2000 and lot sales began. In 2002 the rooms at the Inn at Wildwood were renovated and enlarged. Two new trails and three new gladed runs were added in 2004 increasing the skiable area by 35 acres (140,000 m^{2}). In 2007, six miles (10 km) of mountain bike trails and an 18 hole disc golf course were added.

Bailey announced on June 1, 2011, that Powderhorn would be auctioned on August 4, 2011. Colorado ski resort mogul, Andy Daly, along with partners, Tom and Kent Gart, bought the resort for $1.4 million and immediately invested $800,000 (U.S.) into upgrades, including snowmaking machines, and rooms in the lodge. Daly was the ex-President of Vail Resorts, had had major involvement with Eldora, Copper, and Beaver Creek Resorts and, in 2010, was awarded the National Ski Areas Lifetime Achievement Award .

In June 2015, construction began on a new high-speed quad chairlift system, later named the Flat Top Flyer and other improvements. 2015 also saw the addition of three lift access summer mountain biking trails.

In 2019, Powderhorn opened a new outdoor bar, named the Umbrella bar. The Slopeside inn also expanded their hotel to include a small circle of 6 tiny homes, with more tiny homes to come.

In September 2025, Powderhorn announced plans to replace the West End lift, a fixed-grip two-seater that was installed in 1972. The replacement, a high-speed quad dubbed Wild West Express, is planned to be installed in the summer of 2026, and should be ready to enter service by December 2026.

== See also ==
- Grand Mesa Scenic and Historic Byway - the byway to access the Powderhorn Resort
