= Powder Horn Pond =

- Location within Massachusetts Location within the United States
- Location: Plymouth County, Massachusetts
- Coordinates: 41.9009306°N 70.6825462°W
- Type: lake

Powder Horn Pond is a lake in Plymouth County, Massachusetts.

Powder Horn Pond has an outline in the shape of a powderhorn, hence the name.
