= Grand Mesa National Forest =

U.S. National Forest in Colorado

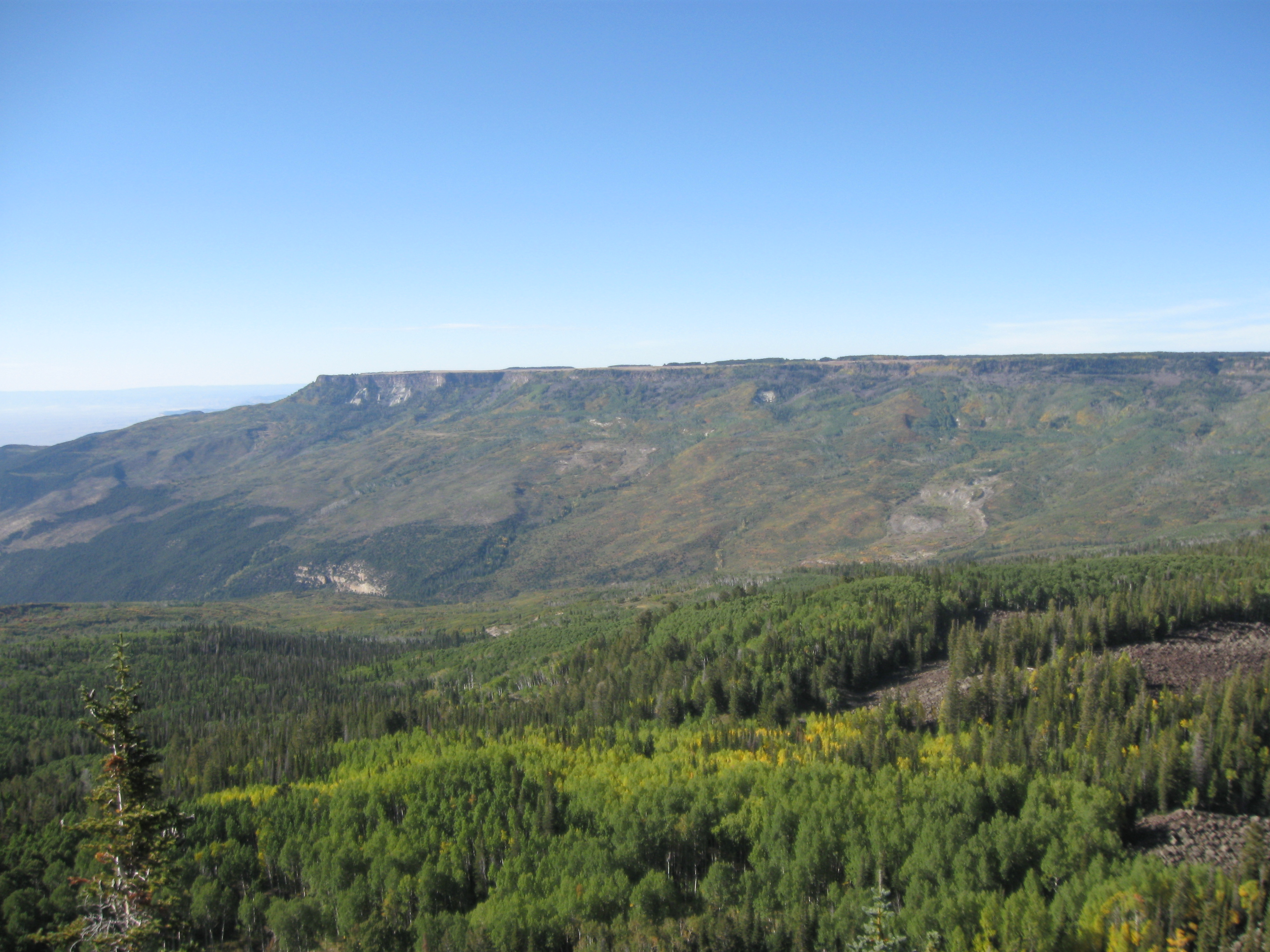

- Location within the United States
- Location: Delta, Garfield, and Mesa counties, Colorado, United States
- Nearest city: Grand Junction, Colorado
- Coordinates: 39.0668°N 107.8834°W
- Area: 346,555 acres (1,402.46 km^{2})
- Established: December 24, 1892
- Governing body: U.S. Forest Service
- Website: Grand Mesa National Forest

The Grand Mesa National Forest is a U.S. national forest in Mesa, Delta and Garfield Counties in Western Colorado. It borders the White River National Forest to the north and the Gunnison National Forest to the east. The forest covers most of Grand Mesa and the south part of Battlement Mesa. It has a total area of 346,555 acres (541.49 sq mi, or 1,402.46 km^{2}). It is managed by the United States Forest Service together with Gunnison National Forest and Uncompahgre National Forest from offices in Delta, Colorado. There are local ranger district offices located in Grand Junction.

Animals that inhabit this forest are elk, mule deer, Canadian lynx, black bears, pine marten, cougars, and bighorn sheep. Birdwatchers get a seasonal opportunity to view species of bird such bald eagles, boreal owls, golden eagles, Mexican spotted owls, common ravens, wild turkeys and peregrine falcons.

Originally called Battlement Mesa Forest Reserve, created by Benjamin Harrison on December 24, 1892, it was the third forest reserve created in United States. It is the largest flat top mountain in the world.

== Climate ==
Park Reservoir is a SNOTEL weather station on the Grand Mesa, located near Leon Peak (Colorado).

Climate data for Park Reservoir, Colorado, 1991–2020 normals: 9960ft (3036m)
Month	Jan	Feb	Mar	Apr	May	Jun	Jul	Aug	Sep	Oct	Nov	Dec	Year
Mean daily maximum °F (°C)	29.9 (−1.2)	31.9 (−0.1)	40.0 (4.4)	45.4 (7.4)	53.9 (12.2)	63.2 (17.3)	68.7 (20.4)	66.2 (19.0)	58.5 (14.7)	48.6 (9.2)	36.9 (2.7)	29.1 (−1.6)	47.7 (8.7)
Daily mean °F (°C)	16.8 (−8.4)	18.5 (−7.5)	25.4 (−3.7)	31.9 (−0.1)	40.6 (4.8)	49.4 (9.7)	55.5 (13.1)	53.8 (12.1)	46.3 (7.9)	36.7 (2.6)	24.8 (−4.0)	16.5 (−8.6)	34.7 (1.5)
Mean daily minimum °F (°C)	3.7 (−15.7)	5.0 (−15.0)	10.8 (−11.8)	18.1 (−7.7)	27.1 (−2.7)	35.5 (1.9)	42.3 (5.7)	41.2 (5.1)	34.5 (1.4)	25.1 (−3.8)	12.5 (−10.8)	4.1 (−15.5)	21.7 (−5.7)
Average precipitation inches (mm)	4.60 (117)	4.59 (117)	4.09 (104)	3.80 (97)	2.69 (68)	1.30 (33)	1.92 (49)	2.38 (60)	3.02 (77)	3.76 (96)	3.76 (96)	4.64 (118)	40.55 (1,032)
Average snowfall inches (cm)	69.6 (177)	45.5 (116)	65.2 (166)	36.8 (93)	24.3 (62)	1.2 (3.0)	0.0 (0.0)	0.0 (0.0)	6.3 (16)	16.7 (42)	45.2 (115)	60.1 (153)	370.9 (943)
Source 1: XMACIS2 (Park RSVR normals & Cedaredge 10.5 snowfall)
Source 2: NOAA (Precipitation)

== See also ==
- List of national forests of the United States
- Grand Mesa Scenic and Historic Byway, a Forest Service Byway
