= Mesa, Colorado =

Unincorporated community in Mesa County, CO, USA

- Unincorporated community
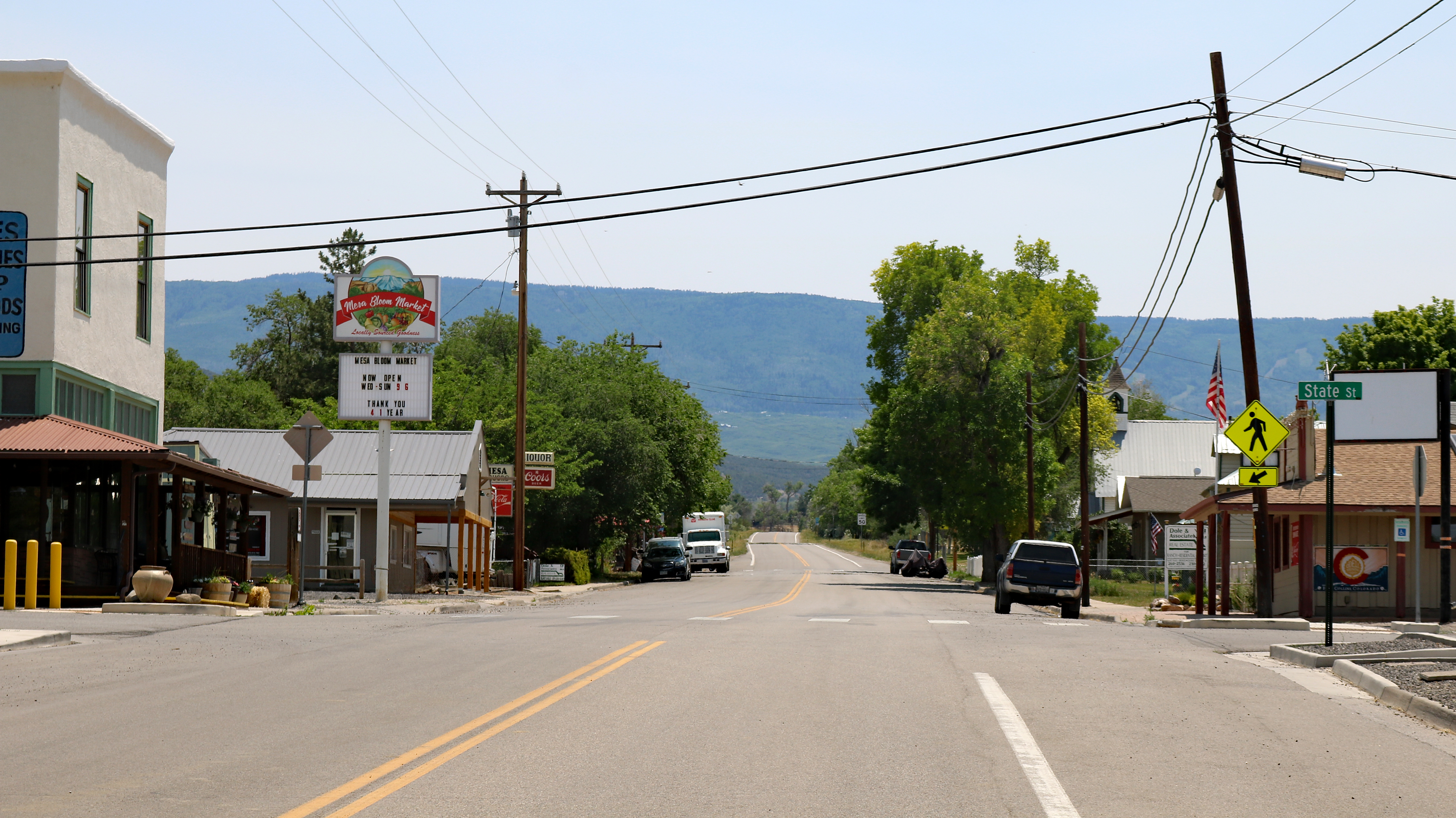
- Looking towards the Grand Mesa in Mesa on Highway 65

- Location within Colorado Location within the United States
- Coordinates: 39°09′59″N 108°08′20″W
- Country: United States
- State: Colorado
- County: Mesa
- Elevation: 5,643 ft (1,720 m)
- Time zone: UTC-7 (MST)
  - Summer (DST): UTC-6 (MDT)
- ZIP code: 81643
- Area code: 970
- GNIS feature ID: 174463

Mesa is an unincorporated community in Mesa County, Colorado, United States.

== Description ==
The Mesa Post Office has the ZIP Code 81643. Mesa is located on the north side of the Grand Mesa on state highway 65. in a geographic area known as Plateau Valley, and is under the Plateau Valley 50 District Public Schools.

The Powderhorn Resort is located just outside of the community.
