= Cedaredge, Colorado =

Home-rule town in Delta County, Colorado, USA

- Home rule town
- Town of Cedaredge
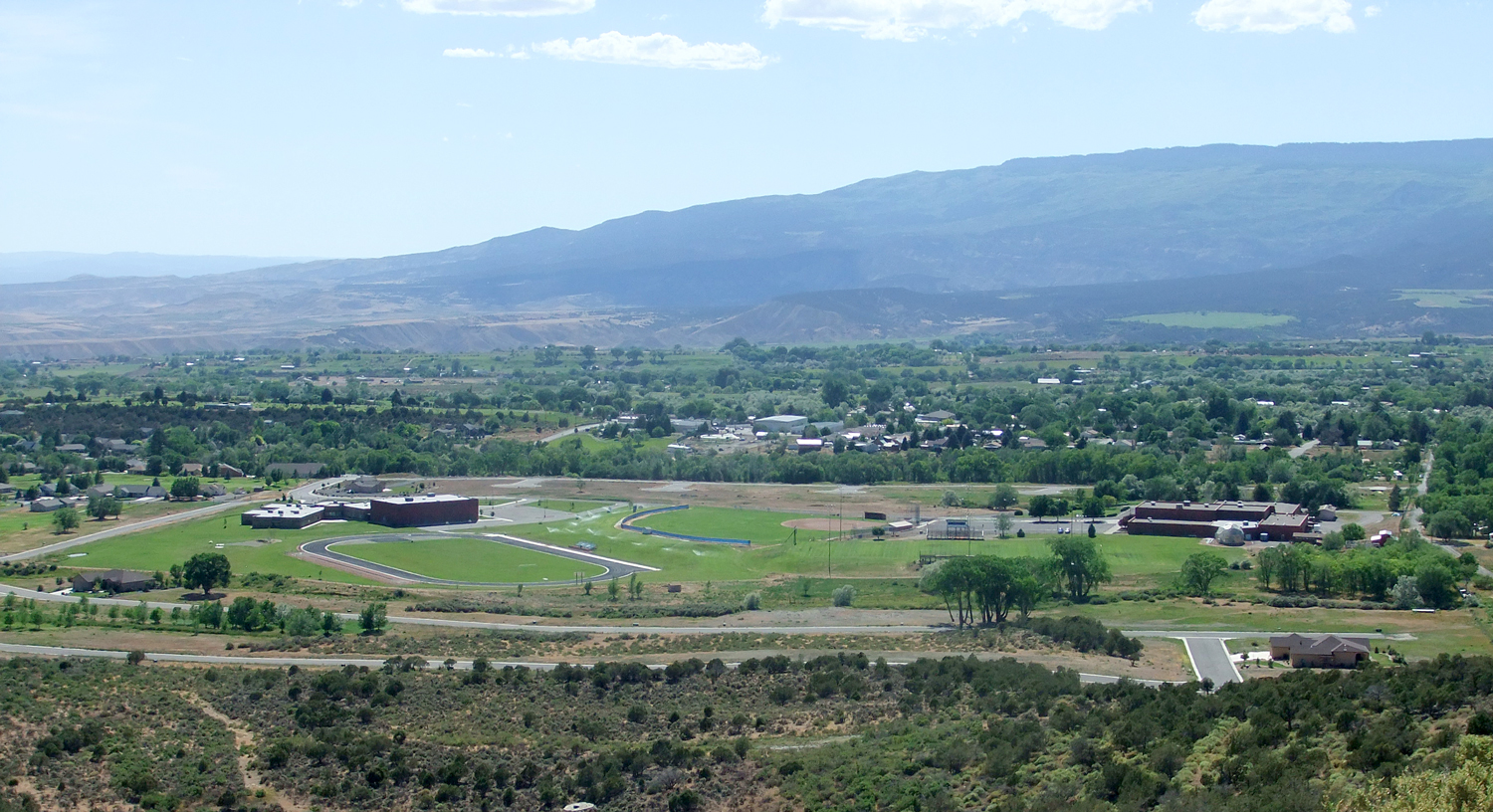
- Cedaredge as seen from Cedar Mesa.
- Nicknames: The Southern Gateway to the Grand Mesa.
- Location of the Town of Cedaredge in Delta County, Colorado
- Coordinates: 38°53′39″N 107°55′32″W
- Country: United States
- State: Colorado
- County: Delta
- Incorporated: May 2, 1907

Government
  - Type: Home rule town

Area
  - Total: 1.961 sq mi (5.078 km^{2})
  - Land: 1.961 sq mi (5.078 km^{2})
  - Water: 0 sq mi (0.000 km^{2})
- Elevation: 6,231 ft (1,899 m)

Population (2020)
  - Total: 2,279
  - Density: 1,162/sq mi (449/km^{2})
- Time zone: UTC−07:00 (MST)
  - Summer (DST): UTC−06:00 (MDT)
- ZIP code: 81413
- Area codes: 970/748
- GNIS town ID: 2413184
- FIPS code: 12635
- Website: Town of Cedaredge

Cedaredge is a home rule municipality located in Delta County, Colorado, United States. It is a small, agricultural community with 2,279 residents as of 2020, producing beef cattle, elk, apples, and peaches. Cedaredge is also home to several of the 19 wineries in Delta County, produced from the region's few basic vineyards. Located beneath the southern slopes of the Grand Mesa in the Surface Creek Valley, Cedaredge has an elevated vantage point that affords southern views of the San Juan Mountains, the Black Canyon of the Gunnison National Park, and the Coloradan communities of Delta, Olathe, and Montrose.

== History ==
=== Early history ===
Up until 1880 much of central and western Colorado was inhabited by the Ute Indians. Under the Act of June 15, 1880, the Utes ceded a large portion of their land to the United States, including the Surface Creek Valley. On September 1, 1881, the last band of Utes made their exodus from western Colorado to the northeastern part of Utah under escort of troops from Fort Crawford. Settlers soon began arriving, building homesteads, barns, businesses, and ranches. Much of the land was carved up into cattle ranches, fruit orchards, and fields of alfalfa and grass, but the most successful business is cattle ranching to the west of the town.

The Cedaredge, Colorado, post office opened on Dec 05, 1894, and the Town of Cedaredge was incorporated on May 2, 1907.

Cedaredge is on the Loewen database of possible sundown towns.

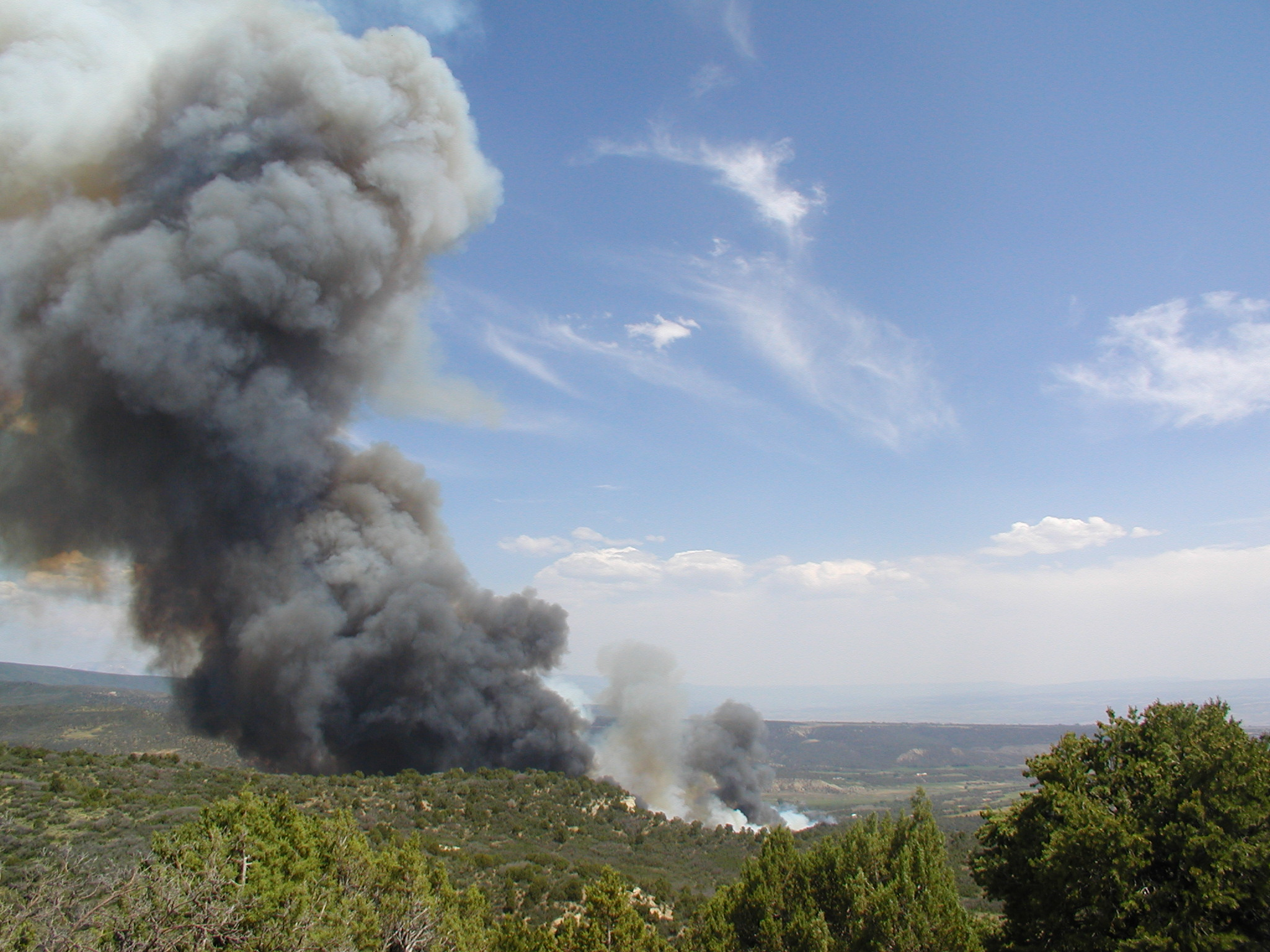
McGruder fire on 7-3-04 below Rollins Sandstone

On July 2, 2004, a lightning strike caught a tree on fire, smoldering until the following day when hot dry winds fanned the flames into a large wildfire. Dubbed the McGruder fire, it consumed an area of approximately 3,000 acres (12 km^{2}), of which 1,467 acres (5.94 km^{2}) was privately owned, the rest belonging to the Bureau of Land Management (BLM) and the United States Forest Service. The Cedaredge volunteer fire department (VFD) and regional firefighting services worked to suppress the fire, containing it with fire lines by July 11 with no homes or lives being lost.

Cedaredge celebrated its centennial in 2007.

== Geography ==
At the 2020 United States census, the town had a total area of 1,255 acres (5.078 km^{2}), all of it land.

=== Climate ===
The climate in Cedaredge, like much of the Grand Valley and Uncompahgre Valley, consists of mild, snowy winters; summers are hot and dry with scattered afternoon thunderstorms occurring often but delivering a small amount of total precipitation. Summers see typical highs of 92 and lows of 60, winters can see highs in the 50s and lows of 11 °F (−12 °C).

== Demographics ==
Historical population
Census	Pop.	Note	%±
1910	295		—
1920	455		54.2%
1930	463		1.8%
1940	556		20.1%
1950	574		3.2%
1960	549		−4.4%
1970	581		5.8%
1980	1,184		103.8%
1990	1,380		16.6%
2000	1,854		34.3%
2010	2,253		21.5%
2020	2,279		1.2%
U.S. Decennial Census

=== 2020 census ===
As of the 2020 census, Cedaredge had a population of 2,279. The median age was 57.2 years. 17.5% of residents were under the age of 18 and 37.3% of residents were 65 years of age or older. For every 100 females there were 89.0 males, and for every 100 females age 18 and over there were 87.9 males age 18 and over.

0.0% of residents lived in urban areas, while 100.0% lived in rural areas.

There were 1,108 households in Cedaredge, of which 19.4% had children under the age of 18 living in them. Of all households, 45.5% were married-couple households, 20.9% were households with a male householder and no spouse or partner present, and 29.8% were households with a female householder and no spouse or partner present. About 37.0% of all households were made up of individuals and 23.1% had someone living alone who was 65 years of age or older.

There were 1,200 housing units, of which 7.7% were vacant. The homeowner vacancy rate was 1.3% and the rental vacancy rate was 7.7%.

Racial composition as of the 2020 census
Race	Number	Percent
White	2,063	90.5%
Black or African American	10	0.4%
American Indian and Alaska Native	11	0.5%
Asian	12	0.5%
Native Hawaiian and Other Pacific Islander	3	0.1%
Some other race	55	2.4%
Two or more races	125	5.5%
Hispanic or Latino (of any race)	180	7.9%

=== 2010 census ===
As of the 2010 census, there were 2,253 people, 894 households, and 554 families residing in the town. The population density was 898.9 inhabitants per square mile (347.1/km^{2}). There were 1,000 housing units at an average density of 484.9 units per square mile (187.2 units/km^{2}). The racial makeup of the town was 96.01% White, 0.50% African American, 0.38% Native American, 0.43% Asian, 0.16% Pacific Islander, 0.59% from other races, and 2.37% from two or more races. Hispanic or Latino of any race were 5.39% of the population.

There were 894 households, out of which 20.8% had children under the age of 18 living with them, 51.6% were married couples living together, 7.3% had a female householder with no husband present, and 38.0% were non-families. 34.3% of all households were made up of individuals, and 21.1% had someone living alone who was 65 years of age or older. The average household size was 2.07 and the average family size was 2.61.

In the town, the population was spread out, with 18.8% under the age of 18, 5.5% from 18 to 24, 19.0% from 25 to 44, 25.1% from 45 to 64, and 31.6% who were 65 years of age or older. The median age was 51 years. For every 100 females, there were 88.2 males. For every 100 females age 18 and over, there were 85.3 males.

=== Income and poverty ===
The median income for a household in the town was $27,381, and the median income for a family was $35,052. Males had a median income of $32,426 versus $21,500 for females. The per capita income for the town was $20,059. About 10.0% of families and 14.9% of the population were below the poverty line, including 20.8% of those under age 18 and 10.4% of those age 65 or over. The median gross rent was $796 a month (2011), estimated rent burden was 34.6%.

== Sites of interest and events ==
=== AppleFest ===
In 1978 the "Cedaredge Harvest Festival" officially changed its name to "AppleFest." AppleFest is an annual celebration of apples, arts, music, and food held the first weekend in October in Cedaredge, Colorado. It is attended by around 15,000 visitors each year and typically over 200 food, arts and crafts vendors. The event features a classic car show, antique tractor show, and motorcycle show.

Musical guests feature folk, gospel, blues, country, rock, bluegrass and others with local, regional and national artists.

Since 2000, the festival has also included a chili cooking competition fundraiser organized by the Cedaredge VFD.

AppleFest 2014 marked the 37th Anniversary of the event.

=== Pioneer Town ===
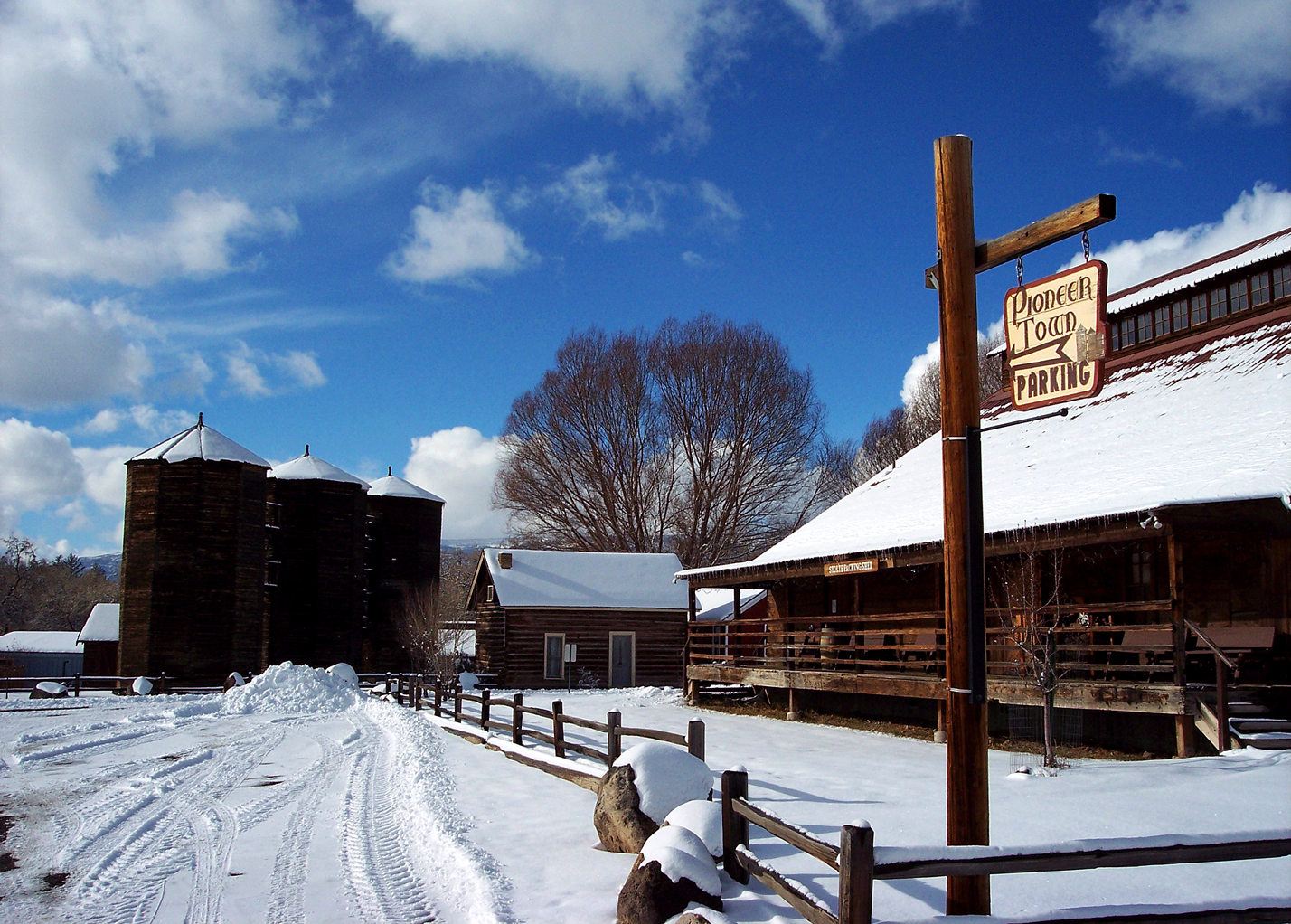
Pioneer Town entrance in Cedaredge, Colorado. Pictured are Stolte fruit packing shed and historic Bar-I grain silos.

Pioneer Town is a museum and historical village open from Memorial Day weekend through the first weekend in October. The centerpieces of Pioneer Town are the octagonal Bar-I Silos, the last remaining structures of the Bar-I Ranch, a cattle ranch that was established in the early 1880s. The museum's replicas of early 20th-century town buildings include a western saloon, marshall's office, barber shop, bank, clothing store, jail, creamery, and a working blacksmith's shop. It also includes Chapel of the Cross, a prairie-style chapel housing one of the world's largest digital organs, the Doll and Toy House, a museum of historical dolls and toys, and the Sutherland Indian Museum, housing one of Colorado's largest arrowhead displays.

=== Cedaredge Golf Club ===
Opened in the Spring of 1988, as the Deer Creek Village Golf Club, Cedaredge Golf Club is a public golf course in Cedaredge, Colorado. The golf course was completed in April 1992 and is located on what was part of the Bar-I Cattle Ranch hayfields of the early 1900s. This 18-hole course has four tee boxes per hole. Cedaredge Golf Club includes a driving range, clubhouse, and grill.

=== Grand Mesa Scenic and Historic Byway ===
The Grand Mesa Scenic and Historic Byway was approved by the Colorado Department of Transportation in 1991. It runs North from Cedaredge along Highway 65, to the top of the Grand Mesa at more than 10,000 feet (3,000 m). Grand Mesa visitors center has maps, books and other information about the area. The byway sneaks past Island Lake, one of more than 300 trout-filled lakes in Grand Mesa National Forest. On the north side of the Mesa are the towns of Mesa, Collbran, and Powderhorn Ski Resort. The byway continues along De Beque Canyon, with its colorful sandstone bluffs, and eventually meets Interstate 70 in the town of De Beque.

== Education ==
Education in the early days of Surface Creek Valley consisted of several one-room school houses scattered across the rural countryside. In 1920 the new Consolidated Cedaredge High School was constructed and regular bussing began in the area.

=== Cedaredge High School ===
Completed in 1982, the current Cedaredge High School has an enrollment of approximately 250 students. Unusual for a school of its size, it contains a technology lab, geodesic greenhouse, and an integrated cafeteria/auditorium. The mascot for its athletic teams is the Bruin and it competes in 1A football, and basketball, and in division 3A for volleyball, wrestling, baseball, swimming, tennis, and track. The Cedaredge High School Bruin Marching Band has won seven state marching titles in class 1A (2002, 2003, 2005, 2011, 2012, 2013, and 2014) The band set the record in 2011 for the smallest band (23 members) to win a state championship in Colorado and broke that record in 2012 with 17 members.

The (boys') football team won second place in the state championships in 1993, with the final being held at Cedaredge High School. After the team had not been to the state play-offs since 2002 and the 2008 season resulted in a win of 4 out of 10 games (no draws), the team was considered to have been "down the past several years" even by local media; the Denver Post criticized as its primary weakness the "lack of playing as a team." The school managed to hire Rich Stubler, who coached for 22 years in the Canadian Football League including being head coach for the Toronto Argonauts for 10 games in 2008, as new head coach starting in the off-season of 2009; Stubler explained his choice of working for a small town high school with needing a break. The team finished the season with Stubler with 2 wins out of 10 games (no draws). They hired Brandon Milholland the next year (2010) and he would lead the team to a state championship in 2012.

Roger Ellison, a 17-year-old senior, disappeared from the basement of the former Cedaredge High School on February 10, 1981. He has been neither seen nor heard from since, and authorities believe he was killed by someone he knew shortly after he vanished.

=== Cedaredge Middle School ===
Cedaredge Middle School occupied the original building of the Cedaredge Consolidated High School from the early 1980s until the current home for Cedaredge Middle School was built in 2004. It is located between the High School and Deer Creek Village golf course at the foot of Cedar Mesa.

=== Cedaredge Elementary School ===
The original school was built in 1959 and also known as Cedaredge Hunsicker Elementary School. A new school was completed on the south side of the road in 2012, and the parts of the old school on the north side of the road now serve the Surface Creek Vision Program.

=== Surface Creek Vision Program ===
Founded in 2003, the Surface Creek branch of the Delta County Vision program is a synthesis of homeschooling and public schooling philosophies.

=== Cedaredge Public Library ===
The current home for the Cedaredge Public Library was built in the 1990s.
