= Grand Mesa National Scenic Byway =

Colorado Scenic and Historic Byway

Coordinates: 39.0273°N 108.0320°W

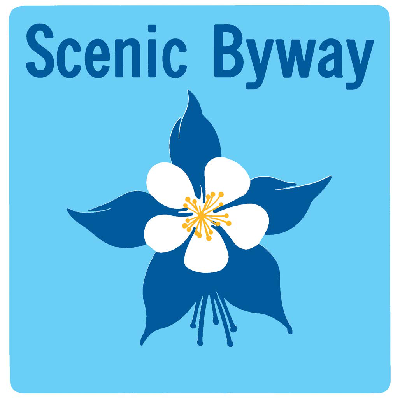
Grand Mesa National Scenic Byway

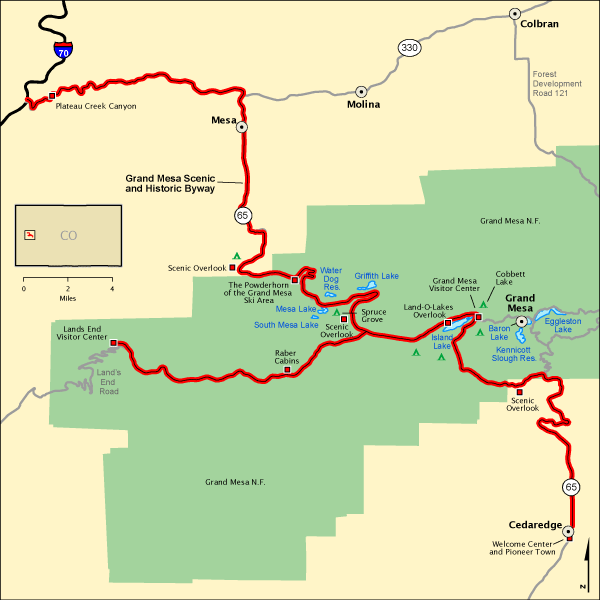

Route information
- Maintained by CDOT
- Length: 63 mi (101 km)
- Existed: 1991–present

Major junctions
- Southeast end: SH 65 Cedaredge
- Northwest end: SH 65 / I-70 Exit 49

Location
- Country: United States
- State: Colorado
- Counties: Delta and Mesa counties

Highway system
- Scenic Byways; National; National Forest; BLM; NPS; Colorado State Highway System; Interstate; US; State; Scenic

The Grand Mesa National Scenic Byway is a 63-mile (101 km) National Scenic Byway, National Forest Scenic Byway, and Colorado Scenic and Historic Byway located in Delta and Mesa counties, Colorado, USA. The byway traverses Grand Mesa, the most extensive flat-topped mountain on Earth, and reaches an elevation of 10,849 feet (3,307 m). The byway comprises Colorado State Highway 65 from Cedaredge to Interstate 70 Exit 49 and Forest Service Road 100 to the Land's End Observatory.

== Gallery ==
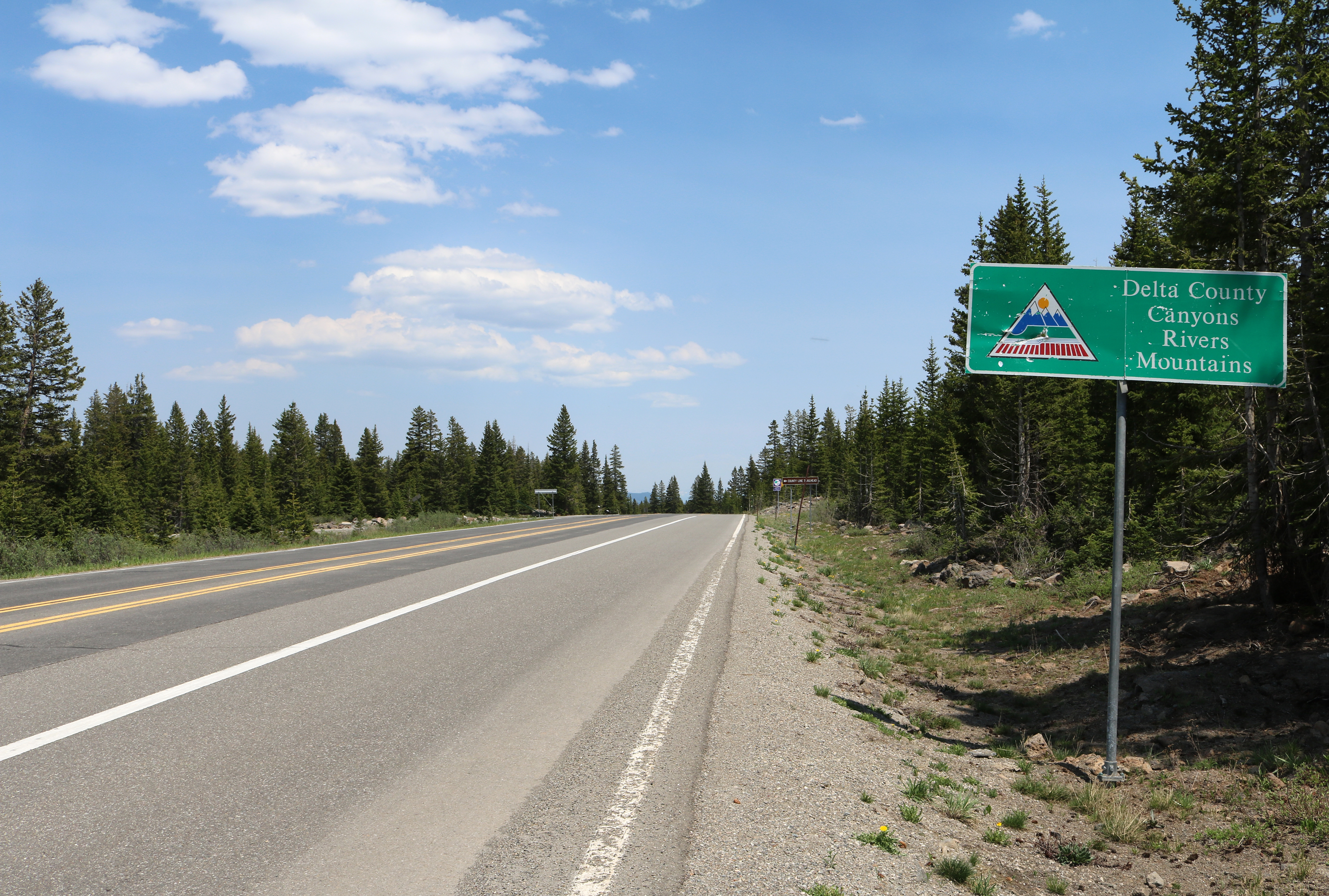
Grand Mesa Summit

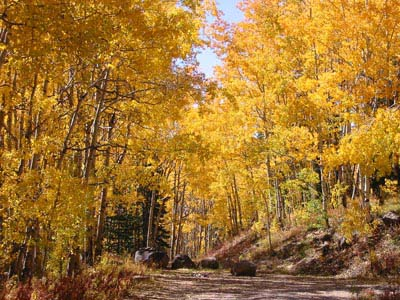
Aspen in autumn color change on the Grand Mesa National Scenic Byway

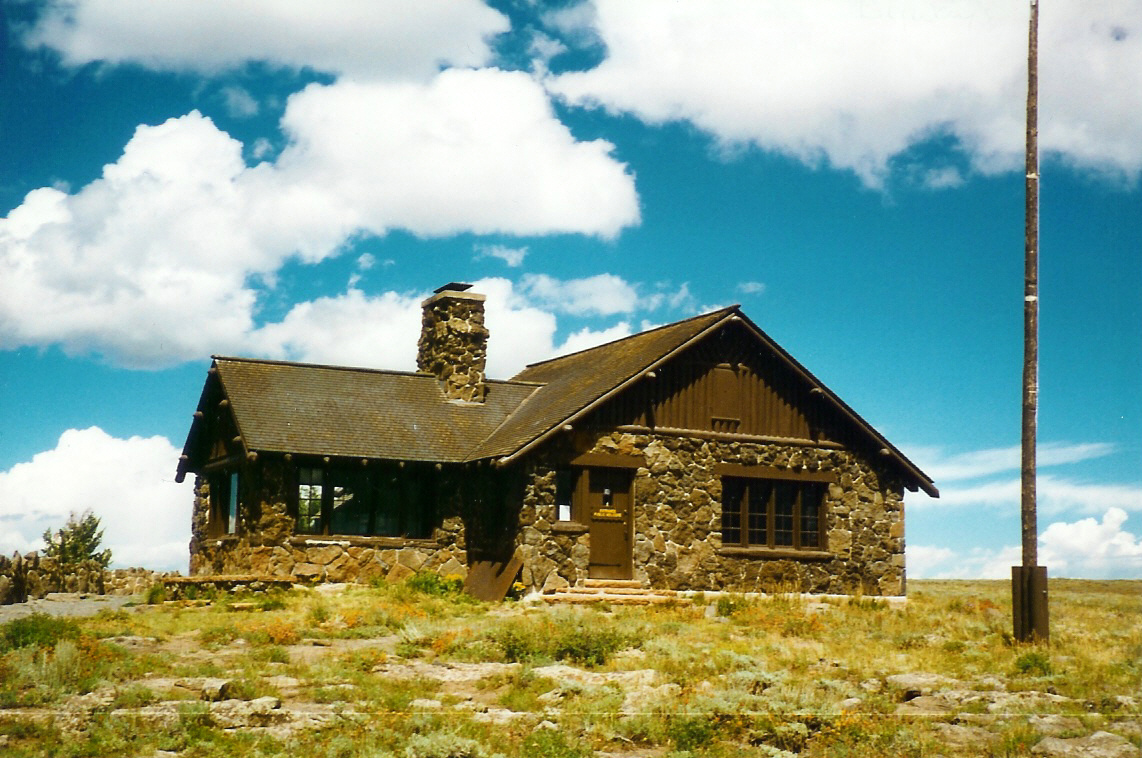
Land's End Observatory

== See also ==
- History Colorado
