= Grand Mesa =

Mountain in Colorado, US

Coordinates: 39°1′36″N 108°4′53″W

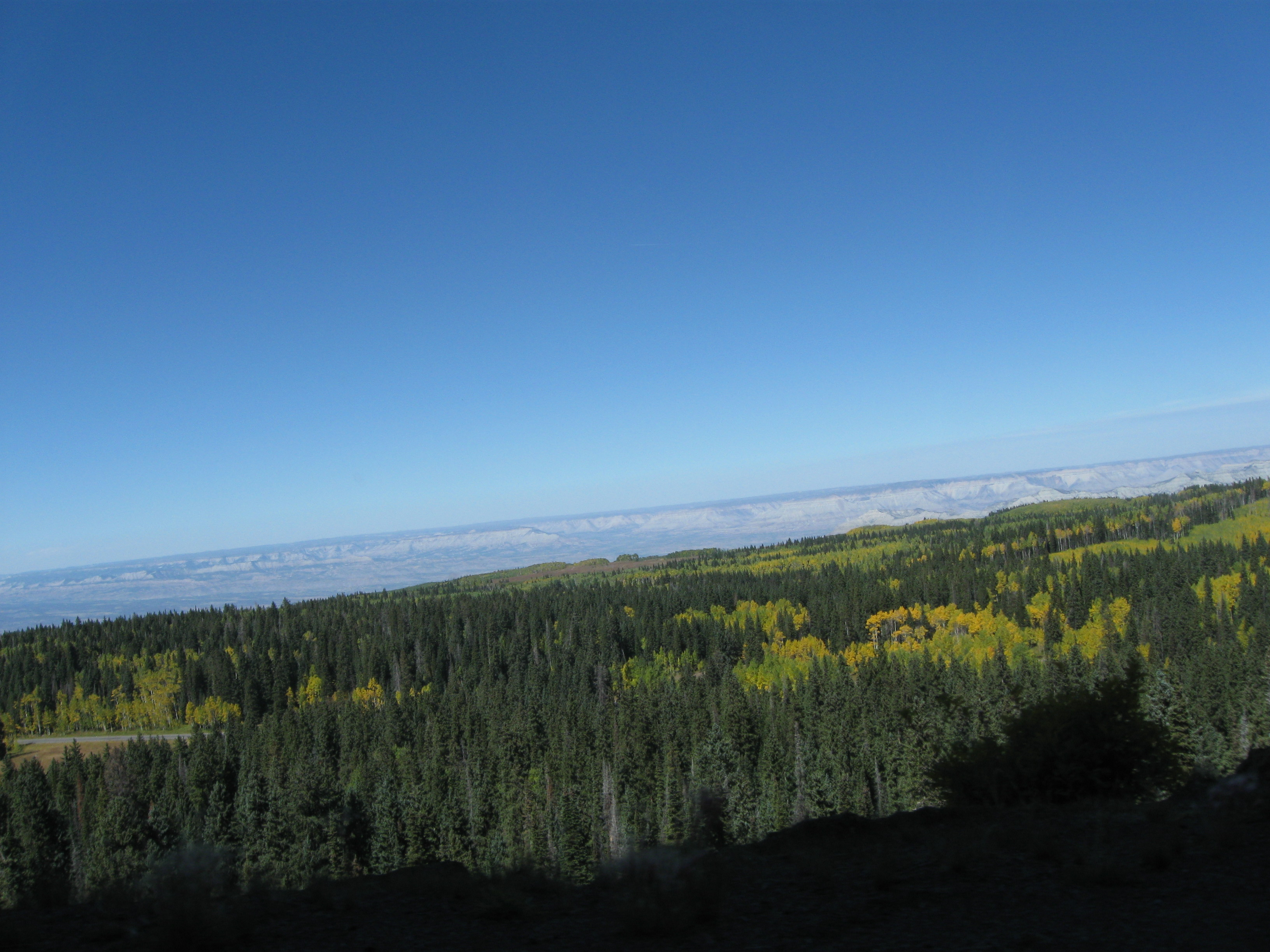
A view north across Grand Mesa National Forest.

The Grand Mesa is a large mesa in western Colorado in the United States. It is the largest flat-topped mountain in the world. It has an area of about 500 square miles (1,300 km^{2}) and stretches for about 40 miles (60 km) east of Grand Junction between the Colorado River and the Gunnison River, its tributary to the south. The north side of the mesa is drained largely by Plateau Creek, a smaller tributary of the Colorado. The west side is drained largely by Kannah Creek, which is received to the west by the lower Gunnison River. The mesa rises about 6,000 feet (1,800 m) above the surrounding river valleys, including the Grand Valley to the west. It reaches an elevation of about 11,000 feet (3,400 m) above sea level. Much of the mesa is within Grand Mesa National Forest. Over 300 lakes, including many reservoirs created and used for drinking and irrigation water, are scattered along the top of the formation. The Grand Mesa is flat in some areas, but quite rugged in others.

== Geology ==
The mesa is topped by a hard layer of volcanic basalt. This layer formed between about 10.9 and 9.6 million years ago, by the eruption of at least 27 separate lava flows from a vent in the Crag Crest area and probably other vents. This built up a maximum total thickness of more than 93 meters (310 feet) of basalt. The resistant basalt layer suppressed erosion compared to the surrounding sedimentary rock layers, which suffered rapid downcutting from the action of the Colorado and the Gunnison rivers. The top layer rests on a thick sequence of Eocene shale and sandstone known as the Green River and Wasatch Formations. These layers in turn rest on a Cretaceous layer known as the Mesaverde Group that forms a cliff about halfway up the side of the mesa. The lowest layers are yellow and gray Mancos Shale of late Cretaceous age. The shale continues outward into the surrounding valleys in the vicinity of the mesa, providing a soil base that is fertile for various kinds of agriculture, especially in the Gunnison Valley to the south.

The flows of the Grand Mesa volcanic field may have originally covered an area of 1,300 square kilometers (500 square miles), but erosion has reduced the intact flows to just 166 square kilometers (64 square miles).

The presence of rounded river cobbles beneath Grand Mesa's basalt cap confirms that it was originally a valley when the volcanic eruption occurred, indicating that the mesa is an example of topographic inversion. This means that what was once the lowest point in the landscape is now the highest, with the Colorado River having incised approximately 1,500 meters since the basalt flow, resulting in an average downcutting rate of about 140 meters per million years.

== Climate ==
Climate on Grand Mesa varies by elevation. Higher elevations tend to be cooler and receive more precipitation. The top of the mesa is more than 2 miles (3,220 m) above sea level, and experiences an alpine climate with substantial amounts of precipitation throughout the year. Because of the high altitude, summer days are mild, and temperatures drop sharply after sunset. Winter temperatures rarely rise above freezing, and can be extremely cold, often falling far below zero, especially at night. The top of the mesa is usually snow-free from late June through early October; however, the mesa receives heavy snowfall in the winter, rendering the forest service roads impassable. Accumulations of more than 300 inches (760 cm) of snow in the winter are typical. Surrounding areas with lower elevation are warmer and more arid throughout the year.

The following climate data is for Mesa Lakes Resort, located on the north slopes of the mesa at 9,800 feet (3,000 m) above sea level, which experiences a subalpine climate (Köppen Dfc), and the Bonham Reservoir, which experiences subalpine mediterranean climate (Köppen Dsc) bordering Dfc.

Climate data for Bonham Reservoir, Colorado, 1991–2020 normals, 1963-2020: 9852ft (3003m)
Month	Jan	Feb	Mar	Apr	May	Jun	Jul	Aug	Sep	Oct	Nov	Dec	Year
Record high °F (°C)	55 (13)	48 (9)	66 (19)	68 (20)	76 (24)	80 (27)	80 (27)	78 (26)	78 (26)	67 (19)	57 (14)	58 (14)	80 (27)
Mean maximum °F (°C)	40.8 (4.9)	40.0 (4.4)	47.1 (8.4)	52.5 (11.4)	62.5 (16.9)	74.3 (23.5)	75.8 (24.3)	71.9 (22.2)	67.6 (19.8)	59.3 (15.2)	49.2 (9.6)	41.6 (5.3)	76.1 (24.5)
Mean daily maximum °F (°C)	25.9 (−3.4)	27.0 (−2.8)	33.8 (1.0)	39.9 (4.4)	49.3 (9.6)	62.2 (16.8)	67.7 (19.8)	63.6 (17.6)	57.0 (13.9)	45.2 (7.3)	33.8 (1.0)	25.8 (−3.4)	44.3 (6.8)
Daily mean °F (°C)	16.1 (−8.8)	15.4 (−9.2)	23.1 (−4.9)	28.7 (−1.8)	38.1 (3.4)	49.3 (9.6)	55.0 (12.8)	51.9 (11.1)	45.7 (7.6)	34.7 (1.5)	23.8 (−4.6)	15.2 (−9.3)	33.1 (0.6)
Mean daily minimum °F (°C)	6.3 (−14.3)	3.7 (−15.7)	12.3 (−10.9)	17.4 (−8.1)	26.8 (−2.9)	36.5 (2.5)	42.2 (5.7)	40.2 (4.6)	34.4 (1.3)	24.2 (−4.3)	13.8 (−10.1)	4.6 (−15.2)	21.9 (−5.6)
Mean minimum °F (°C)	−15.0 (−26.1)	−16.2 (−26.8)	−10.3 (−23.5)	−0.1 (−17.8)	12.3 (−10.9)	26.3 (−3.2)	35.4 (1.9)	32.5 (0.3)	21.6 (−5.8)	6.6 (−14.1)	−7.8 (−22.1)	−17.9 (−27.7)	−21.5 (−29.7)
Record low °F (°C)	−36 (−38)	−33 (−36)	−24 (−31)	−16 (−27)	−3 (−19)	19 (−7)	27 (−3)	19 (−7)	11 (−12)	−14 (−26)	−26 (−32)	−30 (−34)	−36 (−38)
Average precipitation inches (mm)	2.87 (73)	3.58 (91)	3.07 (78)	3.01 (76)	2.13 (54)	1.11 (28)	2.04 (52)	2.24 (57)	2.45 (62)	2.60 (66)	2.45 (62)	3.81 (97)	31.36 (796)
Average snowfall inches (cm)	29.9 (76)	30.3 (77)	27.7 (70)	20.7 (53)	11.1 (28)	0.4 (1.0)	0.0 (0.0)	0.0 (0.0)	2.8 (7.1)	14.2 (36)	19.3 (49)	29.3 (74)	185.7 (471.1)
Source 1: NOAA
Source 2: XMACIS (2002-2020 snow, monthly max/mins & records)

Climate data for Mesa Lakes Resort, Colorado (1971–1979)
Month	Jan	Feb	Mar	Apr	May	Jun	Jul	Aug	Sep	Oct	Nov	Dec	Year
Record high °F (°C)	47 (8)	47 (8)	56 (13)	62 (17)	77 (25)	78 (26)	80 (27)	77 (25)	75 (24)	63 (17)	55 (13)	48 (9)	80 (27)
Mean daily maximum °F (°C)	27.9 (−2.3)	30.9 (−0.6)	34.5 (1.4)	41.0 (5.0)	52.6 (11.4)	64.1 (17.8)	69.2 (20.7)	66.6 (19.2)	59.0 (15.0)	49.0 (9.4)	34.8 (1.6)	28.9 (−1.7)	46.7 (8.2)
Mean daily minimum °F (°C)	3.4 (−15.9)	6.1 (−14.4)	11.3 (−11.5)	17.4 (−8.1)	28.1 (−2.2)	36.9 (2.7)	43.0 (6.1)	41.8 (5.4)	35.5 (1.9)	26.2 (−3.2)	14.0 (−10.0)	4.6 (−15.2)	22.5 (−5.3)
Record low °F (°C)	−35 (−37)	−25 (−32)	−18 (−28)	−13 (−25)	10 (−12)	16 (−9)	31 (−1)	28 (−2)	21 (−6)	−4 (−20)	−18 (−28)	−28 (−33)	−35 (−37)
Average precipitation inches (mm)	2.54 (65)	2.09 (53)	2.60 (66)	2.66 (68)	1.81 (46)	1.52 (39)	2.11 (54)	1.64 (42)	1.87 (47)	2.91 (74)	2.56 (65)	2.39 (61)	26.71 (678)
Average snowfall inches (cm)	67.2 (171)	50.7 (129)	60.7 (154)	52.0 (132)	17.4 (44)	3.4 (8.6)	0 (0)	0 (0)	1.4 (3.6)	23.4 (59)	46.0 (117)	58.2 (148)	380.5 (966)
Source: The Western Regional Climate Center

== Geography ==
The mesa is traversed by the Grand Mesa Scenic and Historic Byway, which includes SH 65, between the town of Mesa on the north and the town of Cedaredge on the south. The route over the mesa provides a dramatic contrast in landscape, climate and vegetation. On the north side, the road climbs the steep terrain near the Powderhorn Resort ski area. The forested top of the mesa remains snowbound much later in the spring than the surrounding valleys, and is a popular location for cross-country skiing and snowmobiling.

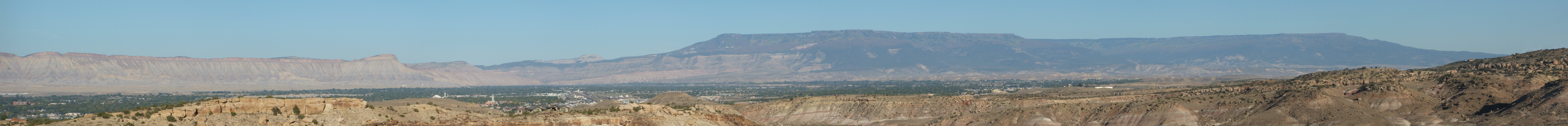
A panoramic view of the Grand Mesa, with Mt. Garfield and the Book Cliffs visible on the left
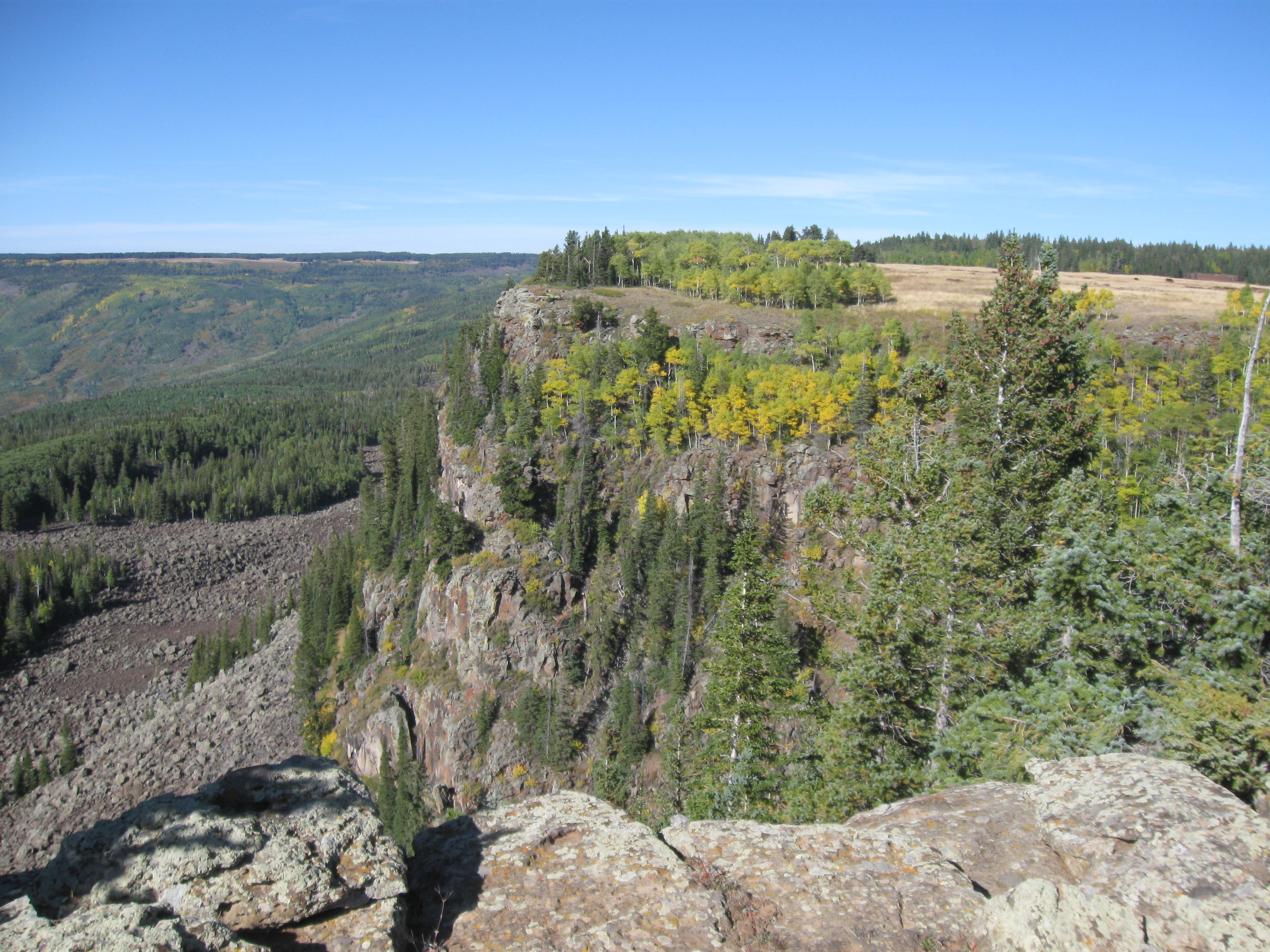
Cliff edge on western face of the mesa.

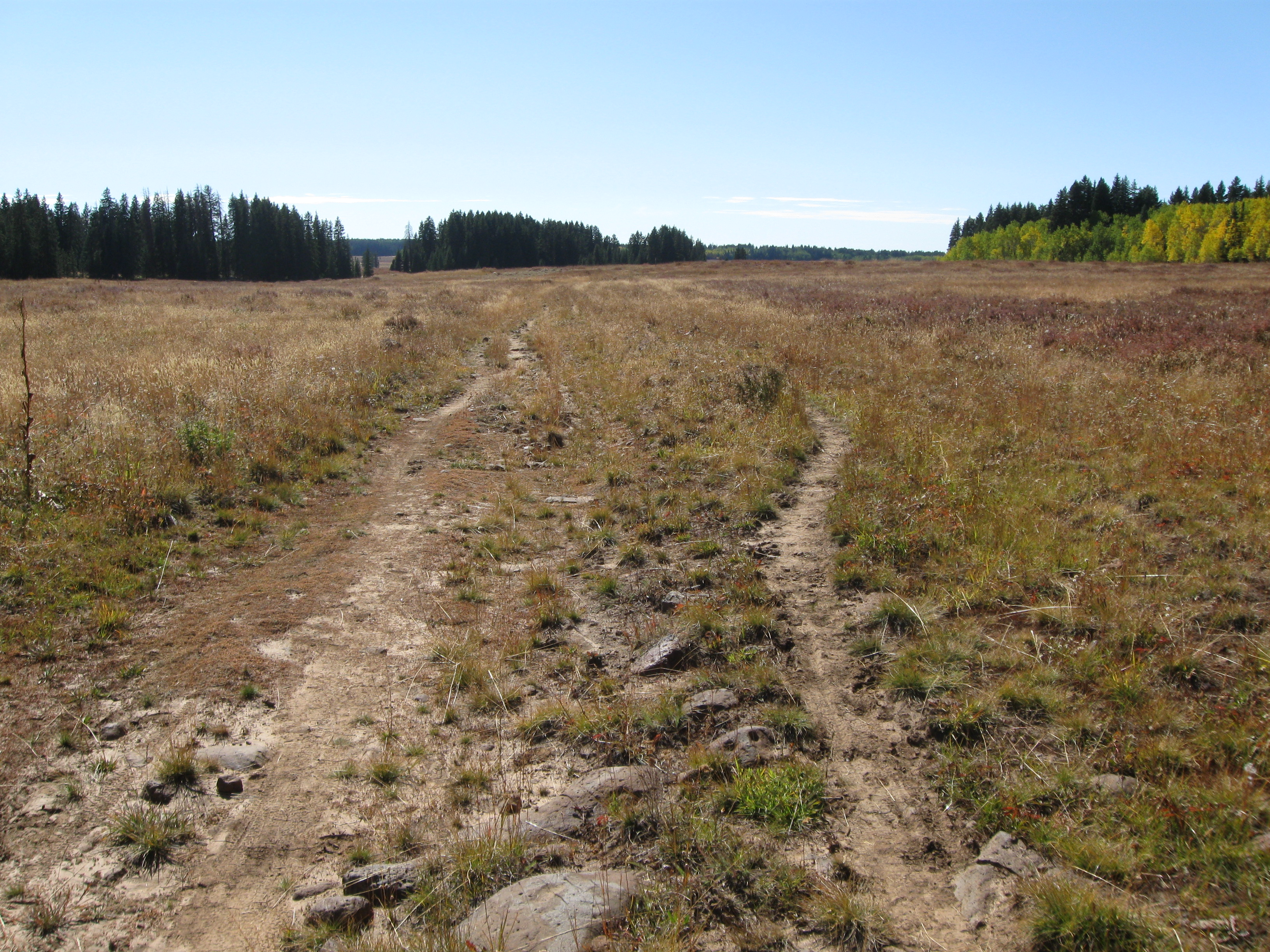
Typical landscape on top of the mesa.

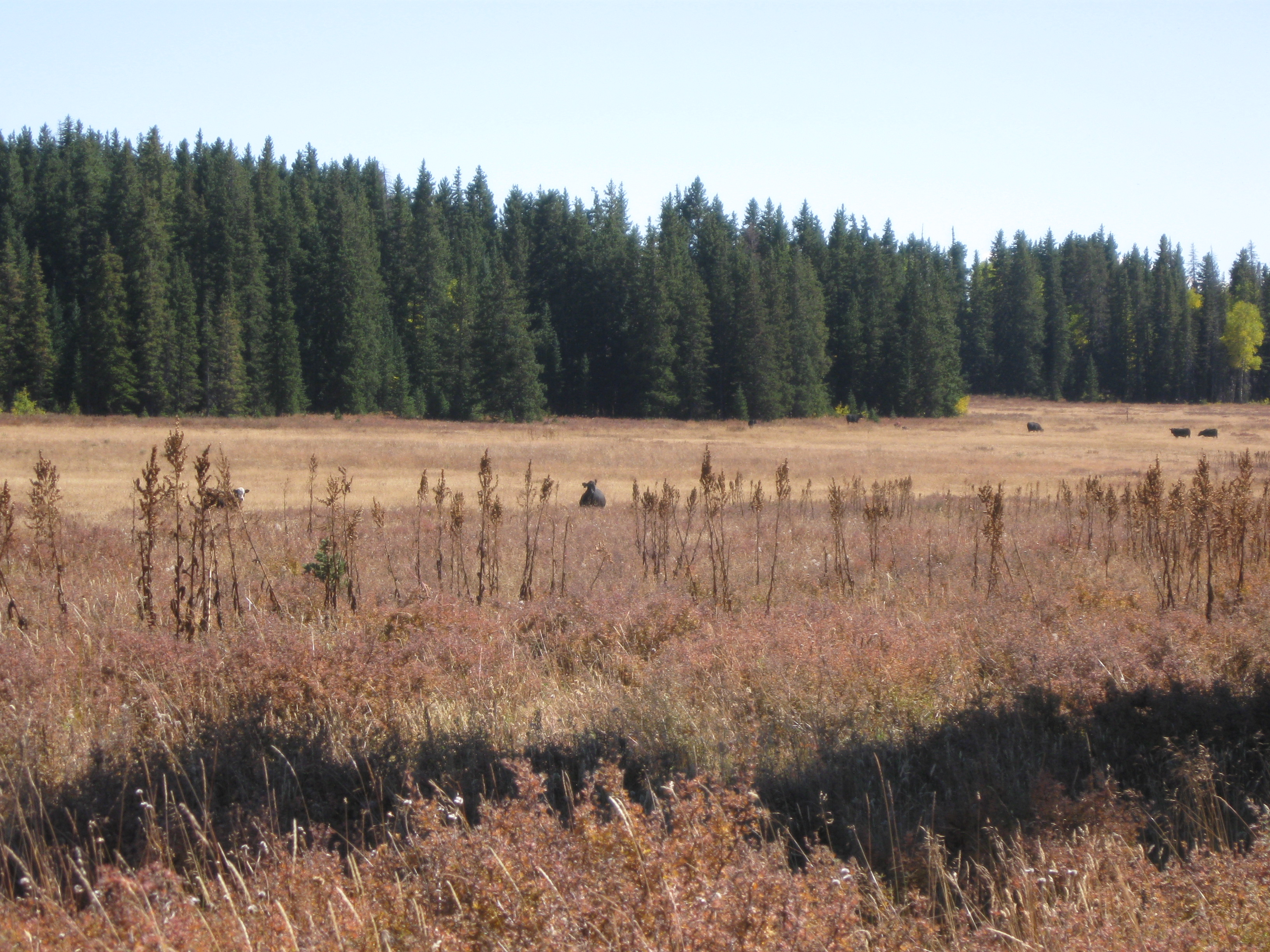
In the summer, cattle graze atop the mesa.

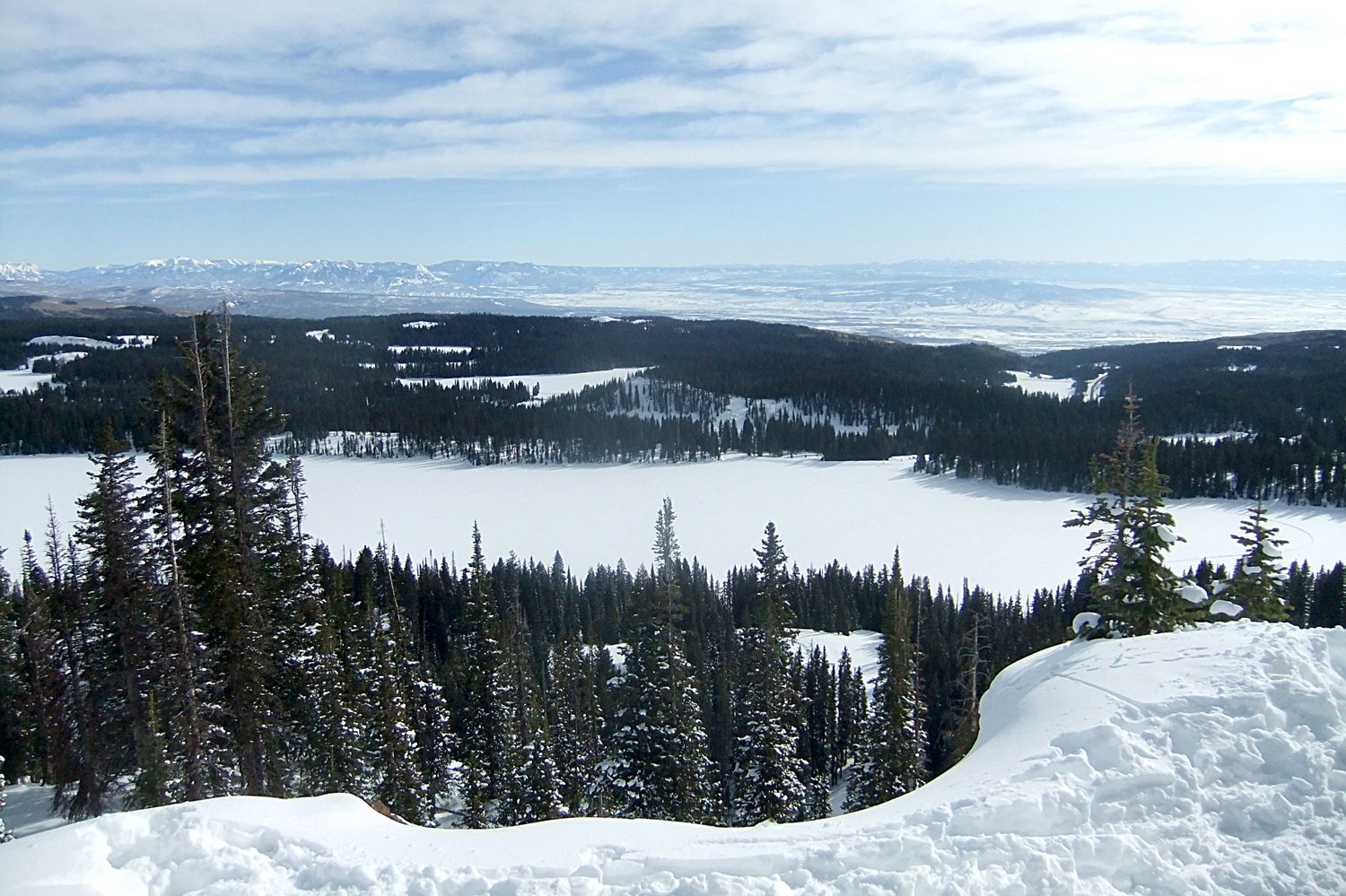
View from Grand Mesa looking south towards Island Lake and the San Juan Mountains.

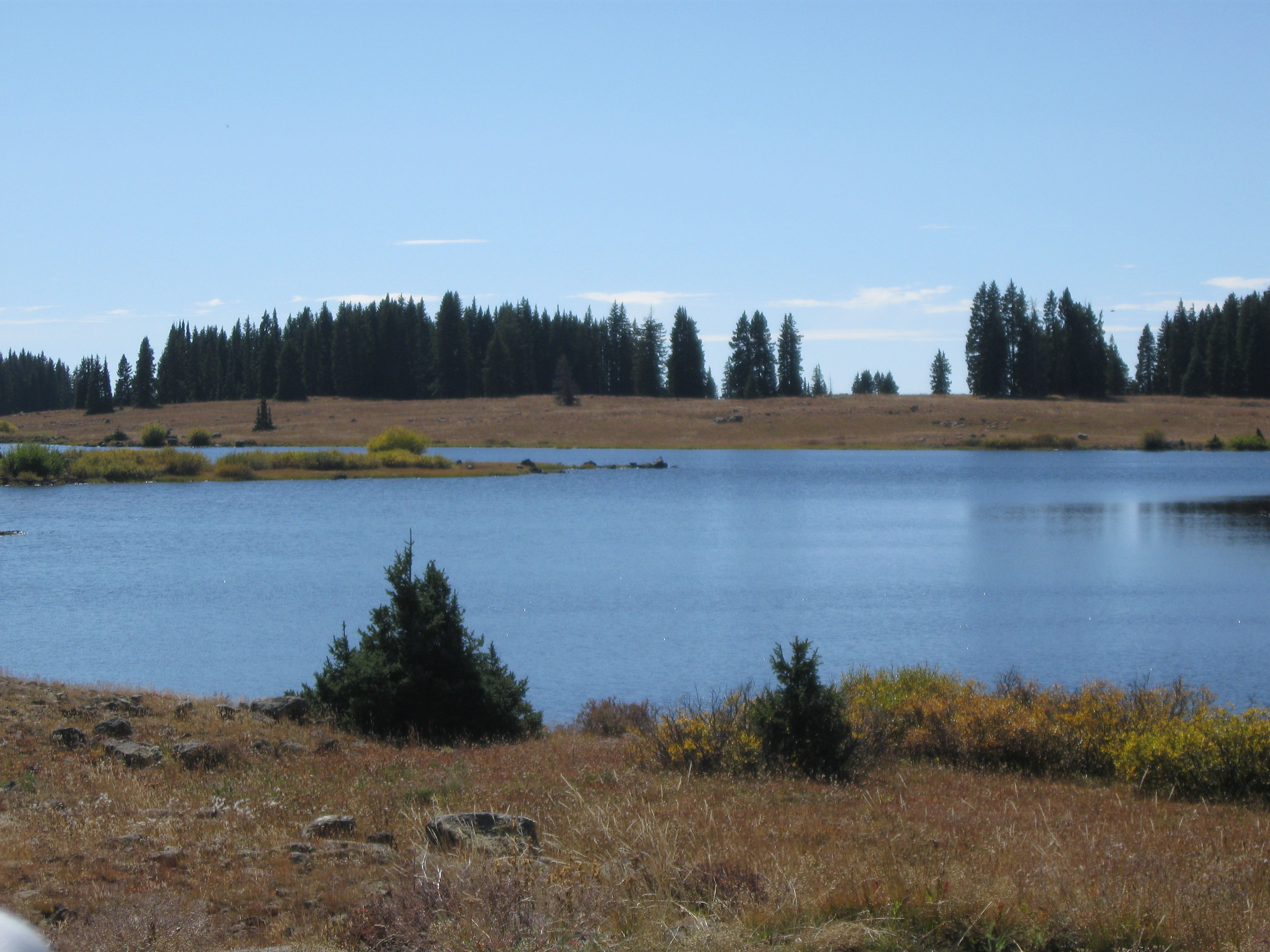
Numerous ponds and small lakes dot the top of the Mesa.

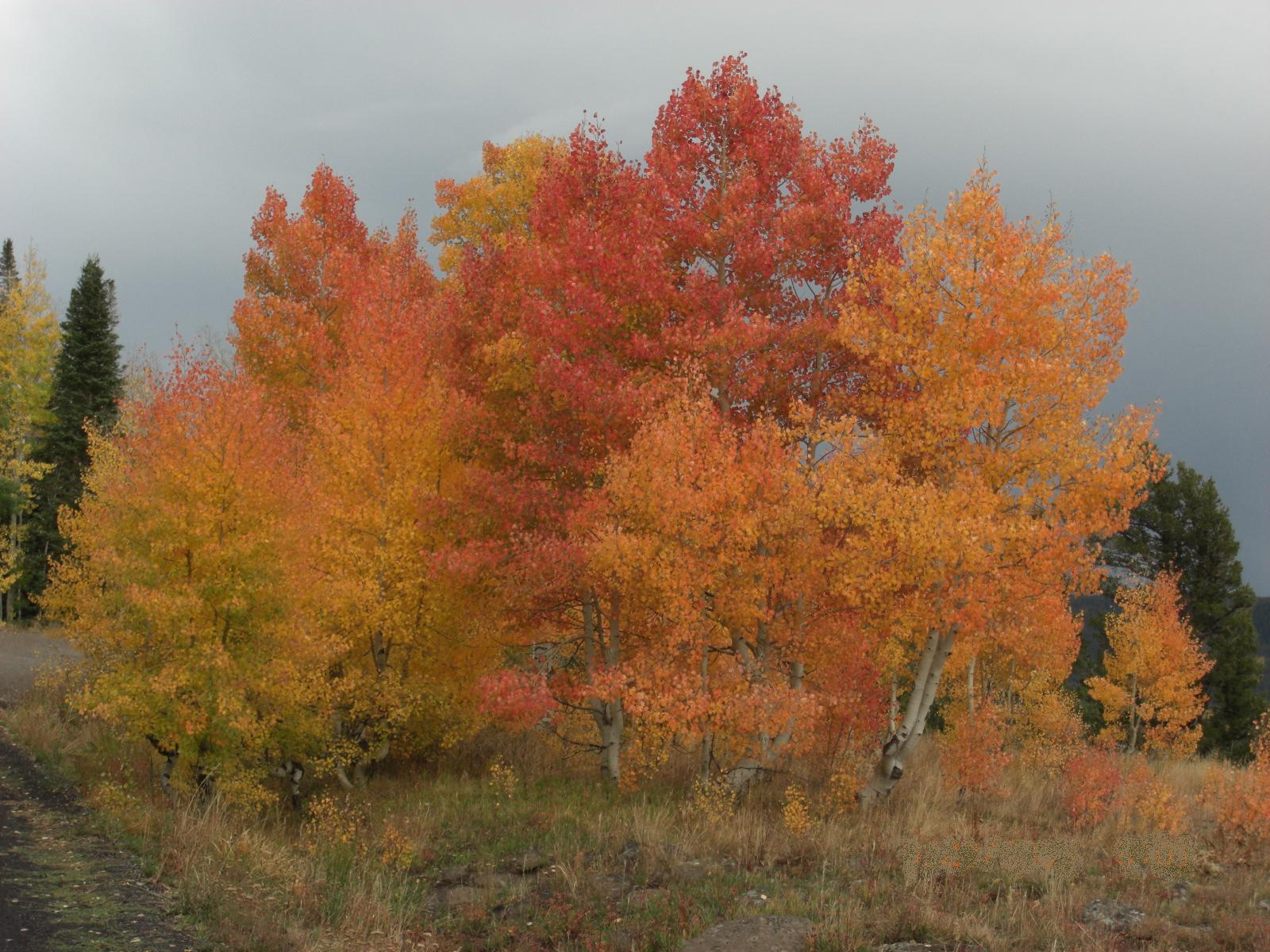
Fall colors atop the mesa.

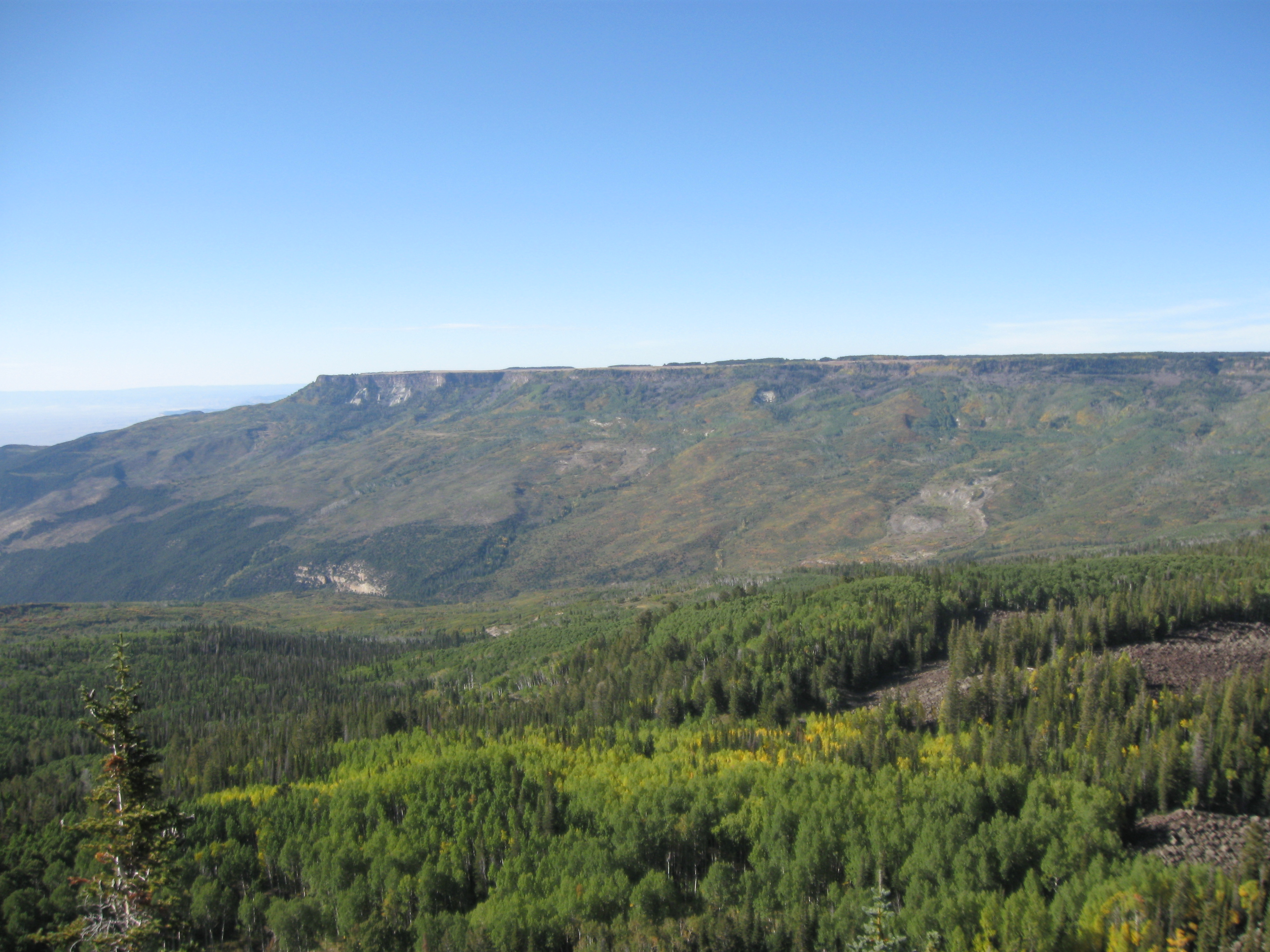
Western edge of the mesa.

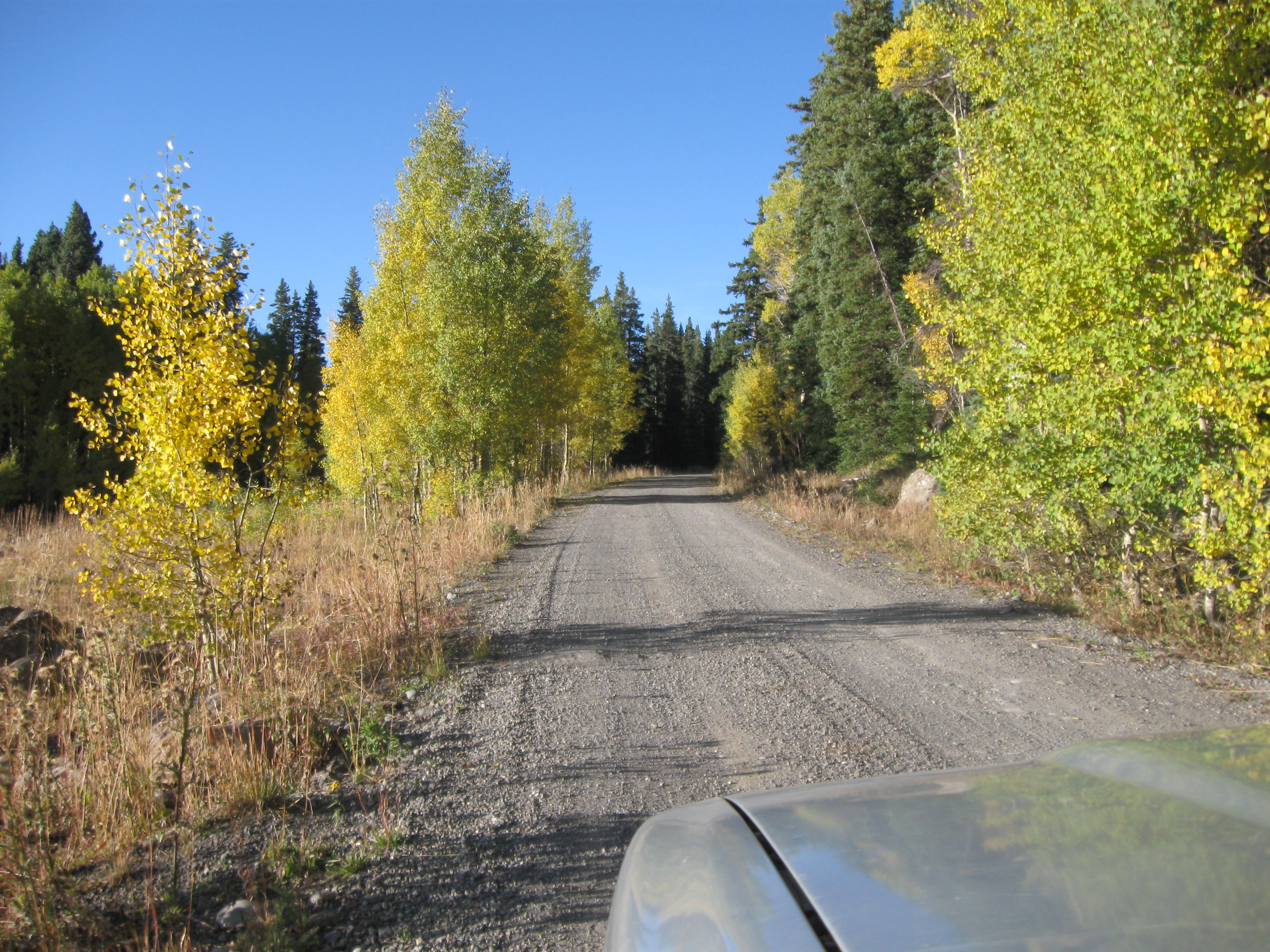
Typical Forest Service road atop the mesa.

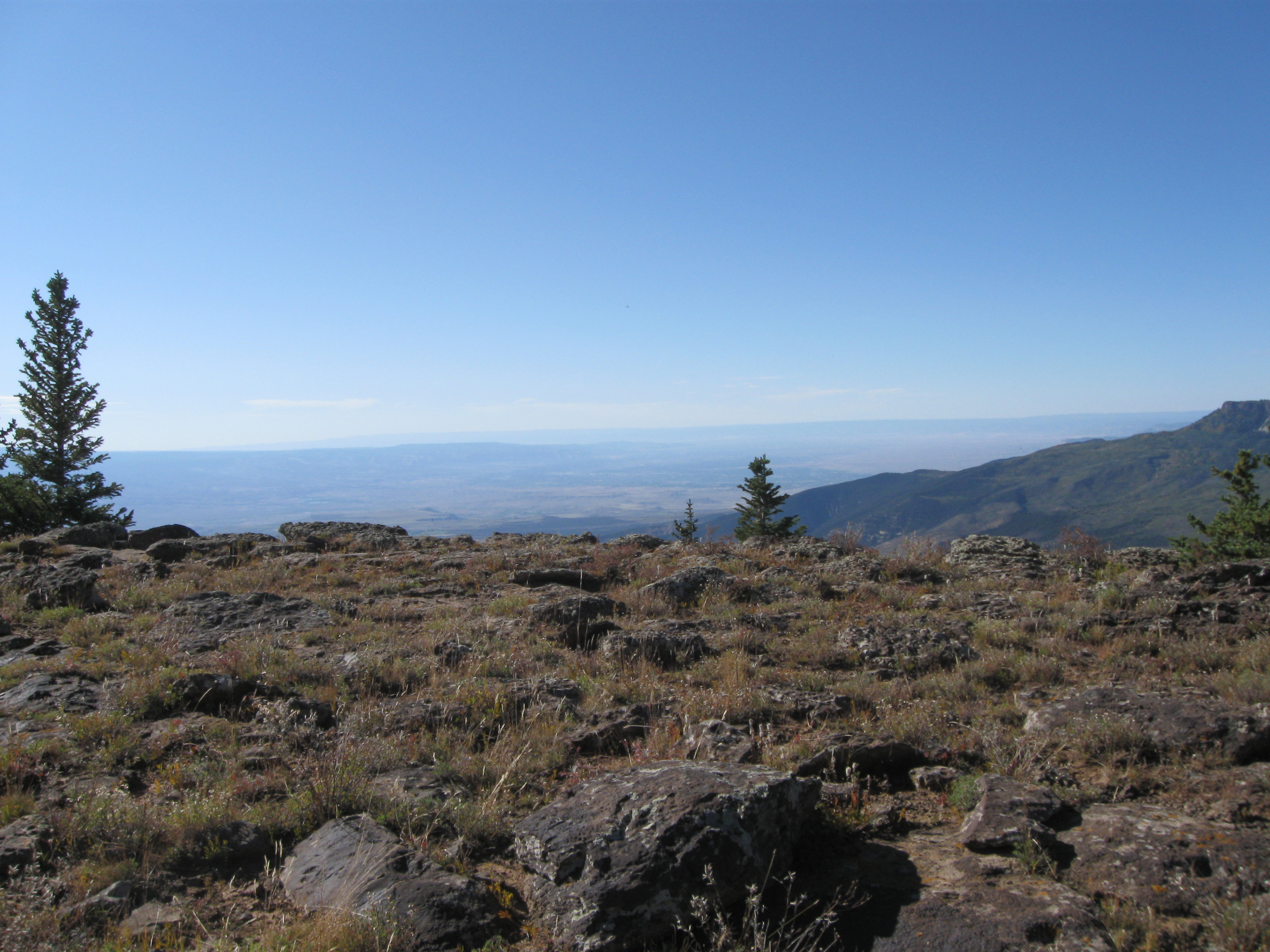
The view towards Grand Junction.

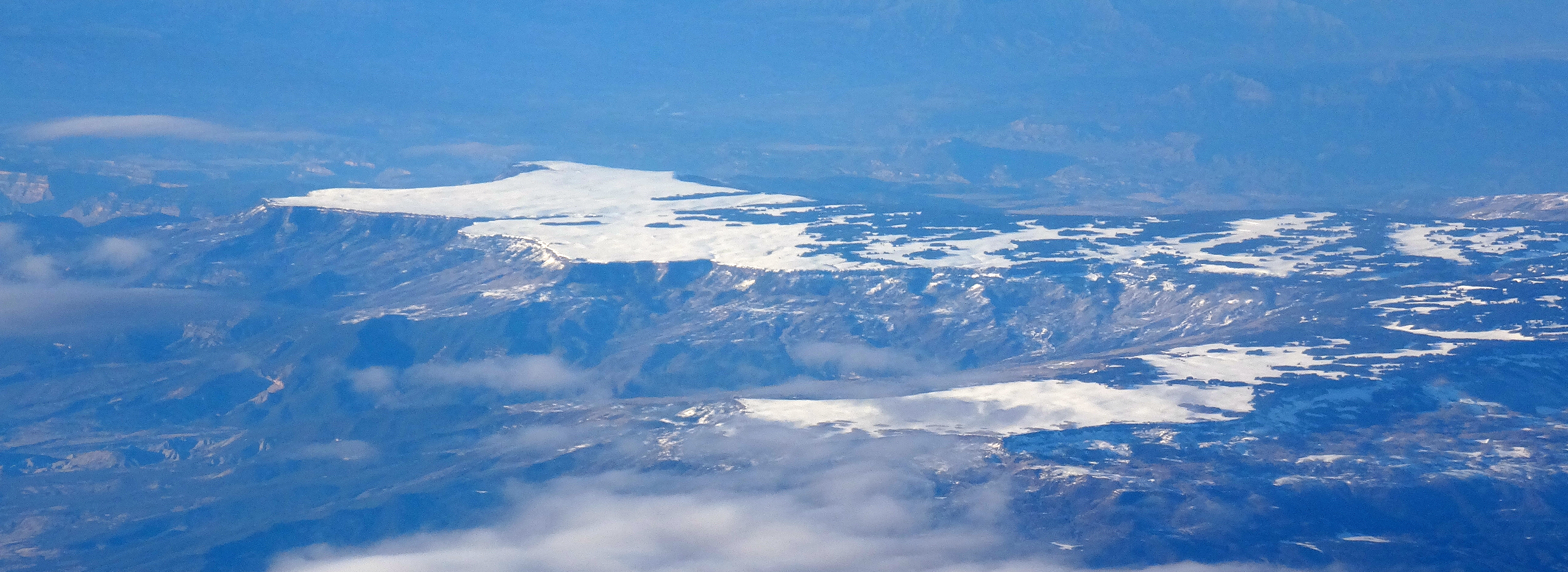
An aerial photograph of Grand Mesa.

== See also ==
- Mountain ranges of Colorado
- Table (landform)
- 2014 West Salt Creek landslide
