= National Register of Historic Places listings in Delta County, Colorado =

Location of Delta County in Colorado

This is a list of the National Register of Historic Places listings in Delta County, Colorado.

This is intended to be a complete list of the properties and districts on the National Register of Historic Places in Delta County, Colorado, United States. The locations of National Register properties and districts for which the latitude and longitude coordinates are included below, may be seen in a map.

There are 17 properties and districts listed on the National Register in the county. Another 4 properties were once listed but have been removed.

This National Park Service list is complete through NPS recent listings posted August 28, 2026.

== Current listings ==
	Name on the Register	Image	Date listed	Location	City or town	Description
1	Bross Hotel	Bross Hotel	November 16, 2015 (#15000780)	312 Onarga Ave. 38°52′08″N 107°35′48″W	Paonia	
2	Curtis Hardware Store	Curtis Hardware Store	October 19, 1989 (#89001746)	228 Grand Ave. 38°52′05″N 107°35′52″W	Paonia	
3	Delta County Bank Building	Delta County Bank Building	June 24, 1993 (#93000577)	301 and 305 Main St. 38°44′34″N 108°04′14″W	Delta	
4	Delta Municipal Light & Power Plant	Delta Municipal Light & Power Plant	March 18, 2024 (#100010079)	1133 Main St. 38°43′55″N 108°04′15″W	Delta	
4	Egyptian Theater	Egyptian Theater	July 12, 1993 (#93000575)	452 Main St. 38°44′27″N 108°04′11″W	Delta	
5	Ferganchick Orchard Rock Art Site		May 9, 1983 (#83001304)	Address Restricted	Austin	
6	First Methodist Episcopal Church of Delta	First Methodist Episcopal Church of Delta	February 20, 1991 (#91000069)	199 E. 5th St. 38°44′25″N 108°04′09″W	Delta	
7	First Presbyterian Church of Eckert	First Presbyterian Church of Eckert	January 11, 2006 (#05001507)	13011 and 13025 State Highway 65; 38°49′42″N 107°58′14″W	Eckert	
8	Garnethurst	Garnethurst	November 7, 1995 (#95001245)	509 Leon St. 38°44′25″N 108°03′45″W	Delta	
9	Hotchkiss Homestead	Hotchkiss Homestead	December 15, 2011 (#11000900)	422 Riverside Dr. 38°47′59″N 107°43′55″W	Hotchkiss	
10	Hotchkiss Hotel	Hotchkiss Hotel	September 20, 1984 (#84000802)	101 Bridge St. 38°47′57″N 107°43′09″W	Hotchkiss	
11	Hotchkiss Methodist Episcopal Church	Hotchkiss Methodist Episcopal Church	October 28, 2009 (#09000853)	285 N. 2nd St. 38°47′59″N 107°43′10″W	Hotchkiss	
12	Mathews House	Mathews House	October 6, 2004 (#04001110)	40647 Matthews Ln. 38°51′54″N 107°36′05″W	Paonia	
13	Paonia First Christian Church	Paonia First Christian Church	April 27, 2011 (#11000218)	235 Box Elder Ave. 38°52′05″N 107°35′39″W	Paonia	
14	Stolte House	Stolte House	November 17, 1997 (#97001280)	1812 State Highway 65; 38°55′03″N 107°55′21″W	Cedaredge	
15	Surface Creek Livestock Company Silos	Surface Creek Livestock Company Silos	April 27, 2000 (#00000367)	315 SW. 3rd St. 38°53′57″N 107°55′30″W	Cedaredge	
16	US Post Office and Federal Building-Delta Main	US Post Office and Federal Building-Delta Main	January 24, 1986 (#86000173)	360 Meeker St. 38°44′31″N 108°04′06″W	Delta	

== Former listings ==
	Name on the Register	Image	Date listed	Date removed	Location	City or town	Description
1	Delta Bridge	Delta Bridge	February 4, 1985 (#85000198)	July 22, 1994	US Highway 50 westbound at Gunnison River	Delta	Replaced 1993.
2	Escalante Canyon Bridge	Escalante Canyon Bridge	February 4, 1985 (#85000196)	July 22, 1994	County Road 650R at Gunnison River	Delta	Demolished Spring 1993
3	Hotchkiss Bridge	Hotchkiss Bridge	February 4, 1985 (#85000199)	July 22, 1994	County Road 3400R at North Fork Gunnison River	Hotchkiss	Demolished Summer 1988
4	Roubideau Bridge	Roubideau Bridge	February 4, 1985 (#85000197)	July 22, 1994	County Road G50R at Gunnison River	Delta	Demolished Summer 1992

== See also ==
- List of National Historic Landmarks in Colorado
- List of National Register of Historic Places in Colorado
- Bibliography of Colorado
- Geography of Colorado
- History of Colorado
- Index of Colorado-related articles
- List of Colorado-related lists
- Outline of Colorado
