= North Fork Gunnison River =

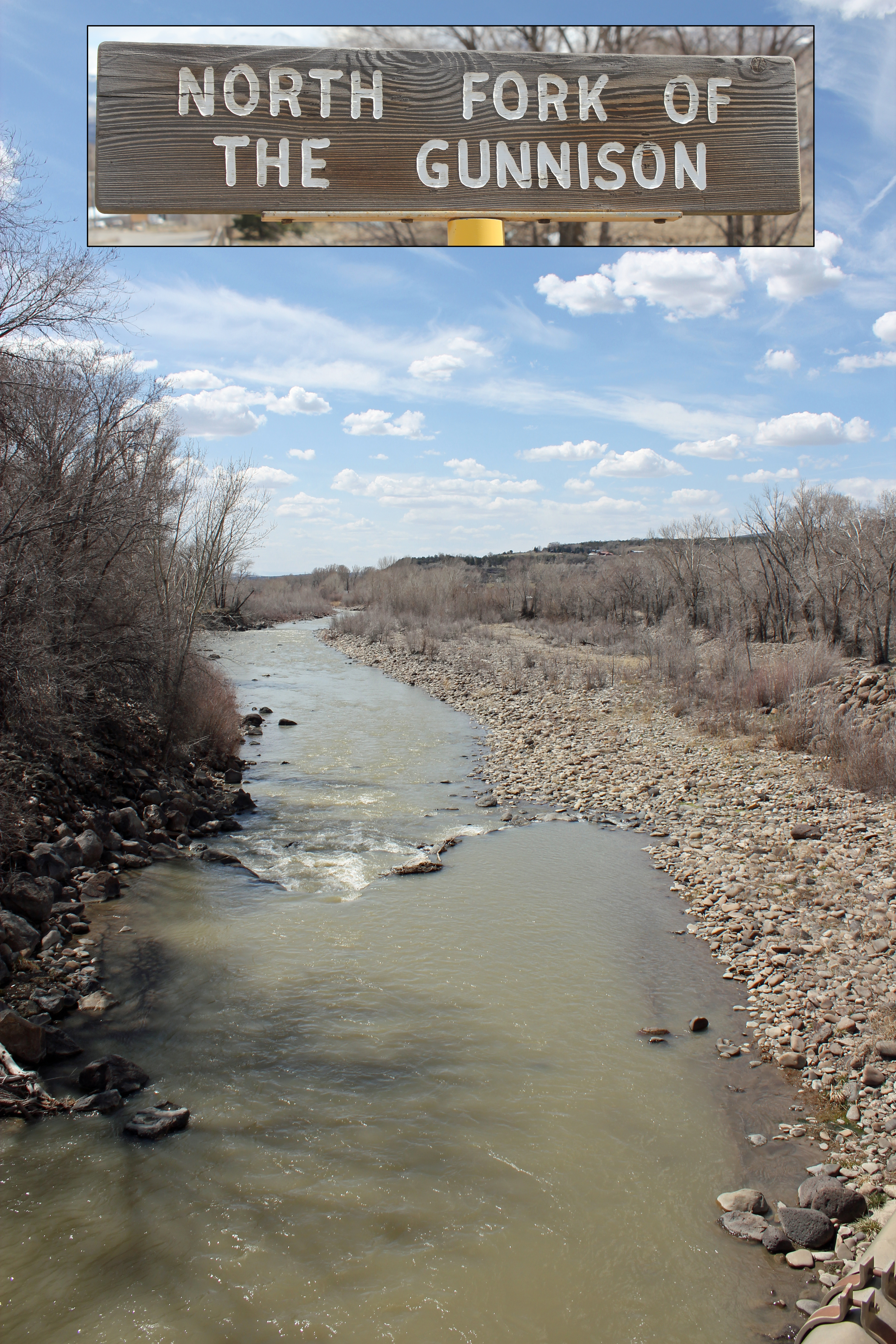
- The river near Paonia, Colorado.

Location
- Country: United States
- State: Colorado

Physical characteristics
- Source: Rocky Mountains
  - coordinates: 38°56′35″N 107°21′8″W
  - elevation: 6,470 ft (1,970 m)
- Mouth: Gunnison River
  - coordinates: 38°46′58″N 107°50′12″W
  - elevation: 5,096 ft (1,553 m)
- Basin size: 741 mi^{2} (1,920 km^{2})
- Discharge
  - location: Below Paonia
  - average: 227 cu ft/s (6.4 m^{3}/s)
  - minimum: 4.4 cu ft/s (0.12 m^{3}/s)
  - maximum: 3,990 cu ft/s (113 m^{3}/s)

The North Fork Gunnison River (locally known as the North Fork) is a tributary of the Gunnison River, 33.5 miles (53.9 km) long, in southwestern Colorado in the United States. It drains part of the southwestern flank of the Elk Mountains northeast of Delta.

It is formed in the mountains of northwestern Gunnison County by the confluence of Muddy Creek and Anthracite Creek. The confluence is located along State Highway 133 on the south side of McClure Pass. It descends to the southwest through a widening valley past Somerset, Paonia, and Hotchkiss. It joins the Gunnison in eastern Delta County downstream from the Black Canyon between Delta and Hotchkiss. The valley of the river, called the North Fork Valley, has a temperate climate that has historically been a center of fruit growing in southwestern Colorado. It is also a regional center of the coal mining industry, centered on the mining town of Somerset in the upper valley. Modern coal mining operations are highly visible along the upper valley walls. The creeks at the headwaters of the river pass through areas of highly erodible shale, resulting in high concentrations of sediment during springtime runoff.

== See also ==
- List of rivers in Colorado
- List of tributaries of the Colorado River
