= Orchard City, Colorado =

Town in Colorado, United States

- Town
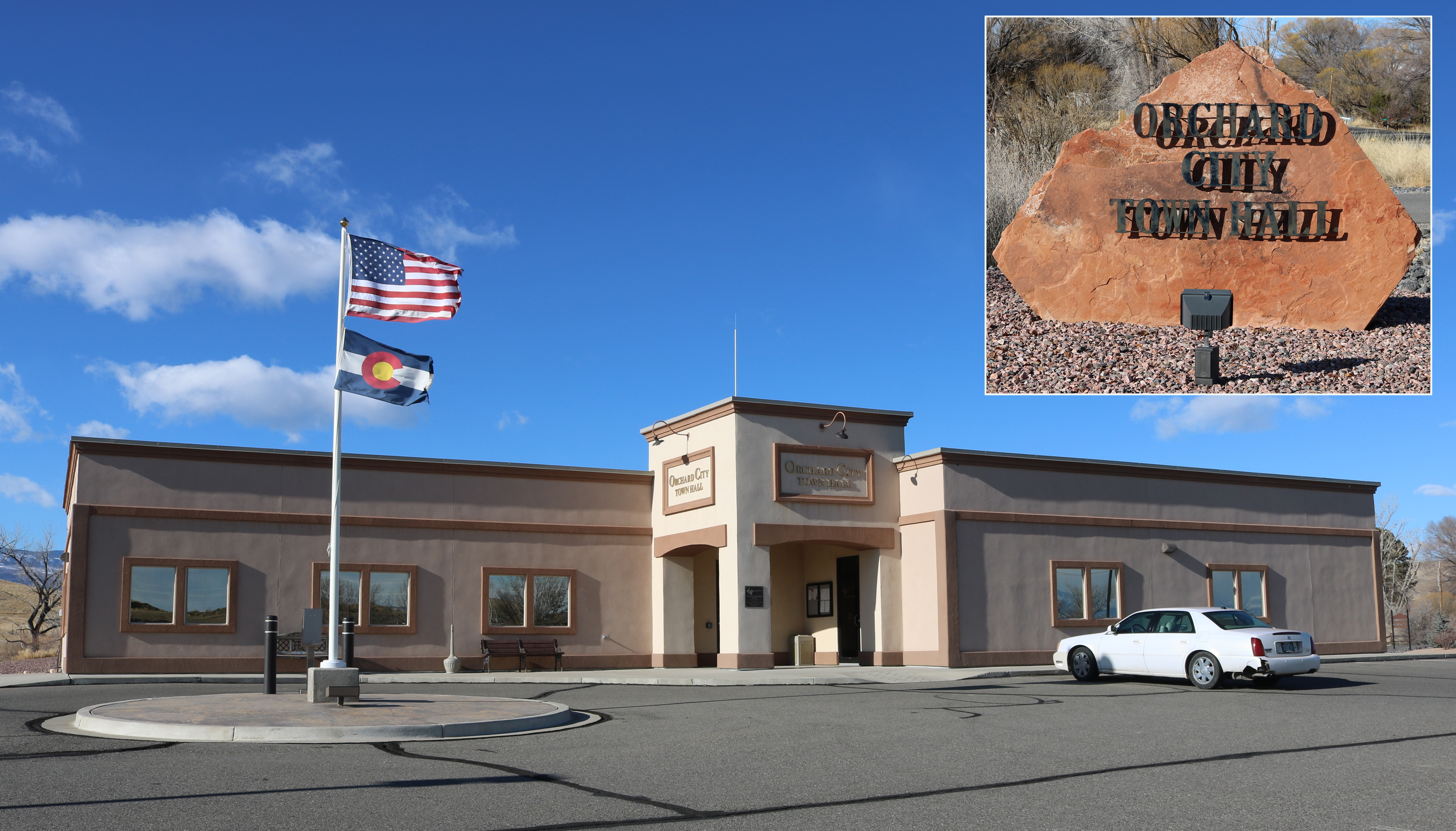
- Town hall on 2100 Road

- Location of Orchard City in Delta County, Colorado.
- Coordinates: 38°47′59″N 107°58′56″W
- Country: United States
- State: Colorado
- County: Delta
- Incorporated (town): May 25, 1912

Government
  - Type: Statutory town

Area
  - Total: 11.53 sq mi (29.86 km^{2})
  - Land: 11.52 sq mi (29.84 km^{2})
  - Water: 0.0077 sq mi (0.02 km^{2})
- Elevation: 5,361 ft (1,634 m)

Population (2020)
  - Total: 3,142
  - Density: 272.7/sq mi (105.3/km^{2})
- Time zone: UTC-7 (Mountain (MST))
  - Summer (DST): UTC-6 (MDT)
- ZIP code: 81410
- Area code: 970
- FIPS code: 08-55980
- GNIS feature ID: 2413088
- Website: www.orchardcityco.org

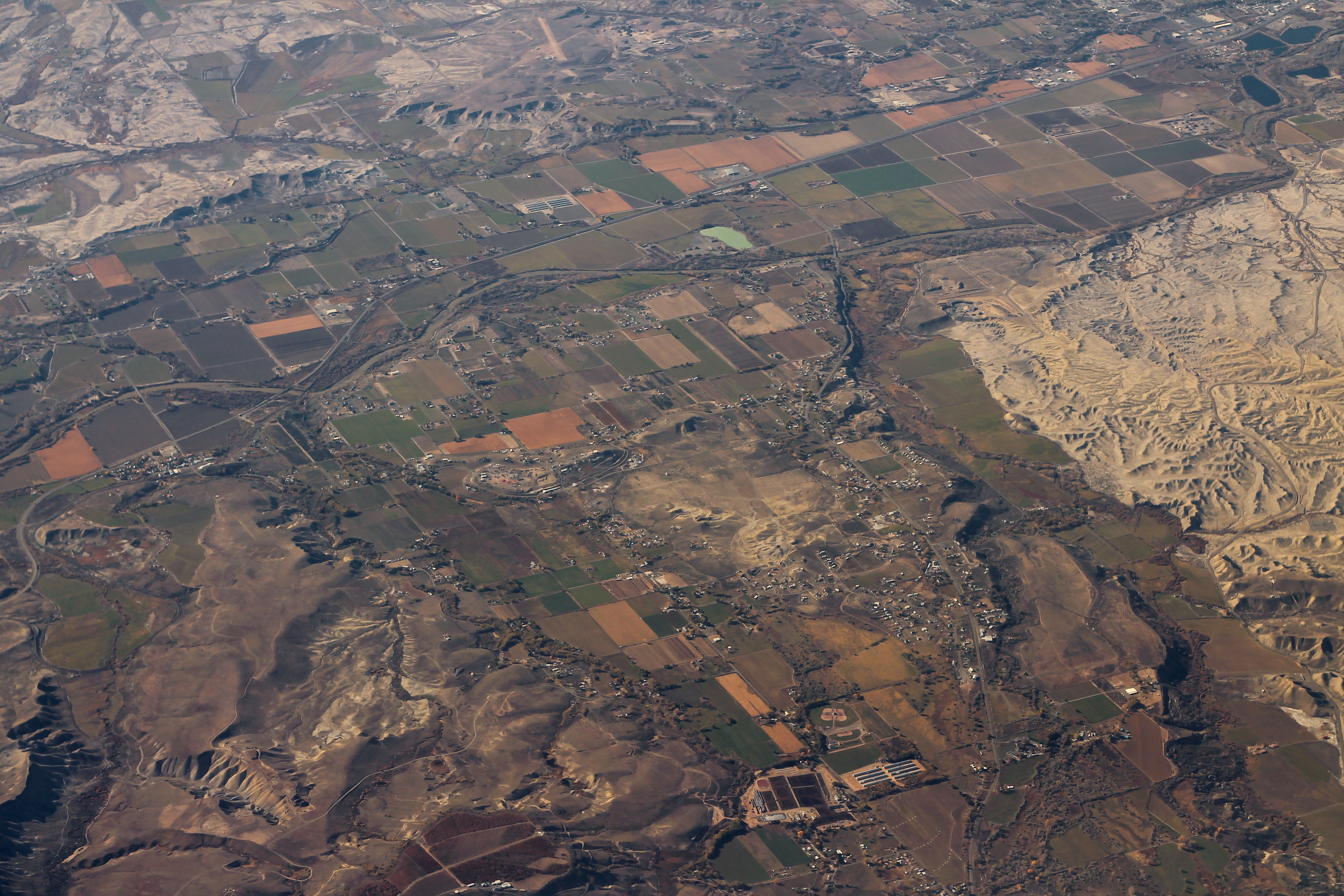
An aerial photo of Orchard City.

Orchard City is a statutory town in Delta County, Colorado, United States. The population was 3,142 at the 2020 census. There are three post offices serving Orchard City: Austin (ZIP code 81410), Cory (ZIP code 81414), Eckert (ZIP code 81418).

== Geography ==
Orchard City is located in central Delta County at 38°48′59″N 107°58′37″W (38.816360, -107.976951). Colorado State Highway 65 passes through the town, leading southwest 9 miles (14 km) to Delta, the county seat, and northeast 6 miles (10 km) to the town of Cedaredge. Eckert is in the northern part of the town, and Cory is in the southwest, both along Highway 65. Austin is in the southeast corner of the town, on the north side of Colorado State Highway 92, which leads west 7 miles (11 km) to Delta and east 13 miles (21 km) to Hotchkiss.

According to the United States Census Bureau, Orchard City has a total area of 11.4 square miles (29.6 km^{2}), of which 0.01 square miles (0.02 km^{2}), or 0.06%, is water.

== History ==
In the early 20th century, because residents in the area were getting sick from drinking ditch water, three small communities (Austin, Cory, and Eckert) agreed to consolidate in order to be able to raise enough money to build a water pipeline. Thus Orchard City was incorporated in 1912, but even to this day it's more common for people to refer to one of the three specific communities within the boundaries of Orchard City. The community was named for an orchard near the original town site.

== Government and politics ==
Mayors of the Town of Orchard City
The Honorable	Term start	Term end	Term(s)
Jim Erickson			
Tom Huerkamp	April 2004	April 2008	1
Don Suppes	April 2008	April 2016	2
Ken Volgamore	April 2016	incumbent	current

The Town of Orchard City is governed by a council of six elected at-large trustees and an independently elected mayor. Together, the mayor and trustees, form the government of the Town of Orchard City. The Board of Trustees typically meets twice a month for a work session and meeting.

In 1912, the first election saw George Williamson elected mayor, and the trustees were J.P. Kettle, George Weyrauch, E.E. White, William Start, E.J. Coffey, and Charles Dixon. The first Town Clerk was Ernest Sudgen.

In 1993, the Town of Orchard City and the Field of Dreams build a baseball park with the help of Colorado Great Outdoors Funds. By 2000, controversy over finances and maintenance resulted in the town developing an enterprise fund to directly manage the park.

In 2004, the ACE Citizens Committee, which included E.J. Verdahl, Jack Chaffee, and Robert Denton, was successful in a petition drive that led to the recall of Orchard City Trustee Katie Benson Schuster Sickles.

Prior to the recall election of April 2004, the Colorado District Court heard oral arguments in the case of Burgess v. Town of Orchard City, which examined whether David Burgess, candidate running against Trustee Schuster, satisfied the residential requirements in order to run. Trustee Schuster alleged that Burgess should not be certified to run, because he did not live in the town. Town Clerk Gio Garver refused to certify Burgess' petition because the town was not 100% certain where he lived. Burgess was remodelling his home and lived in a temporary trailer outside the town limits. The court held that Colorado Revised Statute 31-10-301 and the case of Theobald v. Byrns in which the Colorado Supreme Court interpreted domicile as being left up to the individual to choose which address they would make as their domicile, thus Mr. Burgess’ voter registration could be used to help determine domicile. David Burgess was defeated in his re-election bid in April 2006.

On December 12, 2006, Mayor Tom Huerkamp survived a special recall election in which Guy Cooper challenged the incumbent. Under the Huerkamp Administration, the town built a $1.3 million town hall, ended a Prohibition Era ban on the sale of alcohol in town, and renamed most of the town's roads, along with removing highway signs referencing the unincorporated communities of Cory, Eckert and Austin. During the mid-2000s, Orchard City's board of trustees meetings were emotional events that packed dozens of citizens into the gallery and typically ended with sheriff's deputies separating Huerkamp loyalists from detractors. In April 2008, Mayor Huerkamp lost his re-election bid to then-trustee, Don Suppes.

In 2012, Trustee Matt Soper, at age 27, was elected the youngest trustee in the town's 100-year history.

On April 6, 2016, Trustee Ken Volgamore, who was appointed to fill the seat vacated by Trustee Soper, was elected mayor of Orchard City, defeating long time trustee, Jan Gage, 58% to 42%. The current Board of Trustees consists of Craig Fuller, Dick Kirkpatrick, Gynee Thomassen, Thomas H. Huerkamp (former mayor), Bob Eckels, and a vacancy created with the election of Trustee Volgamore to serve as mayor.

== Demographics ==
Historical population
Census	Pop.	Note	%±
1920	531		—
1940	865		—
1950	956		10.5%
1960	1,021		6.8%
1970	1,163		13.9%
1980	1,914		64.6%
1990	2,218		15.9%
2000	2,880		29.8%
2010	3,119		8.3%
2020	3,142		0.7%

=== 2020 census ===
As of the 2020 census, Orchard City had a population of 3,142. The median age was 54.0 years. 18.9% of residents were under the age of 18 and 32.5% of residents were 65 years of age or older. For every 100 females there were 94.3 males, and for every 100 females age 18 and over there were 93.8 males age 18 and over.

0.0% of residents lived in urban areas, while 100.0% lived in rural areas.

There were 1,341 households in Orchard City, of which 21.5% had children under the age of 18 living in them. Of all households, 52.7% were married-couple households, 19.4% were households with a male householder and no spouse or partner present, and 23.2% were households with a female householder and no spouse or partner present. About 29.9% of all households were made up of individuals and 17.8% had someone living alone who was 65 years of age or older.

There were 1,465 housing units, of which 8.5% were vacant. The homeowner vacancy rate was 1.6% and the rental vacancy rate was 4.9%.

Racial composition as of the 2020 census
Race	Number	Percent
White	2,803	89.2%
Black or African American	8	0.3%
American Indian and Alaska Native	14	0.4%
Asian	15	0.5%
Native Hawaiian and Other Pacific Islander	1	0.0%
Some other race	117	3.7%
Two or more races	184	5.9%
Hispanic or Latino (of any race)	310	9.9%

== See also ==
- Colorado municipalities
