= Colorado State Highway 187 =

State highway in Colorado, United States

State Highway 187
- Grand Avenue

Route information
- Maintained by CDOT
- Length: 0.689 mi (1,109 m)
- Existed: ?–2010

Major junctions
- South end: 4th Street in Paonia
- North end: SH 133 near Paonia

Location
- Country: United States
- State: Colorado
- Counties: Delta

Highway system
- Colorado State Highway System; Interstate; US; State; Scenic
← SH 184	→ SH 194

State Highway 187 (SH 187) was a highway near Paonia, Colorado.

== Route description ==
SH 187 ran about 0.7 miles (1.1 km), starting at the intersection of Grand Avenue and 4th Street in Paonia and went directly north. It crossed over the North Fork of the Gunnison River and ended at a junction with SH 133 north of town.

== History ==
The highway was transferred from Colorado Department of Transportation jurisdiction to Delta County in the end of 2010.

== Major intersections ==
The entire route was in Delta County.

Location	mi	km	Destinations	Notes
Paonia	0.000	0.000	4th Street / Grand Avenue	
	0.689	1.109	SH 133 / Stevens Gulch Road – Hotchkiss, Carbondale	
1.000 mi = 1.609 km; 1.000 km = 0.621 mi
