= Delta County Memorial Hospital =

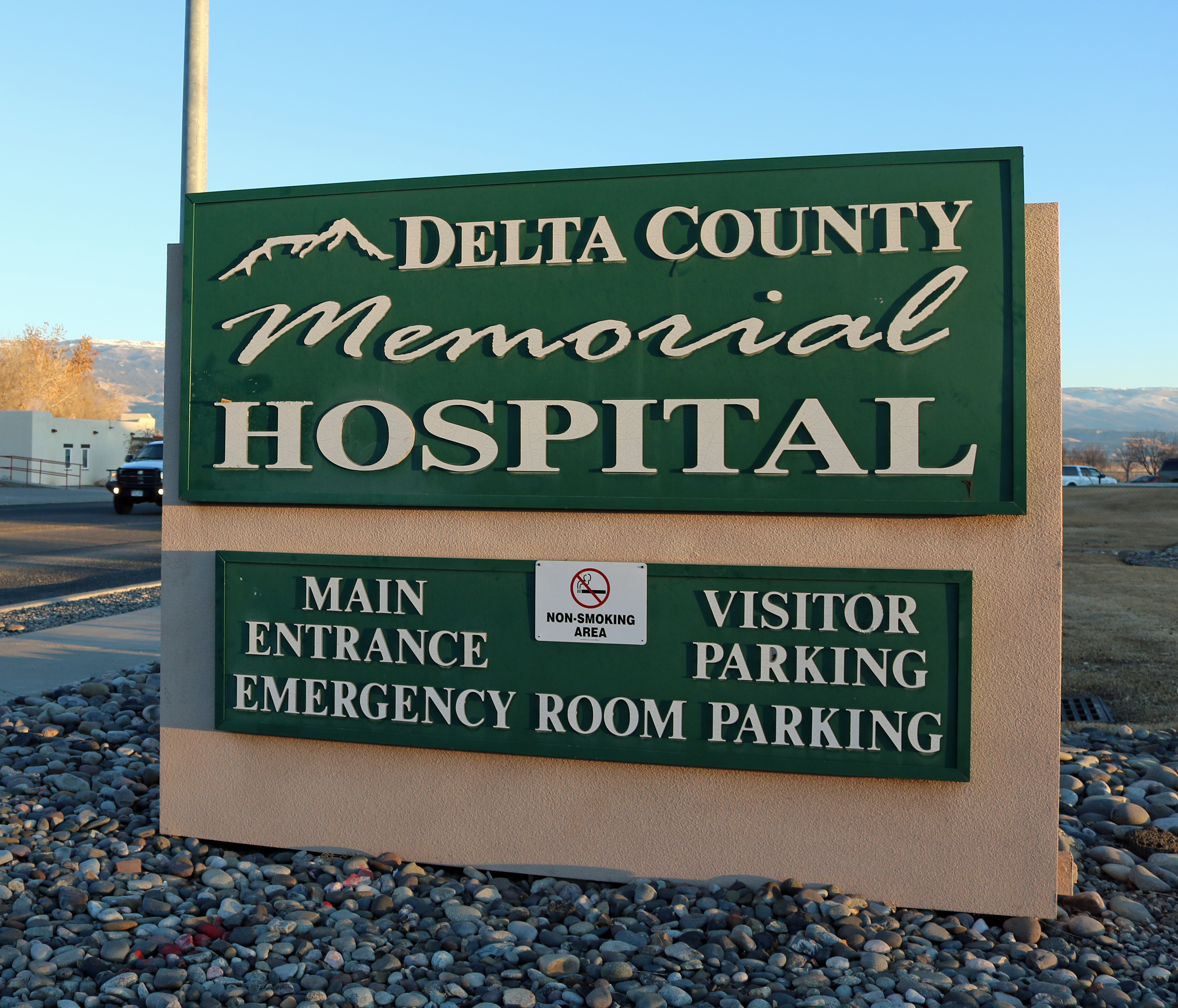
- The sign at the hospital's main entrance

- The hospital's location in Colorado.

Geography
- Location: 1501 E. 3rd Street; Delta, Colorado 80807, Delta County, Colorado, United States
- Coordinates: 38°44′42″N 108°02′49″W

Organization
- Type: District general

Services
- Emergency department: Level IV trauma center
- Beds: 49

History
- Founded: 1975

Links
- Website: www.deltahospital.org
- Lists: Hospitals in Colorado

Delta County Memorial Hospital is a regional hospital in Delta, Colorado, in Delta County. The hospital has 49 beds.

The hospital is part of the Delta County Memorial Hospital District, a special district. The current hospital organization was established in 1975, succeeding several previous hospitals and hospital organizations that existed in Delta as far back as 1913. The current main hospital building opened in 2008.

The hospital is a Level IV trauma center. It operates walk-in clinics in Paonia and Hotchkiss, in addition to the seven specialty clinics based in Delta.

== Cyberattack ==
On May 27–30, 2024, this hospital experienced a cyberattack, with suspicious actions on its network. An investigation confirmed that an unauthorized third party accessed the network, potentially stealing the information of 148,363 individuals.
