= Delta County Libraries =

The Delta County Library system consists of five libraries serving its rural towns in Colorado: Delta, Hotchkiss, Cedaredge, Paonia, and Crawford. The Delta County Library district serves the county's 30,334 total population. All library branches hold scheduled programs for all age groups, and the Delta Libraries offer family classes. GED and ESL courses are offered through the library.

The Library District is overseen by the Library Board with representatives from each of the library branch communities as well as other representatives that are "at large".

- District Director: LaDonna Gunn
- Collections Coordinator: Kristi Lloyd
- PR & Marketing Manager: Kathryn Delaney
- Program and Outreach Manager, Literacy, GED, ESL: Teresa Weinberg
- North Fork Regional Library Manager: Arthur Harriman
- West End Regional Library Manager: Claudia Bishop

== History ==
The Delta library (1911) building is associated with the nationwide Carnegie public library movement. Through the Carnegie Foundation contributing $6500 towards construction, and efforts of the local Woman's club who raised $3400, the Delta Library was dedicated in 1912. Architect G.R. Felmlee designed the original building out of yellow brick with sandstone trim. An addition by Dona, Larson, Roubal & Assoc. was designed for the building in 1984.

The current Cedaredge Library building opened in 1997, the Hotchkiss Library in 2002, the Delta Library received a large addition in 2005, the Crawford Library was constructed in 2008, and the Paonia Library in 2009.

== Locations ==
Cedaredge Branch - 180 SW 6th Ave. Cedaredge, CO 81413

Crawford Branch - 545 Hwy. 92 Crawford, CO 81415

Hotchkiss Branch - 149 E. Main Hotchkiss, CO 81419

Delta Branch - 211 W. 6th Street Delta, CO 81416

Paonia Branch - 2 3rd Street Paonia, CO 81428
