= Lazear =

Lazear is a surname. Notable people with the surname include:

- Edward Lazear (1948–2020), American economist
- Jesse Lazear (1804–1877), American politician
- Jesse William Lazear (1866–1900), American physician

== See also ==
- Lazar (name)
- Lazear, Colorado
