= Landsend Peak =

Mountain in Colorado, US

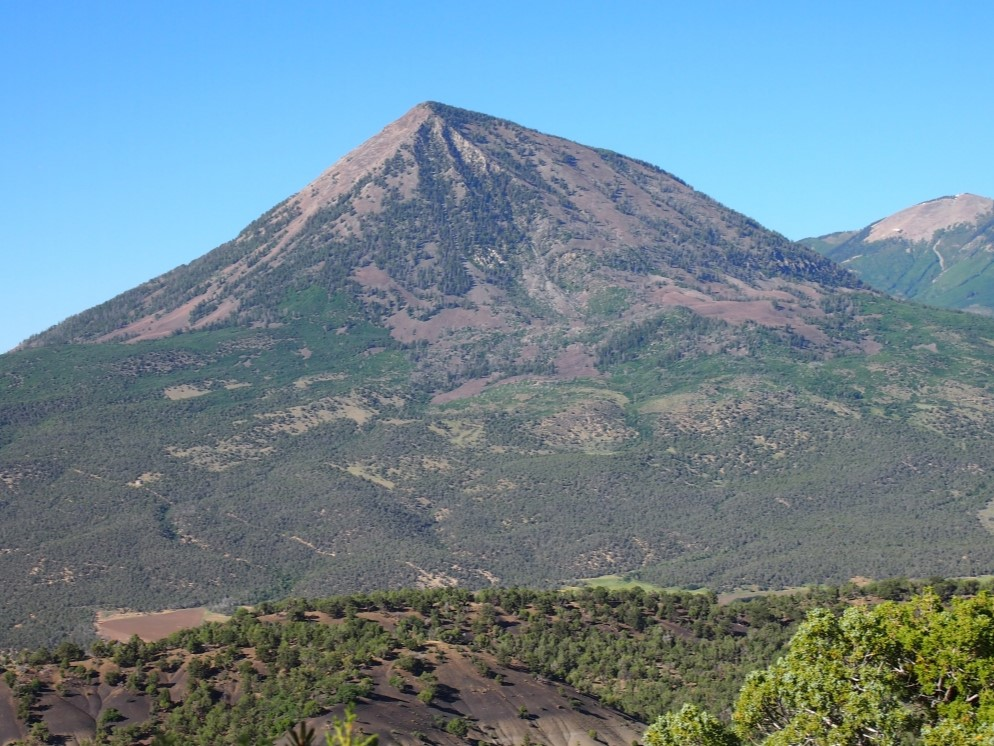
- Landsend Peak near Crawford, Colorado (West Elk Mountains)

Highest point
- Elevation: 10,806 ft (3,294 m)
- Prominence: 1,286 ft (392 m)
- Isolation: 2.38 mi (3.83 km)
- Coordinates: 38°46′15″N 107°33′06″W

Geography
- Location within Colorado
- Location: Delta County, Colorado, United States
- Parent range: West Elk Mountains
- Topo map(s): USGS 7.5' topographic map Paonia, Colorado

Landsend Peak is a prominent wedge-shaped mountain located in the West Elk Mountains range northeast of Crawford, Colorado. The summit of Landsend Peak has an elevation of 10,806 ft (3,294 m) rising dramatically about 4,000 ft (1,200 m) above the valley below. Together with nearby Mount Lamborn to the northeast (the highest point in Delta County), it delineates the western edge of the West Elk Mountains (and West Elk Wilderness), and the two massifs top out about 1 mile (1.6 km) higher than the adjacent North Fork Gunnison River. Both peaks lie within the Gunnison National Forest near the physiographic boundary of the Rocky Mountains and the Colorado Plateau provinces. Geologically, Landsend Peak and Mount Lamborn are exposed igneous intrusions that geologists call laccoliths.
