= Hotchkiss Methodist Episcopal Church =

Historic church in Colorado, United States

- U.S. National Register of Historic Places
- Colorado State Register of Historic Properties
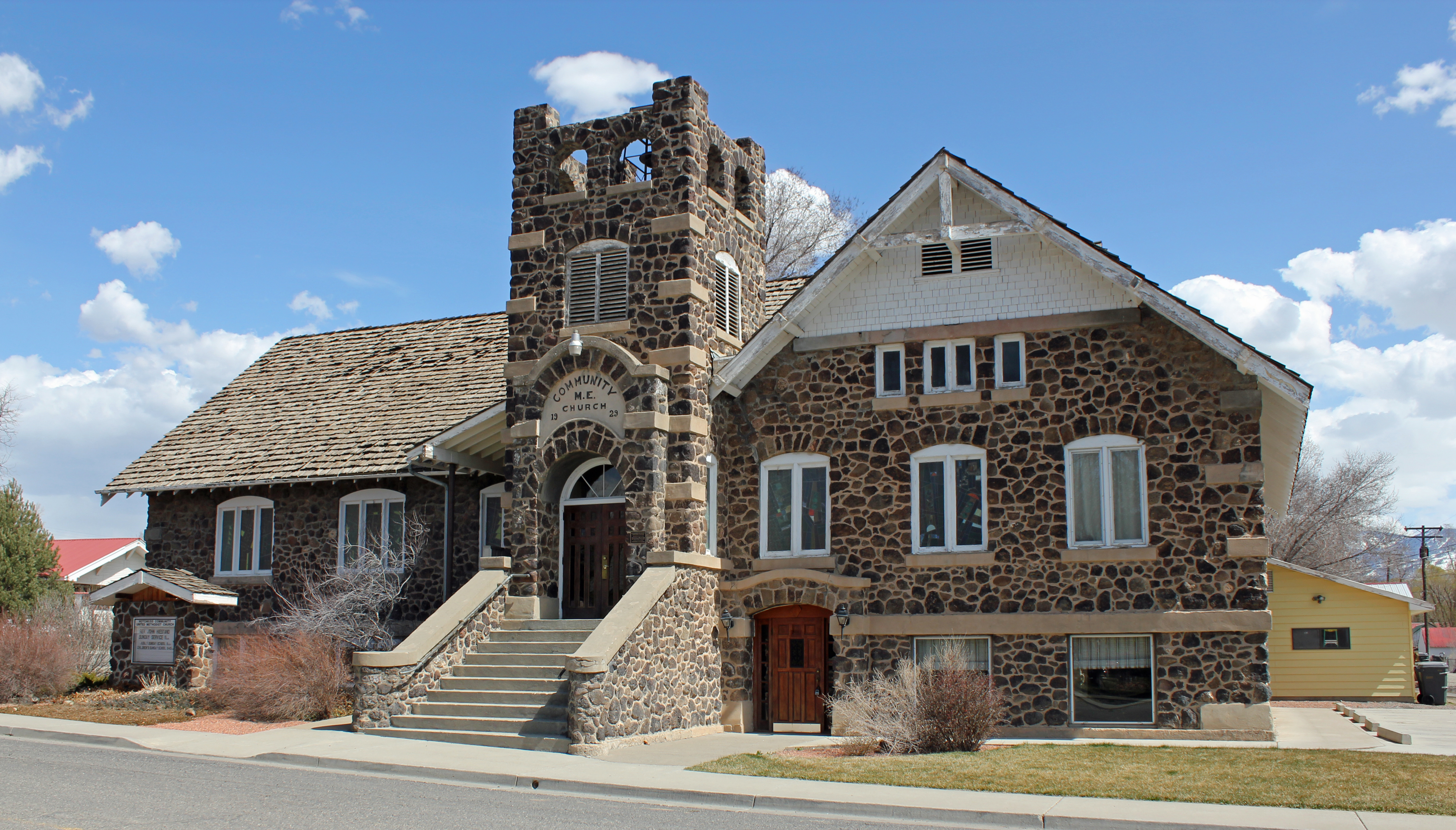
- The church in 2013.

- Location within Colorado Location within the United States
- Location: 285 N. 2nd St., Hotchkiss, Colorado
- Coordinates: 38°48′2″N 107°43′6″W
- Area: less than one acre
- Built: 1929
- Architect: Stewart, Peter
- Architectural style: Bungalow/craftsman
- NRHP reference No.: 09000853
- CSRHP No.: 5DT.1769
- Added to NRHP: October 28, 2009

Hotchkiss Methodist Episcopal Church (Hotchkiss United Methodist Church; Hotchkiss Community United Methodist Church) is a historic church at 285 N. 2nd Street in Hotchkiss, Colorado. It was built in 1929 and was added to the National Register of Historic Places in 2009.

It is Craftsman in style, and includes local basalt rock.

The church was founded in 1893 and its first building was built in 1898.
