= Bross Hotel =

- U.S. National Register of Historic Places
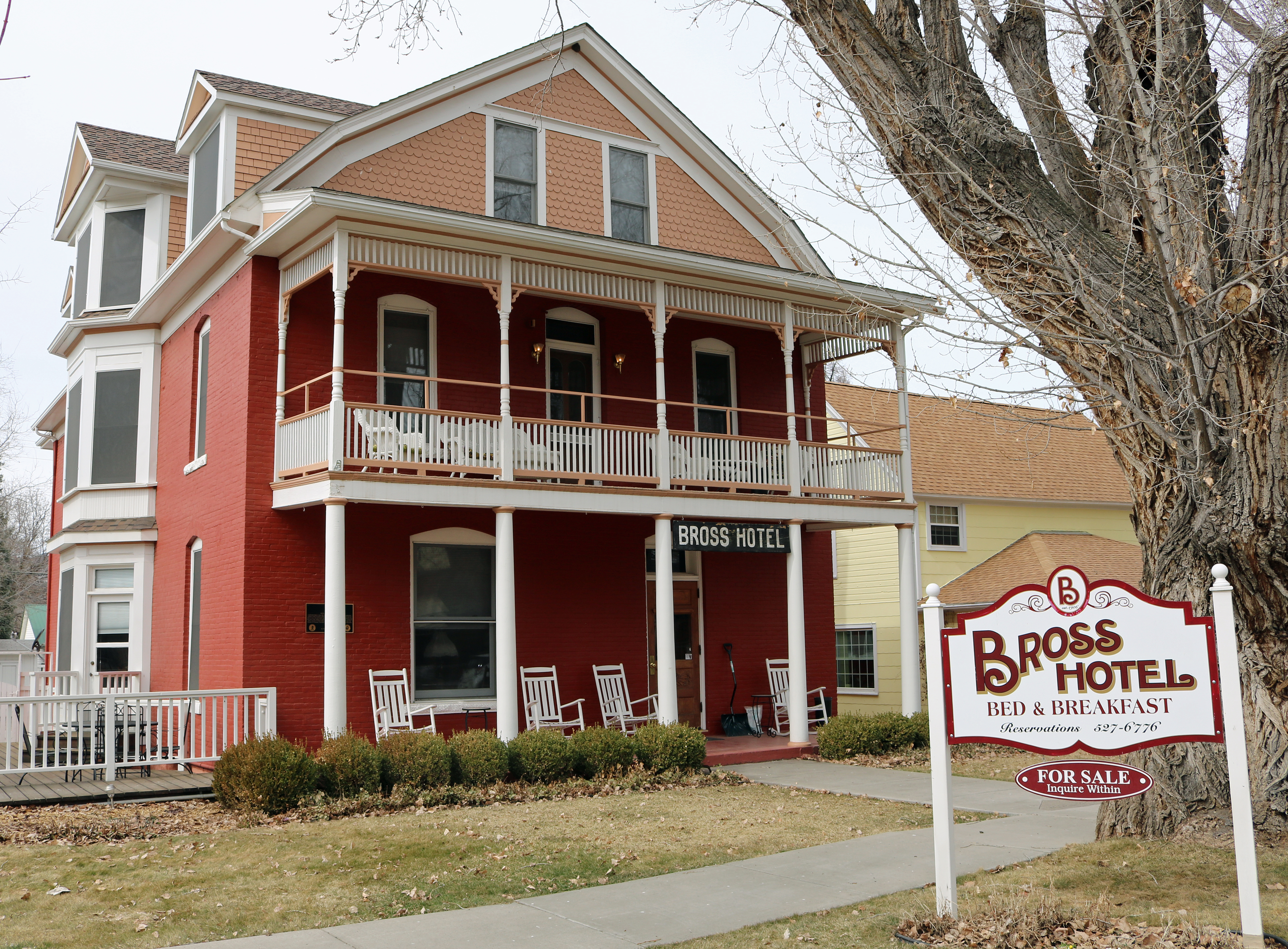

- Location within Colorado
- Location: 312 Onarga Ave., Paonia, Colorado
- Coordinates: 38°52′08″N 107°35′48″W
- Area: .42 acres (0.17 ha)
- Architectural style: Romanesque
- NRHP reference No.: 15000780
- Added to NRHP: November 16, 2015

The Bross Hotel, at 312 Onarga Avenue in Paonia, Colorado, was listed on the National Register of Historic Places in 2015.

It is a two-and-one-half-story brick building with a two-story front porch, and is Late Victorian in style. It has a gambrel roof.
