= Colorado State Highway 133 =

State highway in Colorado, United States

State Highway 133
- SH 133 highlighted in red

Route information
- Maintained by CDOT
- Length: 71.4 mi (114.9 km)

Major junctions
- South end: SH 92 in Hotchkiss
- North end: SH 82 at Carbondale

Location
- Country: United States
- State: Colorado
- Counties: Delta, Gunnison, Pitkin, Garfield

Highway system
- Colorado State Highway System; Interstate; US; State; Scenic
← SH 131	→ SH 134

State Highway 133 (SH 133) is a 71.4 mi (114.9 km) long north–south byway connecting SH 92 to the south and SH 82 to the north, and travels through the towns of Hotchkiss, Somerset, Redstone, and Carbondale. Highway 133 travels over a significant mountain pass on the northern end, called McClure Pass, which is 8,755 ft (2,669 m) above sea level. The road travels right next to the Crystal River, known for whitewater river running.

== History ==
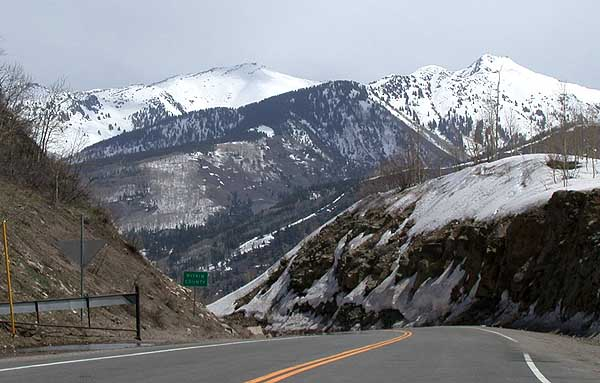
SH 133 looking north from the summit of McClure Pass near Marble

The route was established in the 1920s, when SH 133 began at SH 135 in Bardine and ended at Carbondale. SH 133 was then reroutes from SH 135 at Crested Butte to Carbondale by 1936. The route's south terminus was adjusted back to Bardine in 1939, and a small gap at McClure pass was opened. By 1954, a large section of the route was deleted, leaving only a four-mile (6 km) road near Carbondale. The route was gradually expanded through the late 1950s and early 1960s. The route was entirely paved by 1978.

== Major intersections ==
County	Location	mi	km	Destinations	Notes
Delta	Hotchkiss	0.00	0.00	SH 92 – Delta, Crawford	Southern terminus
Delta	Paonia	8.85	14.24	Grand Avenue	Northern terminus of former SH 187
Gunnison	No major junctions				
Pitkin	No major junctions				
Garfield	Carbondale	68.82	110.76	SH 82 – Glenwood, Aspen	Northern terminus
1.000 mi = 1.609 km; 1.000 km = 0.621 mi
