= Enos T. Hotchkiss =

American town founder

Enos Throop Hotchkiss (March 29, 1832 – January 20, 1900) was credited as being the founder of both Lake City, Colorado and Hotchkiss, Colorado. He is buried in Riverside Cemetery, Hotchkiss Colorado. He had nine children and two wives.
