= Bowie, Colorado =

Unincorporated community in Delta County, Colorado, United States

- Unincorporated community
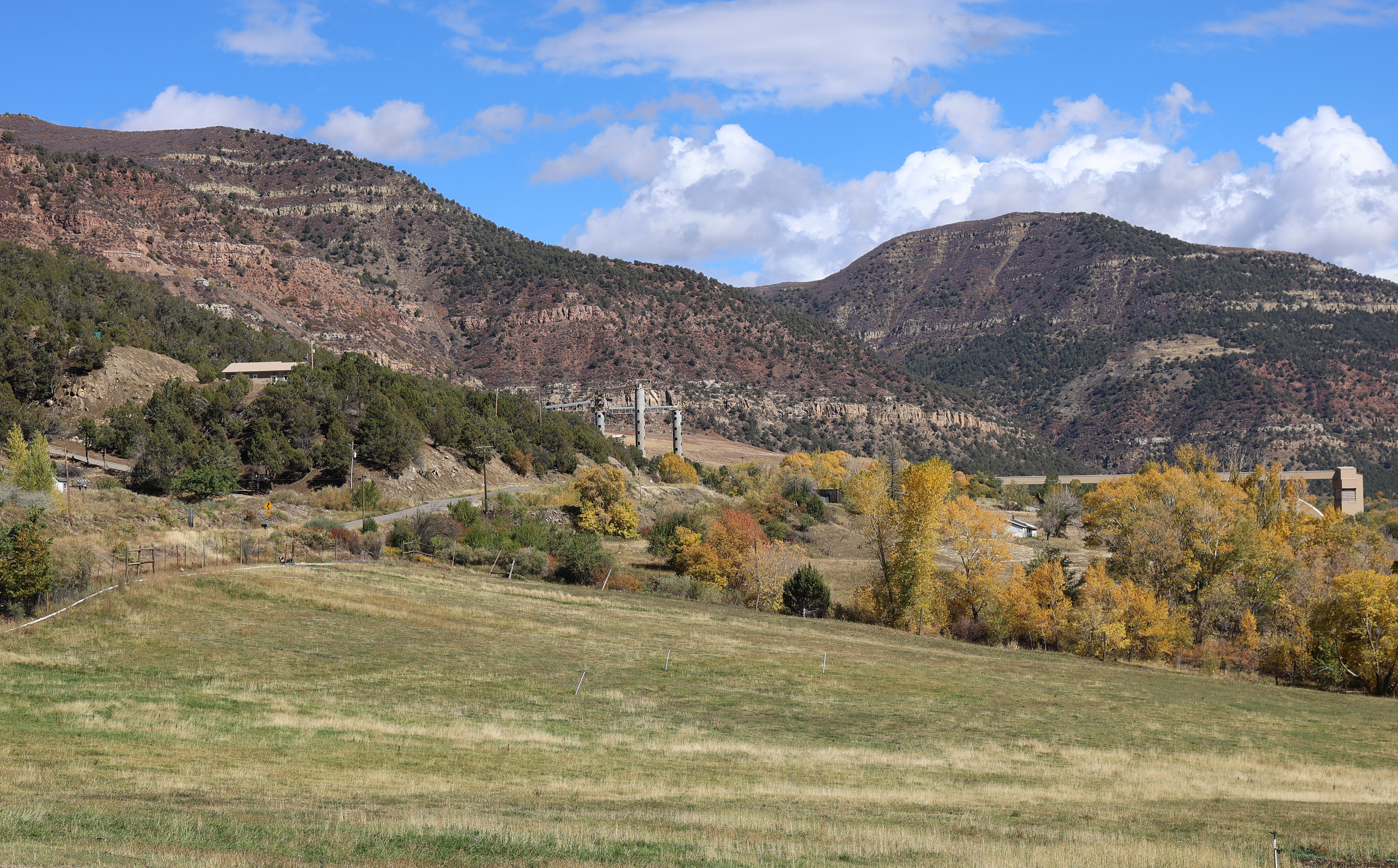
- Bowie in 2025, with some of the infrastructure from the Bowie No. 2 Mine (closed) visible, and Bowie Road (left)

- Location of Bowie, Colorado. Bowie (Colorado)
- Coordinates: 38°55′17″N 107°32′24″W
- Country: United States
- State: Colorado
- County: Delta

Government
  - Type: Unincorporated community
  - Body: Delta County
- Elevation: 5,965 ft (1,818 m)
- Time zone: UTC−07:00 (MST)
  - Summer (DST): UTC−06:00 (MDT)
- GNIS pop ID: 204744

Bowie is an unincorporated community in Delta County, in the U.S. state of Colorado.

== History ==
The Bowie, Colorado, post office operated from February 5, 1907, until July 14, 1967. The community was named after Alexander Bowie, the proprietor of a local mine.

== See also ==
- List of populated places in Colorado
