= Paonia First Christian Church =

Historic church in Paonia, Colorado, US

- U.S. National Register of Historic Places
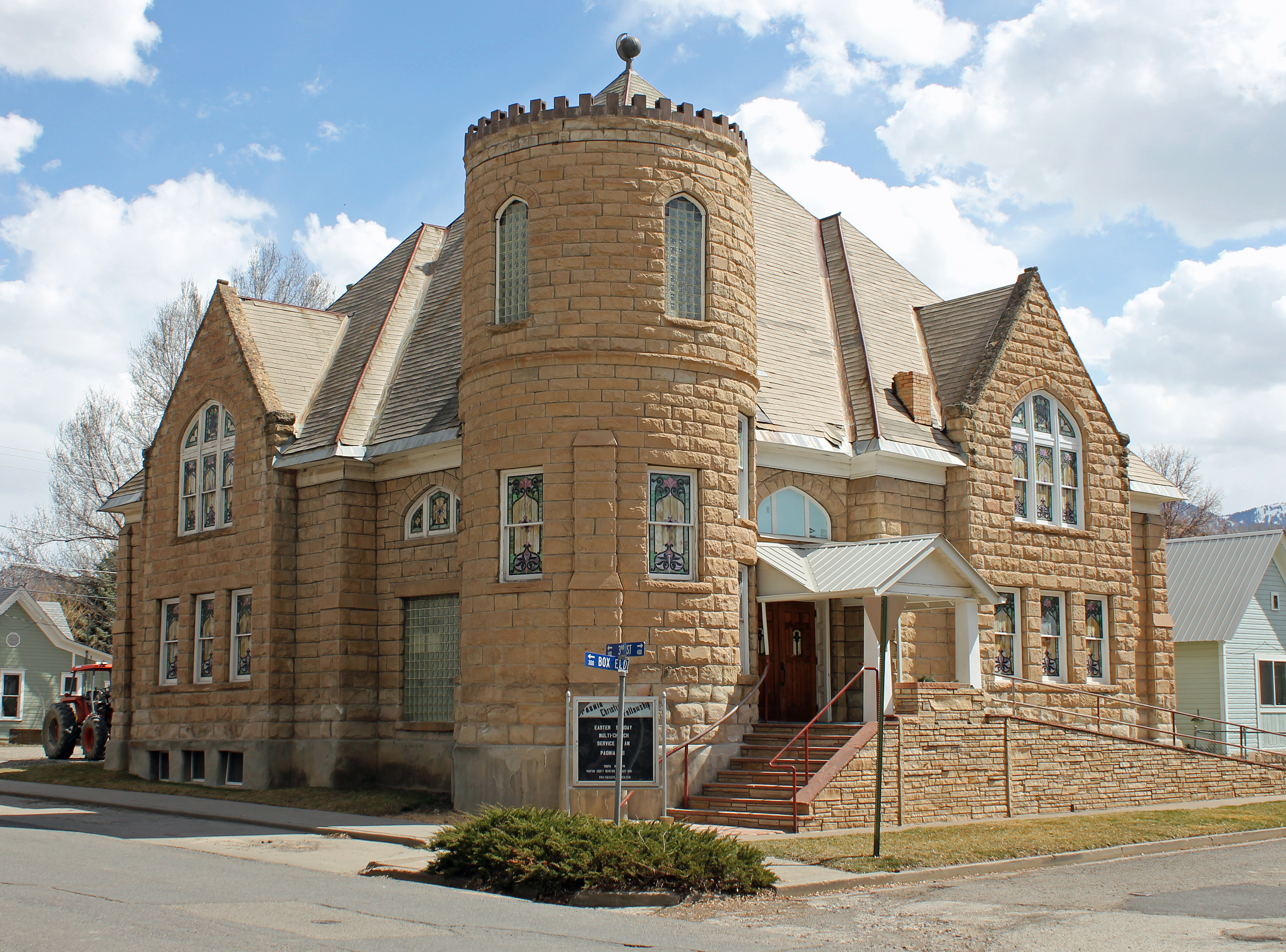

- Location within Colorado Location within the United States
- Location: 235 Box Elder Ave., Paonia, Colorado
- Coordinates: 38°52′05″N 107°35′39″W
- Area: less than one acre
- Architect: Hester, J.K.
- Architectural style: Romanesque
- NRHP reference No.: 11000218
- Added to NRHP: April 27, 2011

The Paonia First Christian Church, at 235 Box Elder Ave. in Paonia, Colorado, was built in. It was listed on the National Register of Historic Places in 2011. It has also been known as Paonia Christian Fellowship.

A local history website describes it:

The Paonia First Christian Church is an excellent example of Romanesque style church as interpreted by local craftsmen. The building, along with several other churches, is in the heart of the residential area of Paonia, which has a long-standing religious identity marked by the high density of churches in the small town. The building is constructed of regularly coursed, rusticated sandstone with distinctive architectural features such as the round, three-story, crenellated tower with a graduated buttress.
