= Garnethurst =

- U.S. National Register of Historic Places
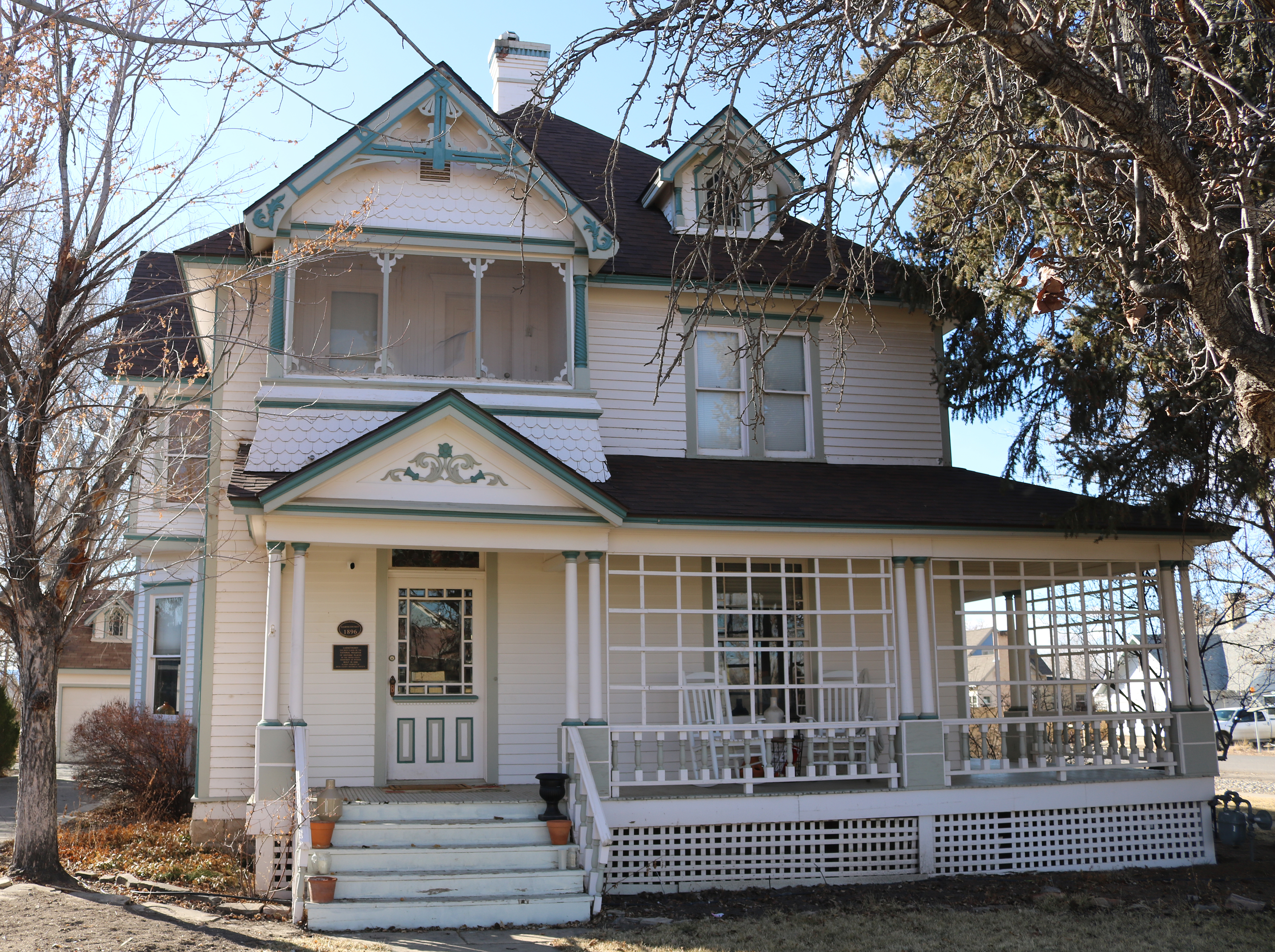
- The property in 2020

- Location within Colorado
- Location: 509 Leon St., Delta, Colorado
- Coordinates: 38°44′25″N 108°03′45″W
- Area: less than one acre
- Built: 1896
- Architectural style: Queen Anne
- NRHP reference No.: 95001245
- Added to NRHP: November 7, 1995

Garnethurst, at 509 Leon St. in Delta, Colorado, is a Queen Anne style house which was built in 1896. It was listed on the National Register of Historic Places in 1995.

It is located on Garnet Mesa, which overlooks the main part of Delta. It was built for Alfred Rufus King (1857-1916) and his family. King, an 1881 graduate of Union College of Law in Chicago, moved from Gunnison to the new town of Delta, formerly Uncompahgre, and become County Attorney in 1883. He was elected County Judge and was long then known as "Judge" King. He also served as mayor. He bought the Garnet Hill property in 1891. After the house was completed in 1896, it was the site of numerous political and social events. King moved to Denver to serve on the state's then-new Court of Appeals from 1911 to 1916.

The house served as the first hospital of Delta from 1915 to 1920, then became a private residence again in 1922.
