= Cory, Colorado =

Unincorporated community in Colorado, US

- Unincorporated community
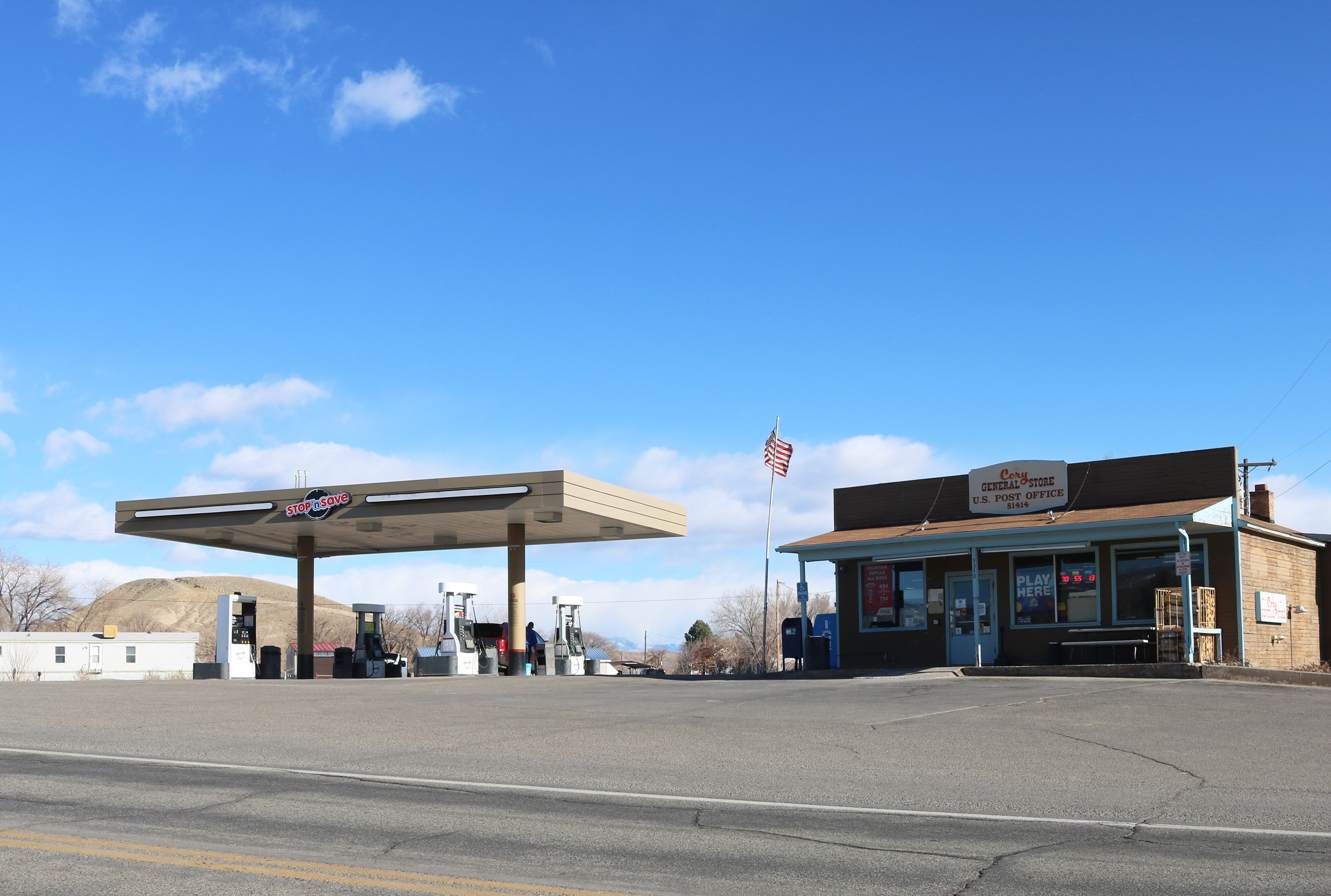
- Cory's general store and post office on Highway 65

- Location of Cory, Colorado. Cory (Colorado)
- Coordinates: 38°47′17″N 107°59′14″W
- Country: United States
- State: Colorado
- County: Delta

Government
  - Type: Unincorporated community
  - Body: Delta County
- Elevation: 5,187 ft (1,581 m)
- Time zone: UTC−07:00 (MST)
  - Summer (DST): UTC−06:00 (MDT)
- ZIP code: 81414
- Area codes: 970/748
- GNIS place ID: 203943

Cory is a small unincorporated community within the boundaries of the incorporated town of Orchard City in Delta County, Colorado, United States. There is a U.S. Post Office in Cory, the ZIP Code for which is 81414.

== History ==
The Cory, Colorado, post office opened on March 12, 1895. An early postmaster gave the community the name of his wife, Cora Hurshman.

== See also ==
- List of populated places in Colorado
