= Colorado State Highway 92 =

State highway in Colorado, United States

State Highway 92
- SH 92 highlighted in red

Route information
- Maintained by CDOT
- Length: 73.22 mi (117.84 km)

Major junctions
- West end: US 50 in Delta
- East end: US 50 near Sapinero

Location
- Country: United States
- State: Colorado
- Counties: Delta, Montrose, Gunnison

Highway system
- Colorado State Highway System; Interstate; US; State; Scenic
← SH 91	→ SH 93

State Highway 92 (SH 92) is a 73.22 miles (117.84 km) long state highway that runs between the small Colorado communities of Hotchkiss and Sapinero. SH 92's western terminus is at US 50 (US 50) in Delta, and the eastern terminus is at US 50 near Sapinero.

== Route description ==
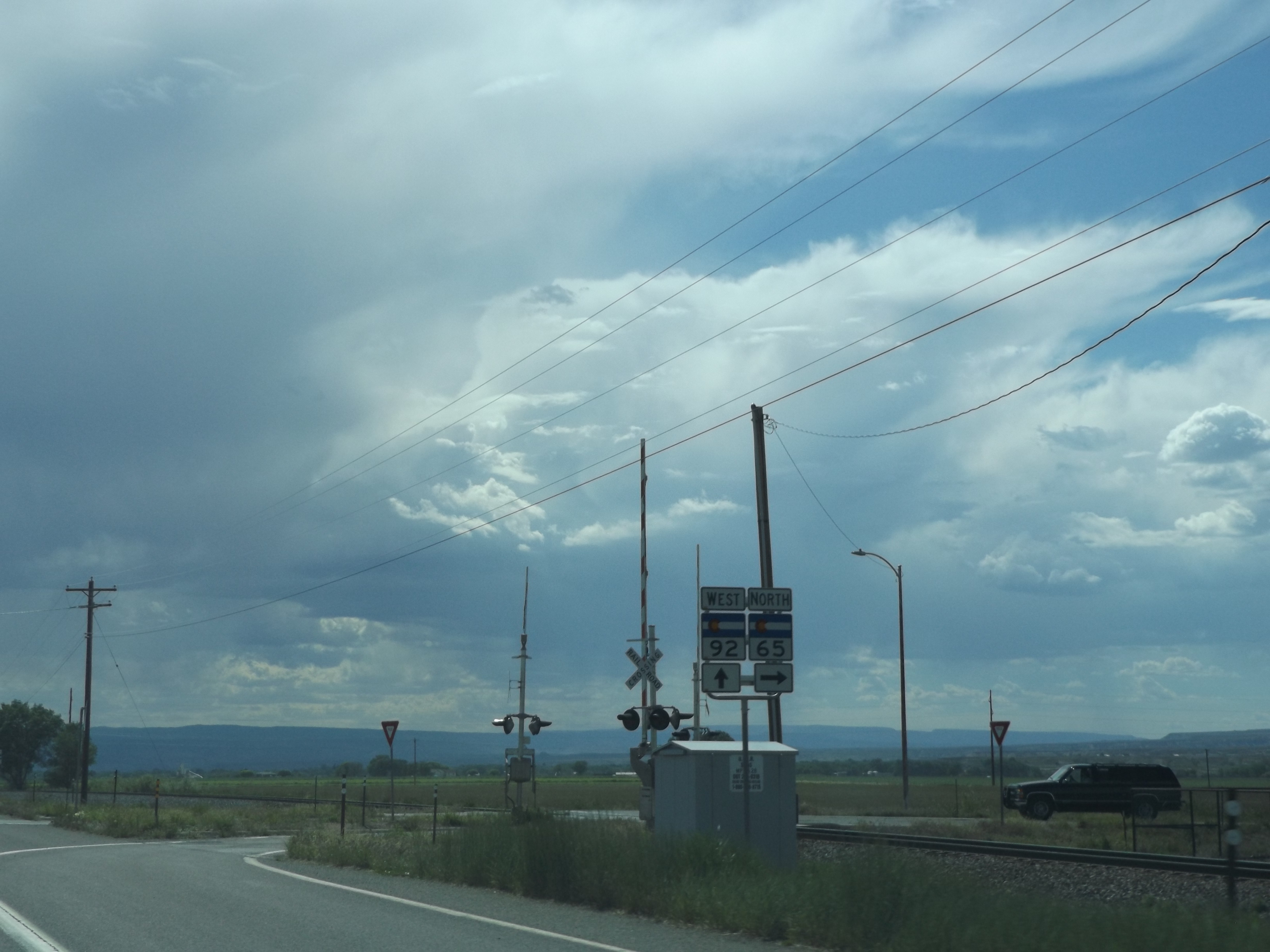
SH 92 at the intersection with SH 65

From SH 92's western terminus at mile 70.919 on US 50 in Delta, it proceeds eastward towards Hotchkiss. In Hotchkiss, it has an intersection with SH 133, and then SH 92 turns to travel in a more southeastern direction. After some time it turns back to the east and enters the Curecanti National Recreation Area. It then crosses the Gunnison River at Blue Mesa Reservoir. Proceeding eastward SH 92 reaches its eastern terminus at mile 131.129 on US 50 in the town of Sapinero

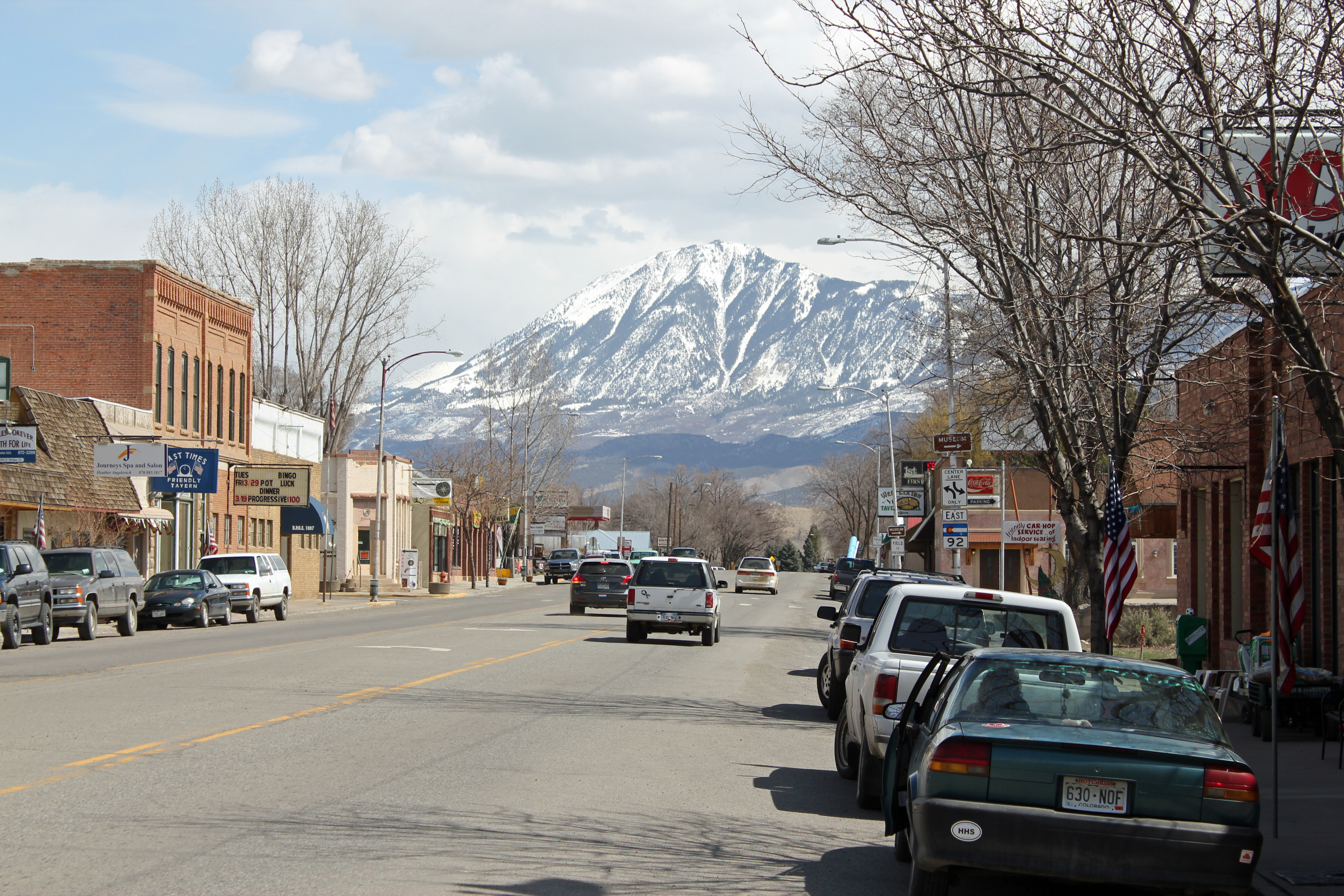
Highway 92 in Hotchkiss, Colorado

== History ==
The route was established in the 1920s and was paved by 1975.

== Major intersections ==
County	Location	mi	km	Destinations	Notes
Delta	Delta	0.000	0.000	US 50 – Montrose, Grand Junction	Western terminus
Delta	Read	3.814	6.138	SH 65 north – Cedaredge, Grand Mesa	Southern terminus of SH 65
Delta	Hotchkiss	20.725	33.354	SH 133 north – Paonia	Southern terminus of SH 133
Gunnison	Sapinero	73.297	117.960	US 50 – Gunnison, Montrose	Eastern terminus
1.000 mi = 1.609 km; 1.000 km = 0.621 mi
