= Mountain Harvest Festival =

Coordinates: 38°52′3″N 107°35′33″W

The Mountain Harvest Festival, established in 2001, is a three-day event in downtown Paonia, Colorado held during the last weekend of September. There are musical acts, poetry, an art show, a chili cook off, a street dance, crafts, wine tasting, as well as classes on canning, raising livestock and sustainable living.

Included in the weekends events are farm tours, workshops in permaculture, beekeeping and raising chickens and goats. The festival, which is also a non-profit organization, is held annually.

The festival went on hiatus in 2020.
