= McClure Pass =

Mountain pass in Colorado, USA

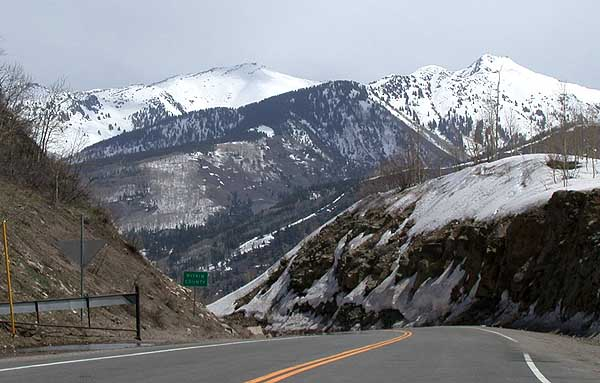
- View north from the summit of McClure Pass towards the Elk Mountains near Marble

- Location within Colorado
- Elevation: 8,755 ft (2,669 m)
- Traversed by: State Highway 133

Third Approach
- Location: Gunnison / Pitkin counties, Colorado, U.S.
- Range: Rocky Mountains
- Coordinates: 39.1288754°N 107.2839398°W
- Topo map: Placita

McClure Pass is a mountain pass in the Rocky Mountains of western Colorado in the United States. It is located along the boundary between Pitkin and Gunnison counties, in a gap at the western side of the Elk Mountains. The pass is at an elevation of 8,755 feet (2,669 m)) and separates the headwaters of the Crystal River (a tributary of the Roaring Fork River) to the east with the headwaters of the North Fork Gunnison River to the west. The pass is named in honor of Thomas "Mack" McClure who in the late 19th Century owned a large house at the eastern base of the pass. The house served as a stage stop where McClure fed and lodged travelers.

The pass is traversed by State Highway 133 between Carbondale and Paonia, providing the direct route between the Roaring Fork Valley and the North Fork Valley. The pass is not especially high and is generally open year-round, closed only during heavy snowstorms. The approaches are fairly steep on each side, with an 8% grade.

== Climate ==
There is a SNOTEL weather station for McClure Pass, situated at an elevation of 9500 ft (2896m). McClure Pass has a humid continental climate (Köppen Dfb), bordering on a subalpine climate (Köppen Dfc).

Climate data for McClure Pass, Colorado, 1991–2020 normals, 1985-2020 extremes: 9500ft (2896m)
Month	Jan	Feb	Mar	Apr	May	Jun	Jul	Aug	Sep	Oct	Nov	Dec	Year
Record high °F (°C)	55 (13)	62 (17)	66 (19)	70 (21)	80 (27)	83 (28)	87 (31)	103 (39)	92 (33)	74 (23)	66 (19)	66 (19)	103 (39)
Mean maximum °F (°C)	46.8 (8.2)	48.7 (9.3)	56.0 (13.3)	62.4 (16.9)	71.2 (21.8)	77.7 (25.4)	80.6 (27.0)	80.0 (26.7)	76.2 (24.6)	68.2 (20.1)	56.5 (13.6)	47.5 (8.6)	82.9 (28.3)
Mean daily maximum °F (°C)	33.6 (0.9)	36.2 (2.3)	43.5 (6.4)	49.2 (9.6)	58.6 (14.8)	68.5 (20.3)	73.4 (23.0)	71.8 (22.1)	65.3 (18.5)	54.2 (12.3)	42.2 (5.7)	33.5 (0.8)	52.5 (11.4)
Daily mean °F (°C)	24.3 (−4.3)	26.6 (−3.0)	33.0 (0.6)	38.5 (3.6)	47.1 (8.4)	56.2 (13.4)	61.2 (16.2)	59.9 (15.5)	53.6 (12.0)	43.5 (6.4)	32.5 (0.3)	24.3 (−4.3)	41.7 (5.4)
Mean daily minimum °F (°C)	14.9 (−9.5)	16.6 (−8.6)	22.7 (−5.2)	27.8 (−2.3)	35.9 (2.2)	43.9 (6.6)	48.9 (9.4)	47.7 (8.7)	41.7 (5.4)	32.5 (0.3)	22.7 (−5.2)	15.1 (−9.4)	30.9 (−0.6)
Mean minimum °F (°C)	−1.3 (−18.5)	0.0 (−17.8)	6.2 (−14.3)	14.4 (−9.8)	24.3 (−4.3)	32.7 (0.4)	40.8 (4.9)	40.6 (4.8)	28.8 (−1.8)	16.1 (−8.8)	4.2 (−15.4)	−2.6 (−19.2)	−6.3 (−21.3)
Record low °F (°C)	−11 (−24)	−20 (−29)	−12 (−24)	5 (−15)	14 (−10)	20 (−7)	29 (−2)	30 (−1)	16 (−9)	−1 (−18)	−10 (−23)	−24 (−31)	−24 (−31)
Average precipitation inches (mm)	3.44 (87)	3.54 (90)	3.34 (85)	3.14 (80)	2.51 (64)	1.22 (31)	1.92 (49)	2.27 (58)	2.52 (64)	2.85 (72)	2.98 (76)	3.32 (84)	33.05 (840)
Average extreme snow depth inches (cm)	45.7 (116)	53.4 (136)	53.4 (136)	41.8 (106)	17.1 (43)	4.6 (12)	8.2 (21)	7.0 (18)	7.0 (18)	6.5 (17)	14.9 (38)	32.9 (84)	55.8 (142)
Average precipitation days (≥ 0.01 in)	14.0	14.0	13.2	12.4	8.5	5.0	7.8	9.8	9.4	9.9	11.6	12.8	128.4
Source 1: XMACIS2(normals, records & 2003-2020 snow depth)
Source 2: NOAA (precip/precip days)
