= Lazear, Colorado =

Census-designated place in Delta County, CO, USA

- Census-designated place
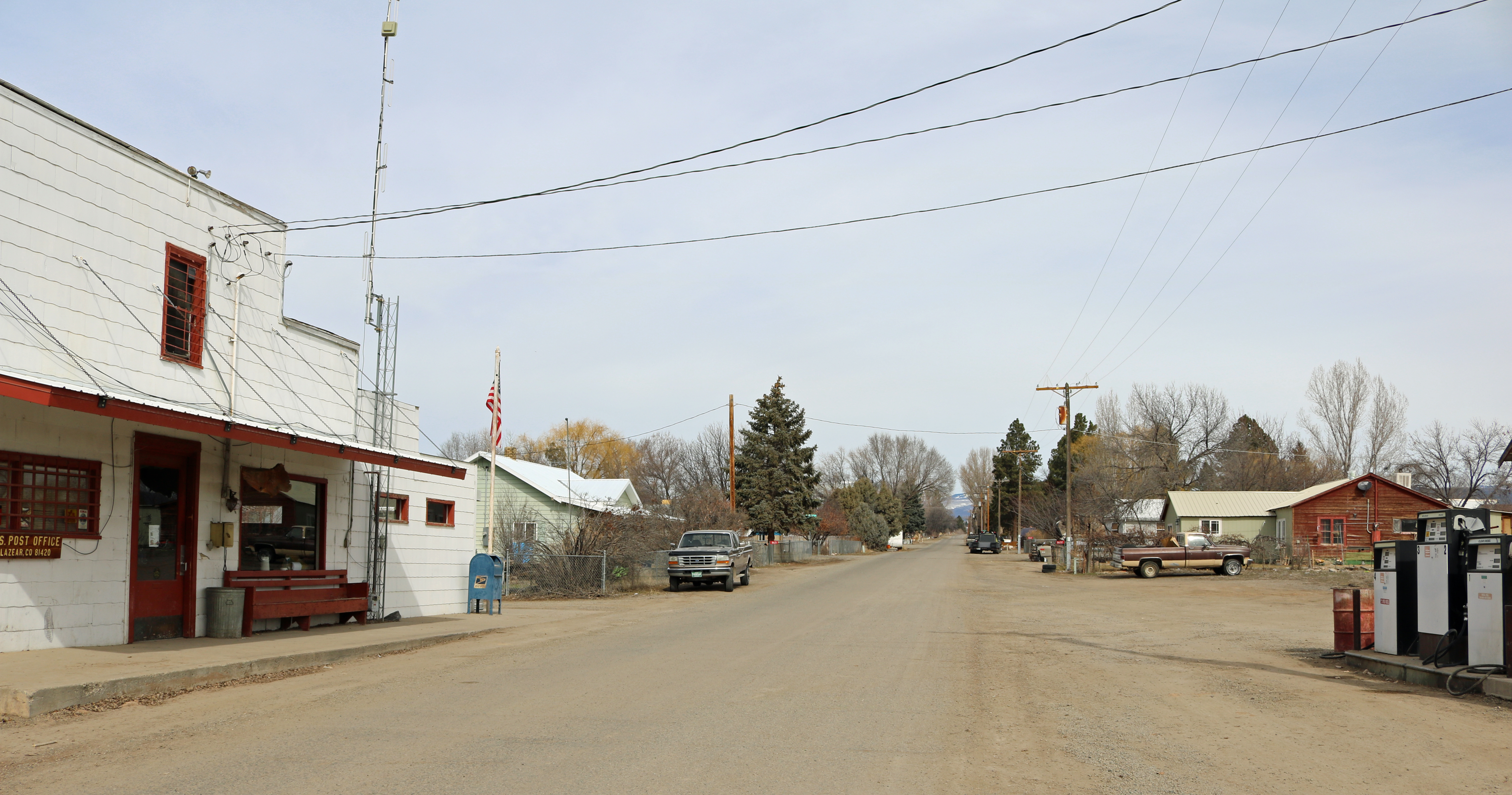
- Looking north on 3100 Road in Lazear.

- Location of the Lazear CDP in the State of Colorado.
- Coordinates: 38°46′44″N 107°46′49″W
- Country: United States
- State: Colorado
- County: Delta

Government
  - Type: Unincorporated town

Area
  - Total: 1.602 sq mi (4.150 km^{2})
  - Land: 1.602 sq mi (4.150 km^{2})
  - Water: 0 sq mi (0.000 km^{2})
- Elevation: 5,440 ft (1,660 m)

Population (2020)
  - Total: 168
  - Density: 105/sq mi (40.5/km^{2})
- Time zone: UTC-7 (MST)
  - Summer (DST): UTC-6 (MDT)
- ZIP Code: 81420
- Area code: 970
- GNIS feature: 2804451

Lazear is an unincorporated town, a census-designated place (CDP), and a post office located in and governed by Delta County, Colorado, United States. The Lazear post office has the ZIP Code 81420 (post office boxes). The population was 168 at the 2020 census.

== History ==
The Lazear Post Office has been in operation since 1912. The community has the name of J. B. Lazear, the original owner of the town site.

== Geography ==
The Lazear CDP has an area of 1,025 acres (4.150 km^{2}), all land.

== Demographics ==
The United States Census Bureau defined the Lazear CDP for the United States Census 2020.

Lazear CDP, Colorado
Year	Pop.	±%
2020	168	—
Source: United States Census Bureau

== See also ==
- Colorado cities and towns
