= Austin, Colorado =

Neighborhood of Orchard City, Delta County, Colorado, United States

- Neighborhood
- Location of Austin, Orchard City, Colorado Austin (Colorado)
- Coordinates: 38°46′52″N 107°57′03″W
- Country: United States
- State: Colorado
- County: Delta
- Town: Orchard City
- Established: 1900

Government
  - Type: Populated place
  - Body: Town of Orchard City
- Elevation: 5,043 ft (1,537 m)
- Time zone: UTC−07:00 (MST)
  - Summer (DST): UTC−06:00 (MDT)
- ZIP Code: 81410
- GNIS pop ID: 203944

Austin is a neighborhood within the boundaries of the incorporated Town of Orchard City in Delta County, Colorado, United States. There is a U.S. Post Office in Austin with the ZIP Code 81410.

== History ==
Ferganchick Orchard Rock Art Site, listed on the National Register of Historic Places, is a prehistoric archaeological site located near Austin. Starting that the beginning of the 1st century, rock art was made at the site by Archaic people, and then Uncompahgre complex and Ute people.

The Austin, Colorado, post office opened on May 19, 1905. The community has the name of Austin E. Miller, an early settler.

== See also ==
- List of populated places in Colorado
- List of post offices in Colorado
