= Delta County, Colorado =

County in Colorado, United States

- County
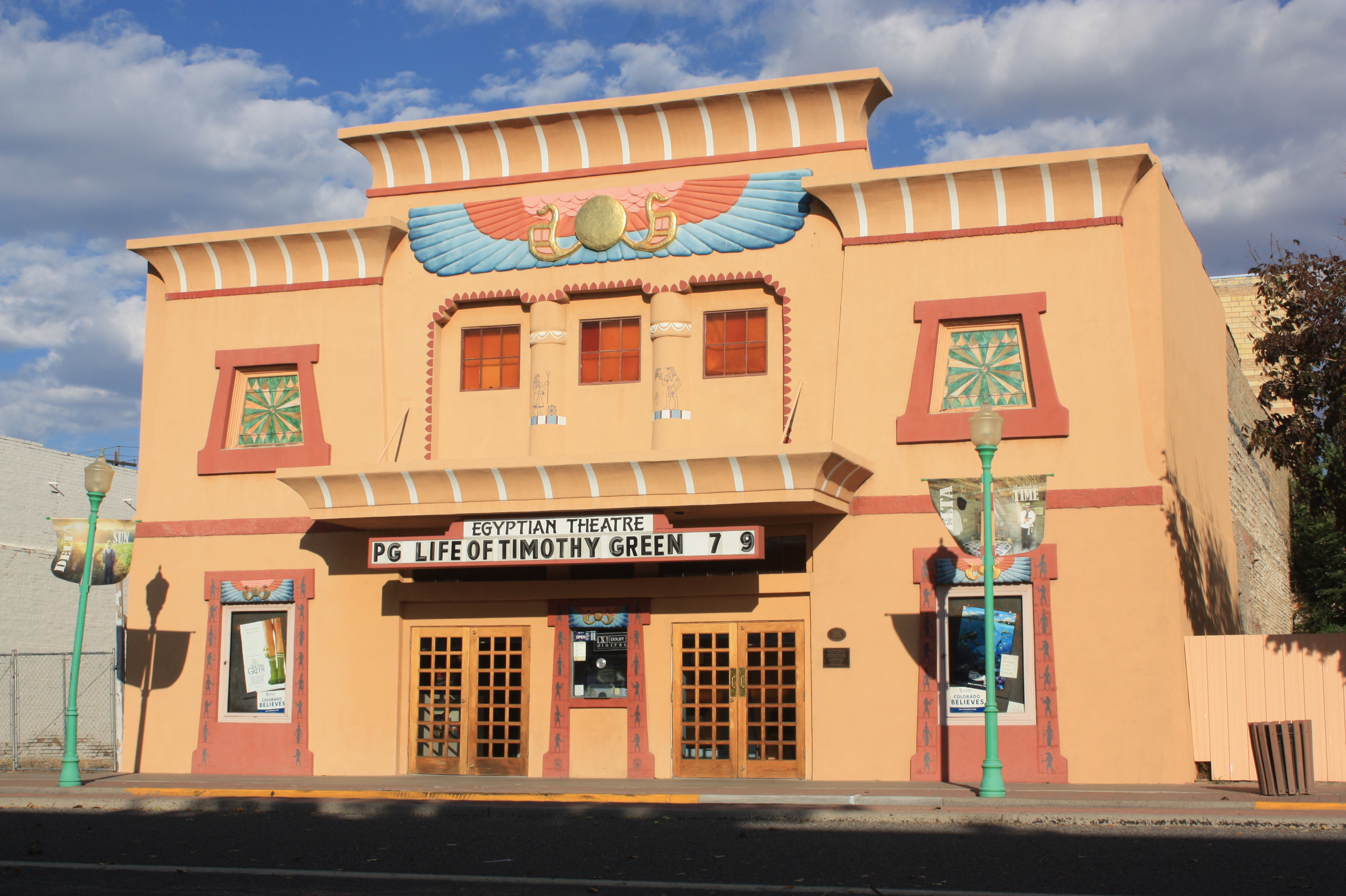
- Egyptian Theatre (Delta, Colorado)

- Location within the U.S. state of Colorado
- Coordinates: 38.86°N 107.86°W
- Country: United States
- State: Colorado
- Founded: February 11, 1883
- Named for: City of Delta, Colorado
- Seat: Delta
- Largest city: Delta

Area
  - Total: 1,149 sq mi (2,980 km^{2})
  - Land: 1,142 sq mi (2,960 km^{2})
  - Water: 6.5 sq mi (17 km^{2}) 0.6%

Population (2020)
  - Total: 31,196
  - Estimate (2025): 32,178 ▲
  - Density: 27/sq mi (10/km^{2})
- Time zone: UTC−7 (Mountain)
  - Summer (DST): UTC−6 (MDT)
- Congressional district: 3rd
- Website: www.deltacountyco.gov

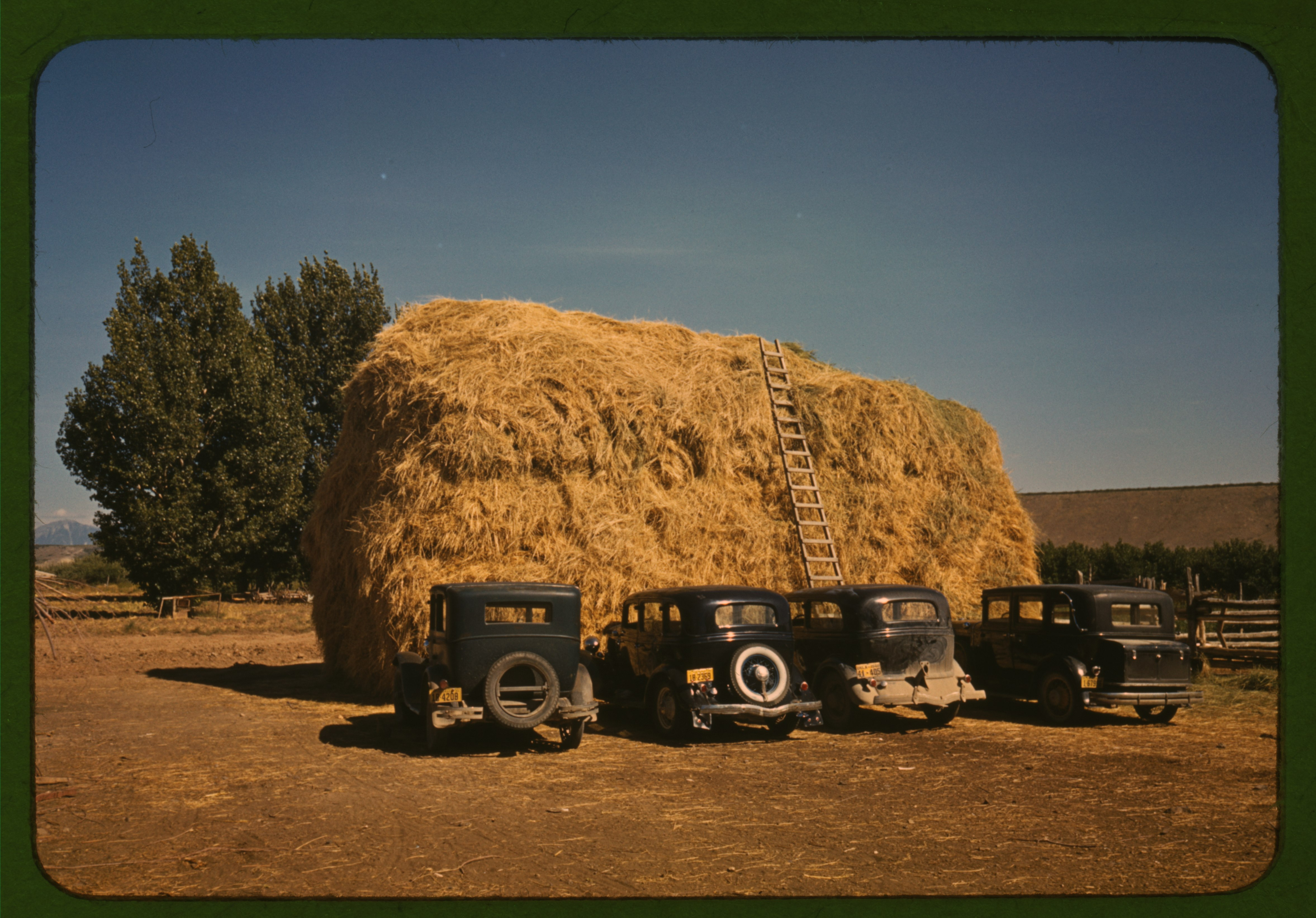
Hay stack and automobiles of peach pickers, Delta County, 1940.

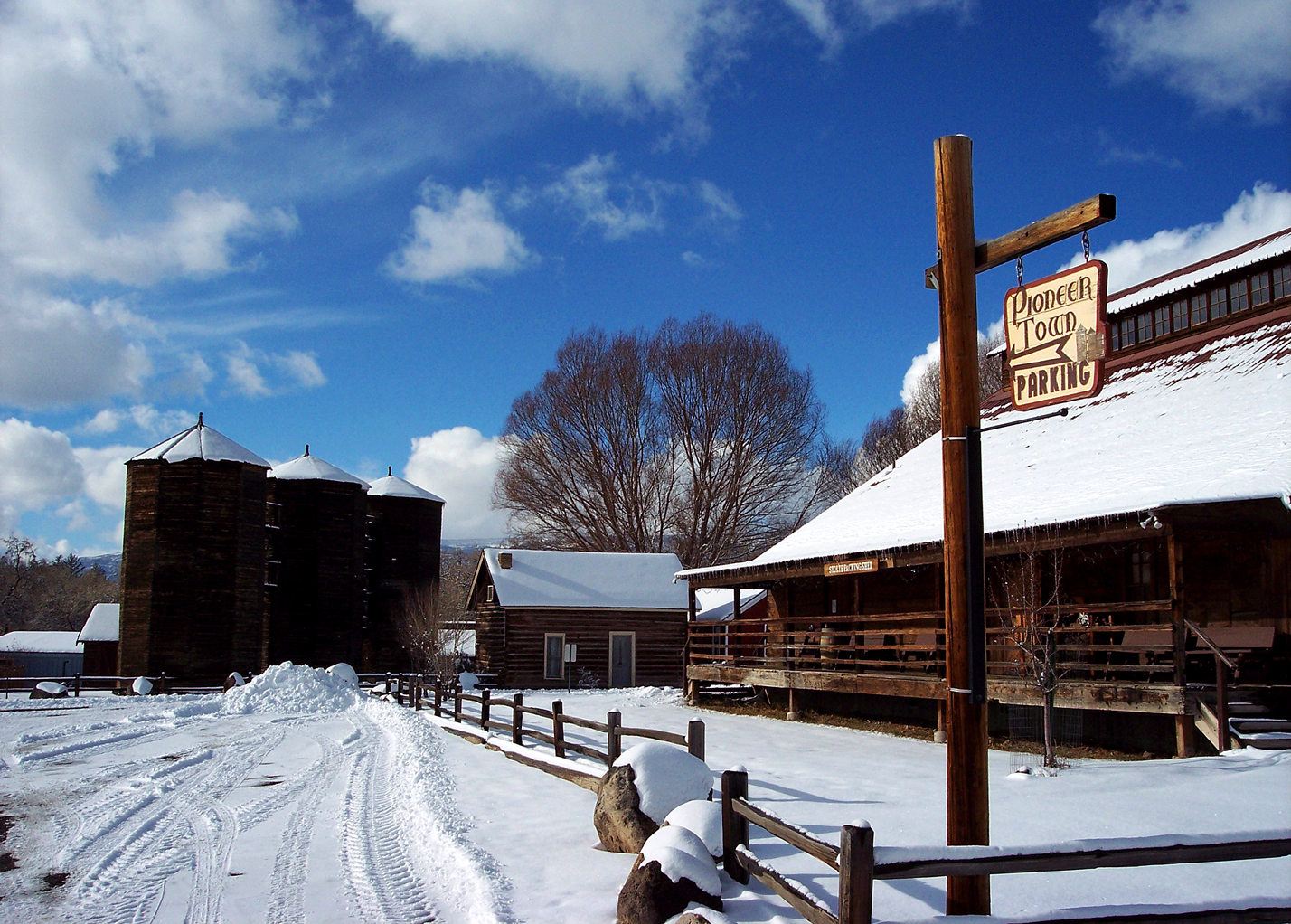
Pioneer Town in Cedaredge, 2008

Delta County is a county located in the U.S. state of Colorado. As of the 2020 census, the population was 31,196. The county seat is Delta.

== History ==
Delta County was created by the Colorado legislature on February 11, 1883, out of portions of central Gunnison County. The county was named from a delta of arable land at the mouth of the Uncompahgre River, where it flows into the Gunnison River.

== Geography ==
According to the U.S. Census Bureau, the county has a total area of 1,149 square miles (2,980 km^{2}), of which 1,142 square miles (2,960 km^{2}) is land and 6.5 square miles (17 km^{2}) (0.6%) is water.

=== Adjacent counties ===
- Mesa County – northwest
- Gunnison County – east
- Montrose County – south

=== Major highways ===
- U.S. Highway 50
- State Highway 65
- State Highway 92
- State Highway 133
- State Highway 348

=== National protected areas ===
- Dominguez Canyon Wilderness
- Dominguez-Escalante National Conservation Area (part)
- Grand Mesa National Forest
- Gunnison Gorge National Conservation Area (part)
- Gunnison Gorge Wilderness
- Gunnison National Forest

=== State protected areas ===
- Crawford State Park
- Sweitzer Lake State Park

=== Trails and byways ===
- American Discovery Trail
- Crag Crest National Recreation Trail
- Old Spanish National Historic Trail
- Grand Mesa Scenic and Historic Byway
- West Elk Loop Scenic Byway

== Demographics ==
Historical population
Census	Pop.	Note	%±
1890	2,534		—
1900	5,487		116.5%
1910	13,688		149.5%
1920	13,668		−0.1%
1930	14,204		3.9%
1940	16,470		16.0%
1950	17,365		5.4%
1960	15,602		−10.2%
1970	15,286		−2.0%
1980	21,225		38.9%
1990	20,980		−1.2%
2000	27,834		32.7%
2010	30,952		11.2%
2020	31,196		0.8%
2025 (est.)	32,178	▲	3.1%
U.S. Decennial Census; 1790-1960 1900-1990; 1990-2000 2010-2020

=== 2020 census ===
As of the 2020 census, the county had a population of 31,196. Of the residents, 19.9% were under the age of 18 and 27.5% were 65 years of age or older; the median age was 48.9 years. For every 100 females there were 100.0 males, and for every 100 females age 18 and over there were 99.7 males. 26.3% of residents lived in urban areas and 73.7% lived in rural areas.

Delta County, Colorado – Racial and ethnic composition Note: the US Census treats Hispanic/Latino as an ethnic category. This table excludes Latinos from the racial categories and assigns them to a separate category. Hispanics/Latinos may be of any race.
Race / Ethnicity (NH = Non-Hispanic)	Pop 2000	Pop 2010	Pop 2020	% 2000	% 2010	% 2020
White alone (NH)	23,945	25,685	24,907	86.03%	82.98%	79.84%
Black or African American alone (NH)	135	137	121	0.48%	0.44%	0.39%
Native American or Alaska Native alone (NH)	150	190	121	0.54%	0.61%	0.39%
Asian alone (NH)	83	146	236	0.30%	0.47%	0.76%
Pacific Islander alone (NH)	7	12	9	0.03%	0.04%	0.03%
Other race alone (NH)	24	41	192	0.09%	0.13%	0.62%
Mixed race or Multiracial (NH)	319	396	1,281	1.15%	1.28%	4.11%
Hispanic or Latino (any race)	3,171	4,345	4,329	11.39%	14.04%	13.88%
Total	27,834	30,952	31,196	100.00%	100.00%	100.00%

The racial makeup of the county was 83.7% White, 0.5% Black or African American, 0.9% American Indian and Alaska Native, 0.8% Asian, 0.0% Native Hawaiian and Pacific Islander, 5.6% from some other race, and 8.4% from two or more races. Hispanic or Latino residents of any race comprised 13.9% of the population.

There were 13,075 households in the county, of which 23.8% had children under the age of 18 living with them and 24.7% had a female householder with no spouse or partner present. About 29.8% of all households were made up of individuals and 17.2% had someone living alone who was 65 years of age or older.

There were 14,780 housing units, of which 11.5% were vacant. Among occupied housing units, 75.6% were owner-occupied and 24.4% were renter-occupied. The homeowner vacancy rate was 1.9% and the rental vacancy rate was 7.4%.

=== 2000 census ===
At the 2000 census there were 27,834 people, 11,058 households, and 7,939 families living in the county. The population density was 24 people per square mile (9.3 people/km^{2}). There were 12,374 housing units at an average density of 11 units per square mile (4.2 units/km^{2}). The racial makeup of the county was 92.29% White, 0.52% Black or African American, 0.76% Native American, 0.32% Asian, 0.03% Pacific Islander, 4.25% from other races, and 1.83% from two or more races. 11.39% of the population were Hispanic or Latino of any race. Of the 11,058 households 29.00% had children under the age of 18 living with them, 60.30% were married couples living together, 7.90% had a female householder with no husband present, and 28.20% were non-families. 24.80% of households were one person and 12.40% were one person aged 65 or older. The average household size was 2.43 and the average family size was 2.89.

The age distribution was 24.00% under the age of 18, 6.30% from 18 to 24, 23.60% from 25 to 44, 26.50% from 45 to 64, and 19.70% 65 or older. The median age was 42 years. For every 100 females there were 100.80 males. For every 100 females age 18 and over, there were 98.60 males.

The median household income was $32,785 and the median family income was $37,748. Males had a median income of $31,348 versus $19,916 for females. The per capita income for the county was $17,152. About 8.50% of families and 12.10% of the population were below the poverty line, including 15.00% of those under age 18 and 9.60% of those age 65 or over.

== Communities ==
=== City ===
- Delta

=== Towns ===
- Cedaredge
- Crawford
- Hotchkiss
- Orchard City
- Paonia

=== Census-designated place ===
- Lazear

=== Unincorporated communities ===
- Austin (Note: The unincorporated communities of Austin, Cory, and Eckert are all within the town limits of Orchard City.)
- Bowie
- Cory
- Eckert

== Politics ==
Delta County votes predominantly Republican in national, state, and local elections. No Democratic presidential candidate has reached forty percent of Delta County's vote since Lyndon Johnson carried the county in 1964, and since 1920 Franklin D. Roosevelt in 1932 is the only other Democrat to gain a majority, although Roosevelt did win a plurality against Alf Landon in 1936.

Delta County is split between two house districts for the Colorado House of Representatives, House District 58 & House District 54. Prior to the redistricting, which took effect in the November 2022 election, Delta County was split by House District 54 & 61.

United States presidential election results for Delta County, Colorado
Year	Republican		Democratic		Third party(ies)	
Year	No.	%	No.	%	No.	%
1884	230	55.96%	174	42.34%	7	1.70%
1888	257	44.01%	239	40.92%	88	15.07%
1892	237	33.05%	0	0.00%	480	66.95%
1896	139	7.79%	1,603	89.85%	42	2.35%
1900	822	35.69%	1,352	58.71%	129	5.60%
1904	1,567	50.65%	1,046	33.81%	481	15.55%
1908	1,838	42.92%	2,006	46.85%	438	10.23%
1912	803	16.28%	1,808	36.67%	2,320	47.05%
1916	1,612	33.75%	2,817	58.97%	348	7.28%
1920	2,596	56.40%	1,750	38.02%	257	5.58%
1924	2,752	54.36%	1,345	26.57%	966	19.08%
1928	3,731	67.32%	1,672	30.17%	139	2.51%
1932	2,341	37.00%	3,467	54.80%	519	8.20%
1936	2,661	41.14%	3,230	49.94%	577	8.92%
1940	4,175	57.07%	3,044	41.61%	96	1.31%
1944	3,462	59.30%	2,351	40.27%	25	0.43%
1948	3,158	48.82%	3,171	49.02%	140	2.16%
1952	4,986	67.01%	2,389	32.11%	66	0.89%
1956	4,531	64.71%	2,458	35.10%	13	0.19%
1960	4,644	63.24%	2,689	36.62%	10	0.14%
1964	2,883	42.24%	3,927	57.53%	16	0.23%
1968	3,692	55.50%	2,327	34.98%	633	9.52%
1972	4,890	67.73%	1,903	26.36%	427	5.91%
1976	4,980	58.82%	3,232	38.17%	255	3.01%
1980	6,179	66.97%	2,348	25.45%	700	7.59%
1984	6,678	69.28%	2,835	29.41%	126	1.31%
1988	5,449	59.59%	3,521	38.51%	174	1.90%
1992	4,359	41.54%	3,424	32.63%	2,711	25.83%
1996	6,047	54.48%	3,584	32.29%	1,469	13.23%
2000	8,372	65.99%	3,264	25.73%	1,050	8.28%
2004	9,722	68.66%	4,224	29.83%	213	1.50%
2008	10,067	65.23%	5,084	32.94%	283	1.83%
2012	10,915	68.54%	4,622	29.02%	388	2.44%
2016	11,655	69.42%	4,087	24.34%	1,048	6.24%
2020	13,081	67.53%	5,887	30.39%	402	2.08%
2024	12,948	66.47%	6,030	30.96%	500	2.57%

United States Senate election results for Delta County, Colorado2
Year	Republican		Democratic		Third party(ies)	
Year	No.	%	No.	%	No.	%
2020	13,118	67.96%	5,764	29.86%	421	2.18%

United States Senate election results for Delta County, Colorado3
Year	Republican		Democratic		Third party(ies)	
Year	No.	%	No.	%	No.	%
2022	9,901	62.22%	5,400	33.93%	613	3.85%

Colorado Gubernatorial election results for Delta County
Year	Republican		Democratic		Third party(ies)	
Year	No.	%	No.	%	No.	%
2022	9,753	61.27%	5,651	35.50%	513	3.22%

== Media ==
The local papers are the Delta County Independent and the Merchant Herald.

== Education ==
There is one school district in the county: Delta County Joint School District 50-J.

=== Elementary Schools ===
- Cedaredge Elementary School
- Garnet Mesa Elementary School (Delta)
- Hotchkiss K-8 School
- Lincoln Elementary School (Delta)
- Paonia K-8 School

=== Middle Schools ===
- Cedaredge Middle School
- Delta Middle School
- Hotchkiss K-8 School
- Paonia K-8 School

=== High Schools ===
- Cedaredge High School
- Delta High School
- North Fork High School (Hotchkiss)

=== Higher Education ===
Technical College of the Rockies, a trade school offering technical training and professional certificates, is located in the city of Delta.

== See also ==
- Bibliography of Colorado
- Geography of Colorado
- History of Colorado
  - National Register of Historic Places listings in Delta County, Colorado
- Index of Colorado-related articles
- List of Colorado-related lists
  - List of counties in Colorado
- Outline of Colorado
  - Delta County Libraries
  - Delta County Memorial Hospital
