= Hotchkiss, Colorado =

Town in Colorado, United States

- Statutory town
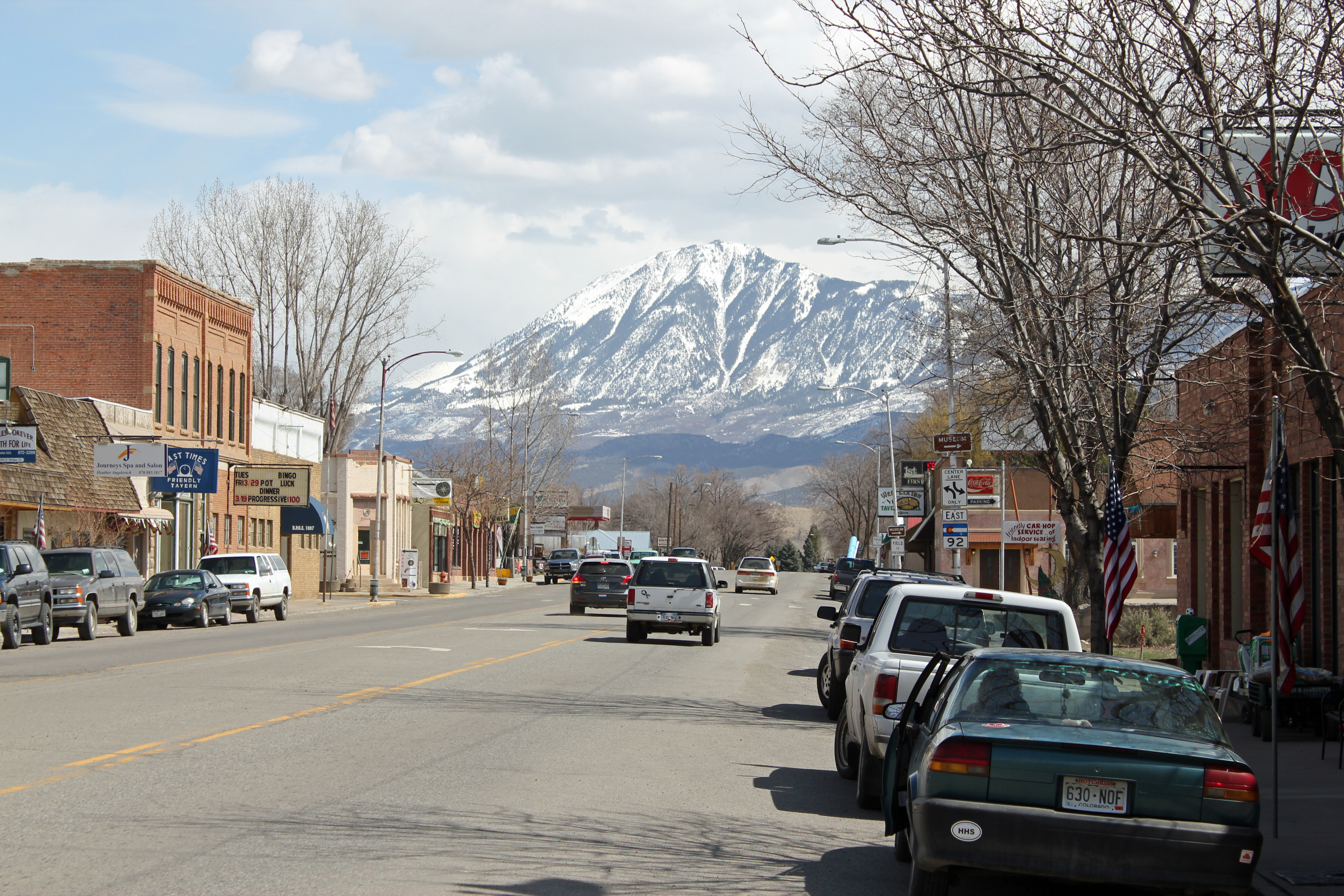
- East Bridge Street in Hotchkiss, looking towards Mount Lamborn
- Motto: "Friendliest Town Around"
- Location of Hotchkiss in Delta County, Colorado.
- Coordinates: 38°47′56″N 107°42′48″W
- Country: United States
- State: Colorado
- County: Delta
- Incorporated (town): March 14, 1901

Government
  - Type: Statutory town

Area
  - Total: 0.93 sq mi (2.40 km^{2})
  - Land: 0.93 sq mi (2.40 km^{2})
  - Water: 0 sq mi (0.00 km^{2})
- Elevation: 5,332 ft (1,625 m)

Population (2020)
  - Total: 875
  - Density: 944/sq mi (365/km^{2})
- Time zone: UTC-7 (MST)
  - Summer (DST): UTC-6 (MDT)
- ZIP code: 81419
- Area code: 970
- FIPS code: 08-37545
- GNIS feature ID: 2412771
- Website: townofhotchkiss.colorado.gov

Hotchkiss is a statutory town in Delta County, Colorado, United States. The population was 875 at the 2020 census.

A post office called Hotchkiss has been in operation since 1882. The town is named after Enos T. Hotchkiss, a local pioneer.

== Geography ==
Hotchkiss is located in eastern Delta County on the north side of the North Fork Gunnison River.

Colorado State Highway 92 passes through the center of town as Bridge Street, leading west 20 miles (32 km) to Delta, the county seat, and southeast 52 miles (84 km) to U.S. Route 50 at Blue Mesa Reservoir. Colorado State Highway 133 starts at the east end of town and leads northeast 66 miles (106 km) over McClure Pass to Carbondale.

According to the United States Census Bureau, the town of Hotchkiss has a total area of 0.93 square miles (2.4 km^{2}), all of it land.

== Demographics ==
Historical population
Census	Pop.	Note	%±
1900	261		—
1910	600		129.9%
1920	572		−4.7%
1930	541		−5.4%
1940	653		20.7%
1950	715		9.5%
1960	626		−12.4%
1970	507		−19.0%
1980	849		67.5%
1990	744		−12.4%
2000	968		30.1%
2010	944		−2.5%
2020	875		−7.3%

=== Schools ===
The Delta County School District Board of Education decided in February 2021 to close separate high schools in Hotchkiss and Paonia, Colorado and build a joint high school, North Fork High School, located in Hotchkiss. Both schools have been losing students as coal mines in the area have closed. Kindergarten to 8th grade education will continue in both communities.

== See also ==
- Colorado municipalities
