= Delta, Colorado =

City in Colorado, US

- Home rule city
- Main Street in Delta (2005)
- Nickname: City of Murals
- Location within Delta County and Colorado
- Coordinates: 38°44′50″N 108°05′45″W
- Country: United States
- State: Colorado
- County: Delta
- Incorporated: October 24, 1882

Government
  - Type: Home rule city

Area
  - Total: 13.530 sq mi (35.043 km^{2})
  - Land: 13.273 sq mi (34.378 km^{2})
  - Water: 0.257 sq mi (0.665 km^{2})
- Elevation: 4,961 ft (1,512 m)

Population (2020)
  - Total: 9,035
  - Density: 681/sq mi (263/km^{2})
- Time zone: UTC−07:00 (MST)
  - Summer (DST): UTC−06:00 (MDT)
- ZIP code: 81416
- Area codes: 970/748
- GNIS city ID: 2410319
- FIPS code: 19850
- Website: cityofdelta.net

Delta is a home rule city that is the county seat of and the most populous municipality in Delta County, Colorado, United States. The city population was 9,035 at the 2020 United States census. The United States Forest Service headquarters of the Grand Mesa, Gunnison, and Uncompahgre National Forests are located in Delta.

== History ==
Delta was built as a trading post for the Ute people and early settlers. Fort Uncompahgre was built in 1828.

The Delta, Colorado, post office opened on January 5, 1882, and the Town of Delta was incorporated on October 24, 1882. The town was named because of its location on the delta where the Uncompahgre River flows into the Gunnison River.

== Geography ==
Delta is located in southwestern Delta County. The downtown area is situated south of the Gunnison River and east of the Uncompahgre River. The city limits extend north across the Gunnison into the area now known as "North Delta", then west 6 miles (10 km) along U.S. Route 50 as far as Westwinds Airport.

At the 2020 United States census, the town had a total area of 8,659 acres (35.043 km^{2}) including 164 acres (0.665 km^{2}) of water.

Delta is part of the Colorado Western Slope region.

== Demographics ==
Historical population
Census	Pop.	Note	%±
1890	470		—
1900	819		74.3%
1910	2,388		191.6%
1920	2,623		9.8%
1930	2,938		12.0%
1940	3,717		26.5%
1950	4,097		10.2%
1960	3,832		−6.5%
1970	3,694		−3.6%
1980	3,931		6.4%
1990	3,789		−3.6%
2000	6,400		68.9%
2010	8,915		39.3%
2020	9,035		1.3%
U.S. Decennial Census

=== 2020 census ===
As of the 2020 census, Delta had a population of 9,035. The median age was 40.6 years. 23.8% of residents were under the age of 18 and 21.8% of residents were 65 years of age or older. For every 100 females there were 94.1 males, and for every 100 females age 18 and over there were 92.5 males age 18 and over.

89.1% of residents lived in urban areas, while 10.9% lived in rural areas.

There were 3,670 households in Delta, of which 28.9% had children under the age of 18 living in them. Of all households, 44.3% were married-couple households, 19.9% were households with a male householder and no spouse or partner present, and 30.2% were households with a female householder and no spouse or partner present. About 31.7% of all households were made up of individuals and 16.9% had someone living alone who was 65 years of age or older.

There were 3,931 housing units, of which 6.6% were vacant. The homeowner vacancy rate was 1.4% and the rental vacancy rate was 7.1%.

Racial composition as of the 2020 census
Race	Number	Percent
White	6,776	75.0%
Black or African American	39	0.4%
American Indian and Alaska Native	116	1.3%
Asian	155	1.7%
Native Hawaiian and Other Pacific Islander	2	0.0%
Some other race	836	9.3%
Two or more races	1,111	12.3%
Hispanic or Latino (of any race)	2,182	24.2%

=== 2010 census ===
As of the 2010 census, there were 8,915 people, 3,530 households, and 2,337 families living in the city. The population density was 1,682.1 inhabitants per square mile (649.5/km^{2}). There were 3,825 housing units at an average density of 721.7 per square mile (278.6/km^{2}). The racial makeup of the city was 82.2% White, 0.2% African American, 1.1% Native American, 0.7% Asian, 12.5% from other races, and 3.1% from two or more races. Hispanic or Latino of any race were 26.1% of the population.

There were 3,530 households, out of which 30.3% had children under the age of 18 living with them, 49.3% were married couples living together, 11.6% had a female householder with no husband present, and 33.8% were non-families. 30.0% of all households were made up of individuals, and 14.8% had someone living alone who was 65 years of age or older. The average household size was 2.49, and the average family size was 3.08.

In the city, the population was spread out, with 26.7% under the age of 18, 8.2% from 18 to 24, 23.2% from 25 to 44, 24.5% from 45 to 64, and 17.5% who were 65 years of age or older. The median age was 38.0 years. For every 100 females, there were 93.8 males. For every 100 females age 18 and over, there were 91.0 males.

== Art and culture ==
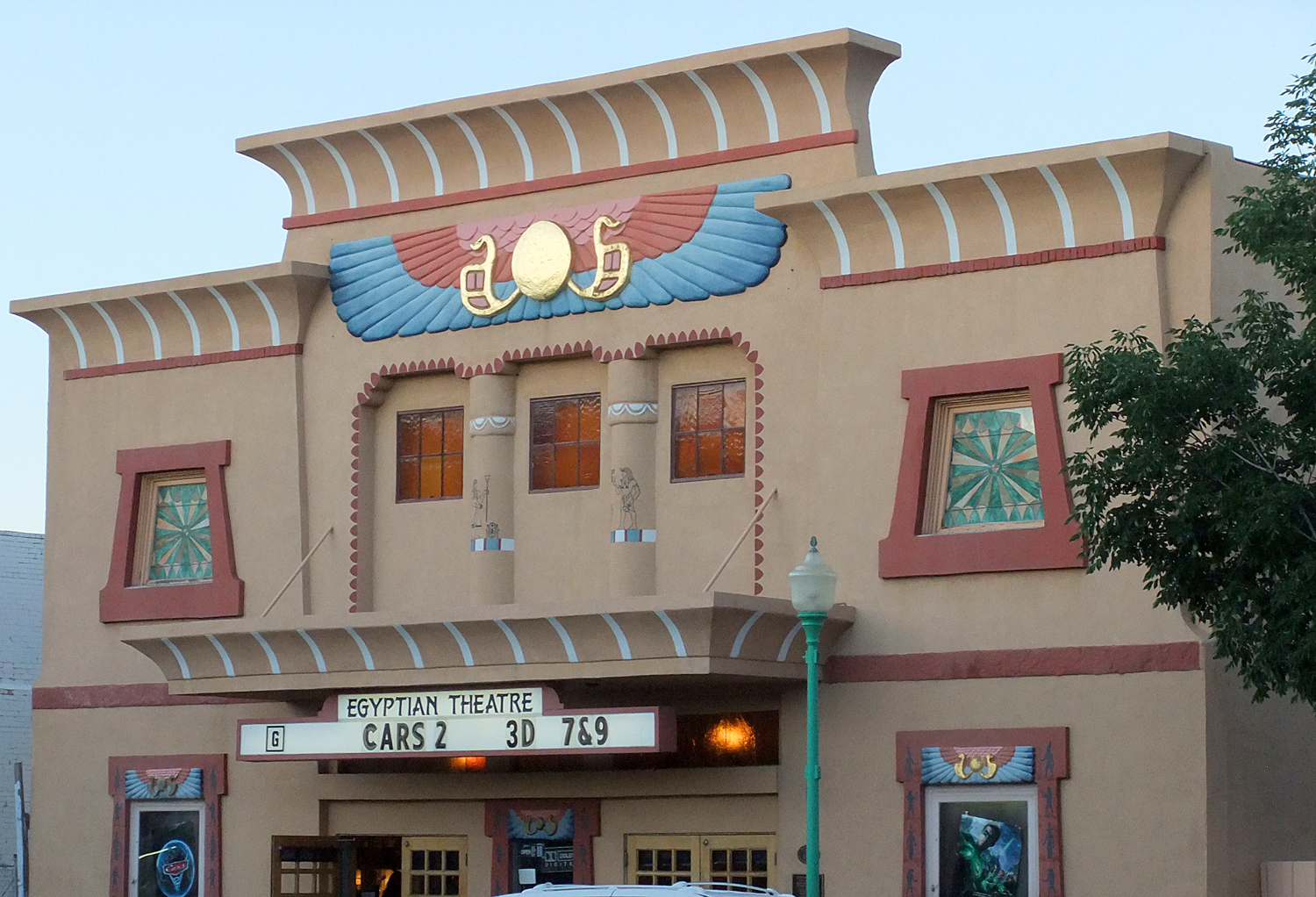
Historic Egyptian Theatre (2012)

Fort Uncompahgre was built in 1828, established as a fur trading post by Antoine Robidoux. Tour guides dress in period attire and trap beavers, make buckskins, knap arrowheads, and work the forge.

=== Tourism ===
Parks:

- Pow Wow Arbor
- Mountain View Pavilion
- Riley Pavilion / Cleland Park
- Shade Pavilion Island
- Cottonwood Park
- Emerald Hills Park

== Education ==
Delta is part of the Delta County Joint School District 50-J, which covers all of Delta County, including Cedaredge, Crawford, Hotchkiss, and Paonia. The school district serves 4,792 students as of the 2020-2021 academic year. Four schools are operated in Delta:

- Garnet Mesa Elementary School
- Lincoln Elementary School
- Delta Middle School
- Delta High School

Delta is also home to Technical College of the Rockies, a small trade school serving roughly 300 students annually.

== Infrastructure ==
=== Transportation ===
Montrose Regional Airport, located 21 miles (34 km) south of Delta, is the closest airport served by scheduled airlines. In Grand Junction, which is 39 miles (63 km) to the north, there are also scheduled airline services, as well as an Amtrak train station with a daily California Zephyr departure in each direction. Delta is part of Colorado's Bustang network. It is on the Durango-Grand Junction Outrider line.

=== Major highways ===
- U.S. Highway 50 runs east-west, crossing 12 states and linking Sacramento, California, with Ocean City, Maryland. In Colorado, it passes through Delta as Main Street and connects the city to Montrose, Grand Junction and Pueblo.
- State Highway 65 is a 61-mile (98 km) stretch that runs north from State Highway 92 east of Delta, over the Grand Mesa, to Interstate 70 near Palisade.
- State Highway 92 begins in Delta, at the intersection of Main Street and First Street. It runs 73 miles (117 km) to the east, re-encountering US 50 near Blue Mesa Reservoir and Curecanti National Recreation Area.

=== Health care ===
Delta County Memorial Hospital serves the city and the surrounding area. In addition to the main hospital, seven specialty clinics are available.

== Media ==
The principal newspaper is the Delta County Independent, which is published weekly on Wednesdays. Local readers also enjoy The High Country Spotlight & Shopper, a free paper that distributes over 15,000 copies throughout the county.

== Notable people ==
- Chuck Cottier, baseball player and manager
- Dale Ishimoto, American actor
- Frank H. Ono, Medal of Honor recipient
- Matt Soper, Colorado Representative, House District 54
- Felix L. Sparks, Colorado Supreme Court justice, U.S. Army colonel

== See also ==
- List of county seats in Colorado
