= Paonia, Colorado =

Town in Colorado, United States

- Town
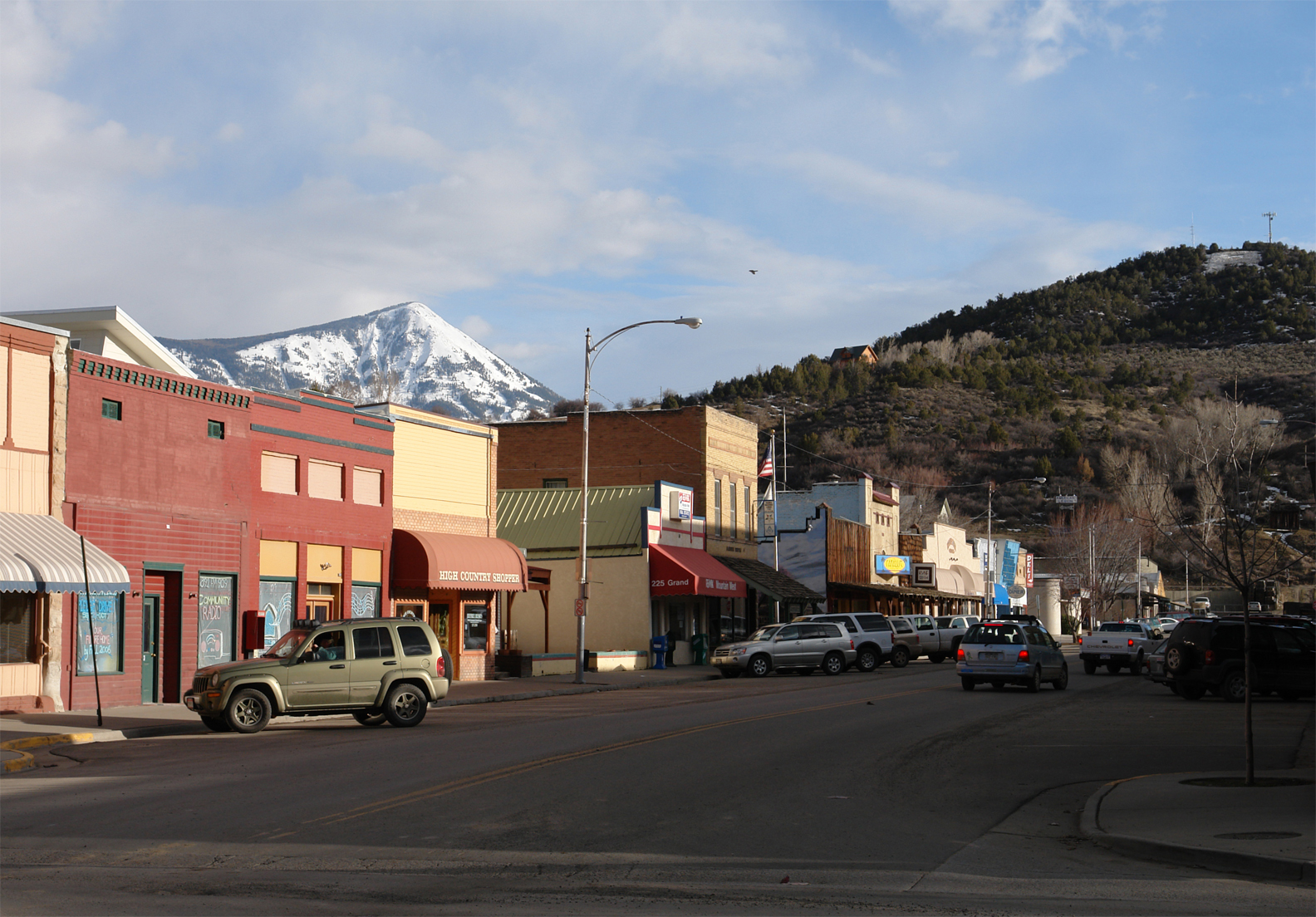
- Paonia's Grand Avenue, looking south

- Location of Paonia in Delta County, Colorado.
- Coordinates: 38°52′22″N 107°35′45″W
- Country: United States
- State: Colorado
- County: Delta
- Settled: 1880
- Incorporated (town): September 3, 1902

Government
  - Type: Statutory town

Area
  - Total: 0.82 sq mi (2.13 km^{2})
  - Land: 0.82 sq mi (2.13 km^{2})
  - Water: 0 sq mi (0.00 km^{2})
- Elevation: 5,676 ft (1,730 m)

Population (2020)
  - Total: 1,447
  - Density: 1,760/sq mi (679/km^{2})
- Time zone: UTC-7 (Mountain (MST))
  - Summer (DST): UTC-6 (MDT)
- ZIP code: 81428
- Area code: 970
- FIPS code: 08-57300
- GNIS feature ID: 2413109
- Website: townofpaonia.colorado.gov

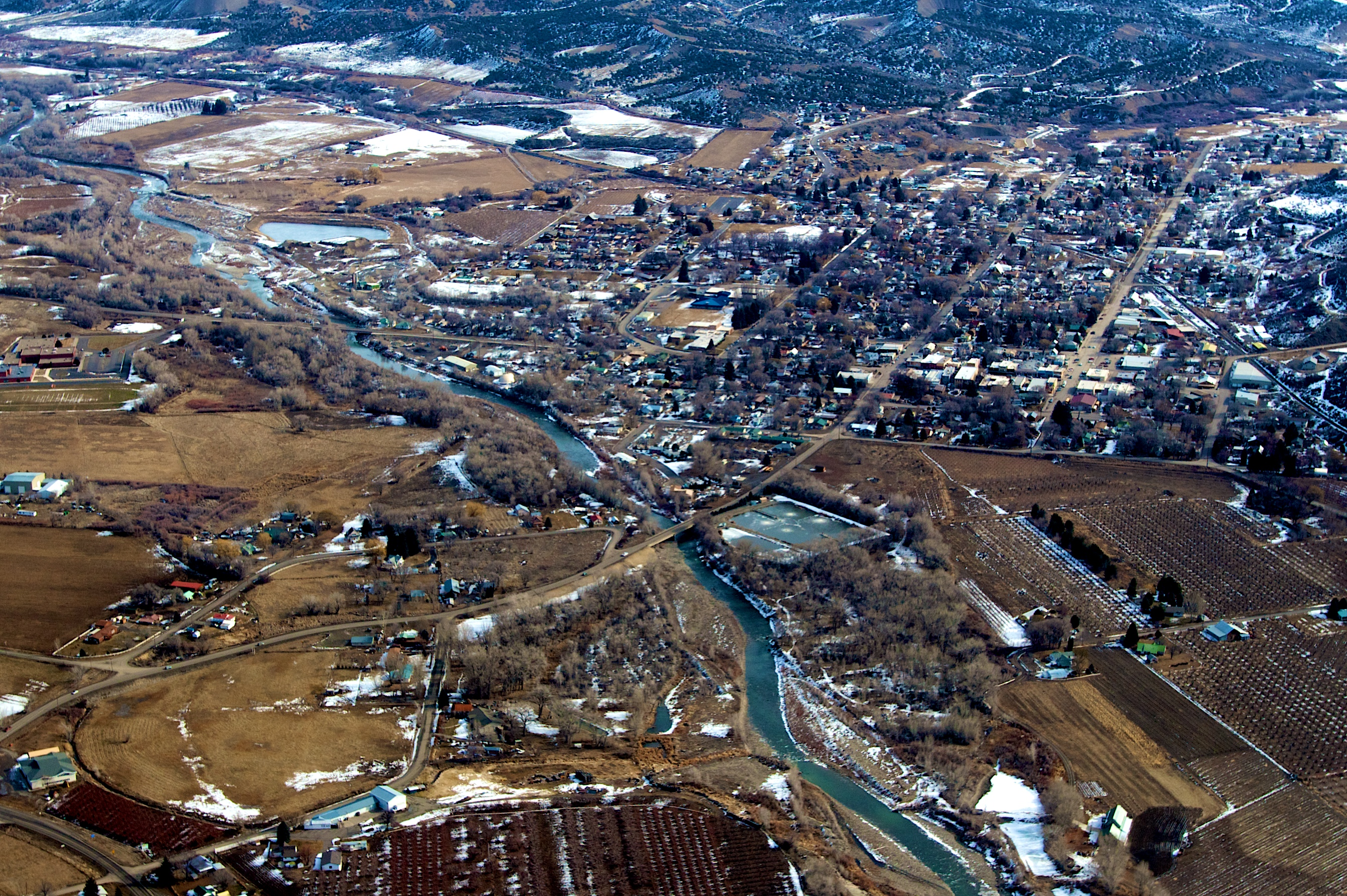
Aerial photo of Paonia, 2009

Paonia is a statutory town in Delta County, Colorado, United States. The population was 1,447 at the 2020 census.

== History ==
Captain John W. Gunnison of the United States Army became the first European American to explore the area in 1853. Gunnison was on an expedition for the Corps of Topographical Engineers to locate a suitable pass through the Rocky Mountains.

The North Fork Valley was inhabited by the Ute people until 1880, when the Ute Indian Reservation was closed by the federal government following the infamous Meeker Massacre.

Following the closure of the reservation, the site was settled in 1880 by Samuel Wade and William Clark, who had accompanied Enos Hotchkiss to the area. The town was officially incorporated in 1902 and had its first election in July of that year. The peony roots that Samuel Wade brought with him to Colorado in 1881 inspired him to submit the Latin name for peony, Paeonia, as a town name. The post office would not allow the extra vowel, so "Paeonia" became "Paonia". The full name of the flower is Paeonia mascula.

== Geography ==
Paonia is located in eastern Delta County. It is situated on the North Fork Gunnison River ("North Fork River"), about 10 miles (16 km) northeast of (upstream from) neighboring Hotchkiss. It lies near the head of the North Fork Valley, an area about 150 miles (240 km) by air southwest of Denver. The valley lies at the foot of 11,396-foot (3,474 m) Mount Lamborn to the southeast and the Grand Mesa to the northwest.

Colorado State Highway 133 touches the northwest boundary of Paonia as the highway runs up the North Fork Valley; it leads southwest 9 miles (14 km) to Hotchkiss and northeast 58 miles (93 km) over McClure Pass to Carbondale.

According to the United States Census Bureau, the town of Paonia has a total area of 0.85 square miles (2.2 km^{2}), all of it land.

== Demographics ==
Historical population
Census	Pop.	Note	%±
1910	1,007		—
1920	925		−8.1%
1930	958		3.6%
1940	1,117		16.6%
1950	1,257		12.5%
1960	1,083		−13.8%
1970	1,161		7.2%
1980	1,425		22.7%
1990	1,403		−1.5%
2000	1,497		6.7%
2010	1,451		−3.1%
2020	1,447		−0.3%

=== 2020 census ===
As of the 2020 census, Paonia had a population of 1,447. The median age was 49.1 years. 19.6% of residents were under the age of 18 and 28.1% of residents were 65 years of age or older. For every 100 females there were 92.9 males, and for every 100 females age 18 and over there were 89.1 males age 18 and over.

0.0% of residents lived in urban areas, while 100.0% lived in rural areas.

There were 655 households in Paonia, of which 24.1% had children under the age of 18 living in them. Of all households, 36.0% were married-couple households, 23.1% were households with a male householder and no spouse or partner present, and 34.5% were households with a female householder and no spouse or partner present. About 38.6% of all households were made up of individuals and 21.3% had someone living alone who was 65 years of age or older.

There were 749 housing units, of which 12.6% were vacant. The homeowner vacancy rate was 2.7% and the rental vacancy rate was 12.2%.

Racial composition as of the 2020 census
Race	Number	Percent
White	1,279	88.4%
Black or African American	7	0.5%
American Indian and Alaska Native	8	0.6%
Asian	6	0.4%
Native Hawaiian and Other Pacific Islander	0	0.0%
Some other race	42	2.9%
Two or more races	105	7.3%
Hispanic or Latino (of any race)	102	7.0%

== Economy ==
=== Coal mining ===
The valley's principal coal mines are all now closed except for Arch Coal's West Elk Mine, Bucyrus International, a supplier of underground coal mining equipment, operates a small warehouse in Paonia for support of the underground longwall systems that are operating in the North Fork valley. Union Pacific provides service to the mine, loading 100 car trains in two hours. The most recent mine closure shuttered Bowie #2 Mine.

The community has mounted legal challenges to proposed oil and gas drilling fracking in the surrounding North Fork Valley.

=== Agriculture ===
The area around Paonia is known for its orchards which produce peaches, apples, cherries, pears, and plums. In addition, several vineyards and wineries have been established in the area, and are some of the highest wineries in North America. Five of the more well-known wineries are Alfred Eames Winery, Black Bridge Winery, Stone Cottage Cellars, Azura Cellars, and Endless Endeavor Winery. This is one of the few regions of Colorado that has successfully cultivated and bottled a pinot noir. The Paonia wineries are part of the West Elk Wineries Trail and annual Tour held the second week of June.

=== Schools ===
The Delta County School District Board of Education decided in February 2021 to close separate high schools in Paonia and Hotchkiss, Colorado, and build a joint high school, North Fork High School, located in Hotchkiss. Both schools have been losing students as coal mines in the area have closed. Kindergarten to 8th grade education will continue in both communities.

=== Media ===
The noted Western newspaper, High Country News, is based in Paonia. High Country News reports on the western United States and is focused on the environment, land use, and public lands issues.

Community radio station KVNF was founded in Paonia and continues to have studios in downtown Paonia. KVNF also now serves a number of towns in the North Fork and Uncompaghre valleys in western Colorado through a network of stations and translators.

Paonia does not have a local newspaper. It is served by The North Fork Times, formerly an independent paper and now a section in the Delta County Independent. The area is also served by the monthly North Fork Merchant Herald, published in nearby Hotchkiss. The weekly Mountain Valley News was published in Cedaredge and distributed widely throughout Delta County, but closed in September 2013. Their sister publication, The High Country Shopper, is published in Paonia.

== Climate ==
Paonia has a humid continental climate (Dfb) with hot summers and moderately cold winters. On average, Paonia has 246 sunny days per year. Paonia averages 14 inches of rain and 53 inches of snow per year. The average July high is 89 °F and the average January low is 14 °F.

Climate data for Paonia, Colorado (1930–1957)
Month	Jan	Feb	Mar	Apr	May	Jun	Jul	Aug	Sep	Oct	Nov	Dec	Year
Mean daily maximum °F (°C)	38.6 (3.7)	42.4 (5.8)	50.4 (10.2)	60.9 (16.1)	70.8 (21.6)	81.5 (27.5)	88.9 (31.6)	86.7 (30.4)	78.8 (26.0)	67.0 (19.4)	51.1 (10.6)	41.0 (5.0)	63.2 (17.3)
Mean daily minimum °F (°C)	14.4 (−9.8)	17.9 (−7.8)	24.9 (−3.9)	33.4 (0.8)	40.6 (4.8)	47.0 (8.3)	53.4 (11.9)	51.7 (10.9)	44.9 (7.2)	35.5 (1.9)	23.7 (−4.6)	16.6 (−8.6)	33.7 (0.9)
Average precipitation inches (mm)	1.33 (34)	1.30 (33)	1.13 (29)	1.56 (40)	0.99 (25)	0.71 (18)	0.86 (22)	1.21 (31)	1.16 (29)	1.36 (35)	1.08 (27)	1.32 (34)	14.02 (356)
Average snowfall inches (cm)	13.7 (35)	11.3 (29)	7.6 (19)	3.2 (8.1)	0.2 (0.51)	0.0 (0.0)	0.0 (0.0)	0.0 (0.0)	0.0 (0.0)	0.5 (1.3)	5.5 (14)	10.8 (27)	52.8 (134)
Source: WRCC

== Festivities ==
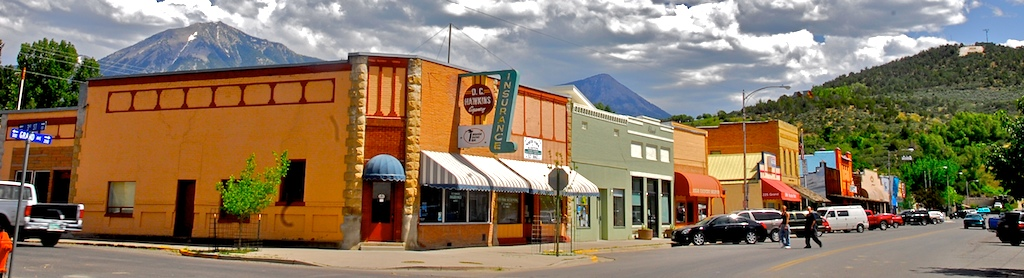
Corner of 3rd and Grand in Paonia, 2009

=== Paonia Cherry Days Festival ===
Paonia celebrates its "Cherry Days" festival annually on the week of July 4. It features parades, family and class reunions, games, arts and crafts, and musical performances. Paonia Cherry Days is one of the longest running outdoor festivals in Colorado. Started by the Paonia Lions Club in 1946, the festival continues to be run by community volunteers.

=== Mountain Harvest Festival ===
The Mountain Harvest Festival is a three-day event in downtown Paonia held during the last weekend of September. There are over 20 musical acts, poetry, an art show, a chili cook off, a street dance, crafts, wine tasting, as well as classes on canning, raising livestock, and sustainable living.

=== Rainbow Gathering ===
In 1992 the annual Rainbow Gathering was held at nearby Overland Reservoir. An estimated 18,275 people converged on the site and lived in temporary dwellings for the summer. Although the reservoir is 27 miles (43 km) from Paonia, it had a significant impact on all the towns in the North Fork Valley, including Paonia. Many "New Agers" and members of the psychedelic community continue to reside in and around Paonia, which was the boyhood home of one of the voices and key figures of "ecstatic state" knowledge, Terence McKenna.

=== Paonia Film Festival ===
The Paradise Theater in downtown Paonia hosts a biennial film festival. The Paonia Film Festival celebrates the beauty of the Western Colorado landscape and the rich stories of the people who live there.

The 2021 Paonia Film Festival shifted to showcase filmmakers local to the Western Slope of Colorado and filmmakers through the Western United States on a two-tier system. The event was on November 6–7, 2021.

=== Pickin' in the Park ===
The town has live music in the park every Thursday evening during the month of August.

== Notable people ==
- Paolo Bacigalupi — American science fiction and fantasy writer
- Theo Colborn — scientist, founder of The Endocrine Disruption Exchange
- Robert E. Huyser — four-star general in the United States Air Force
- Cassidy Lehrman — American actress
- Thurman "Fum" McGraw — college football All-American and Super Bowl Champion
- Dennis McKenna — ethnopharmacologist, research pharmacognosist
- Terence McKenna — ethnobotanist, lecturer, and author
- John Whooley — musician, member of Estradasphere

== See also ==
- Colorado municipalities
