= Colorado's 7th Senate district =

American legislative district

Colorado's 7th State Senate district
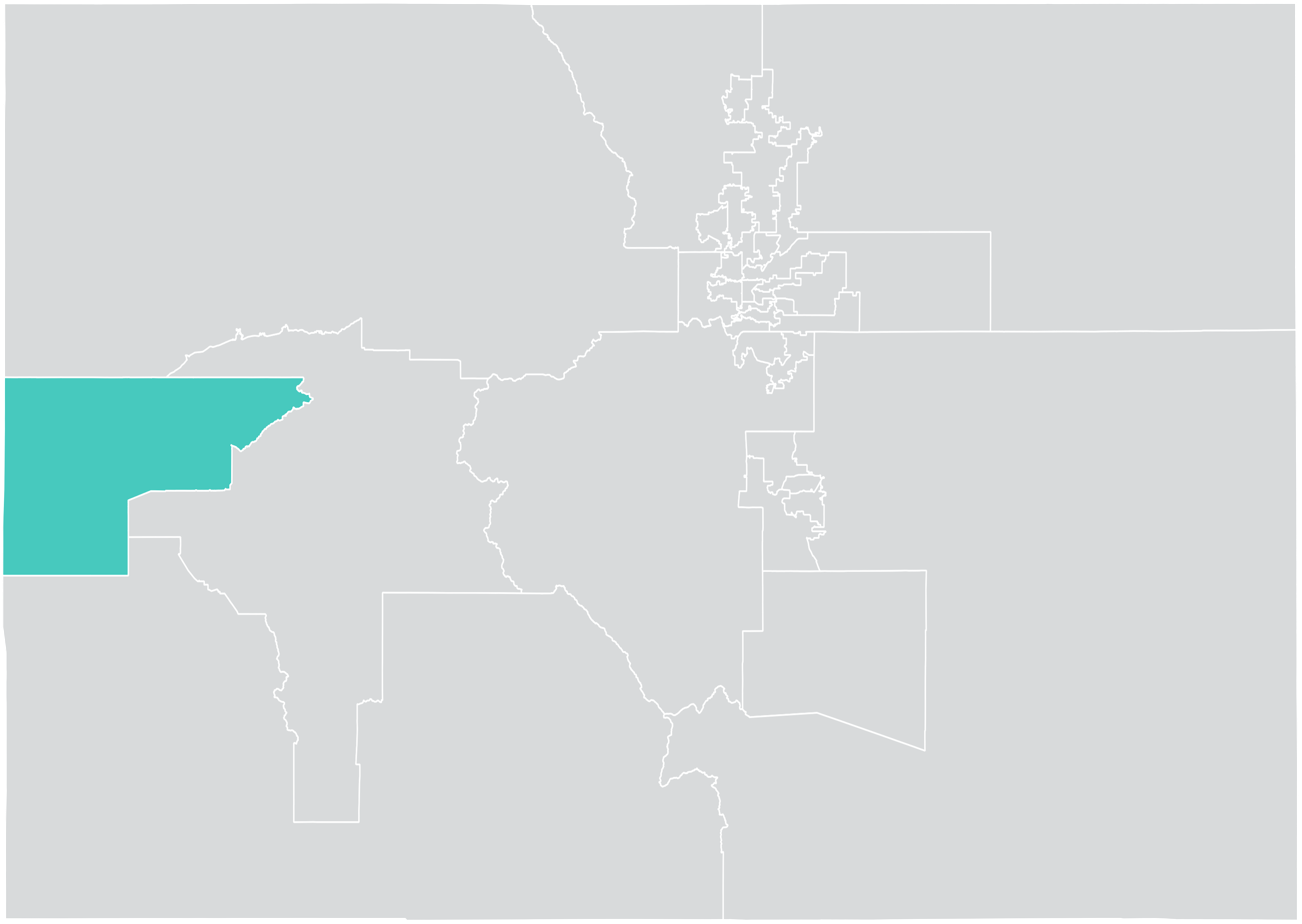
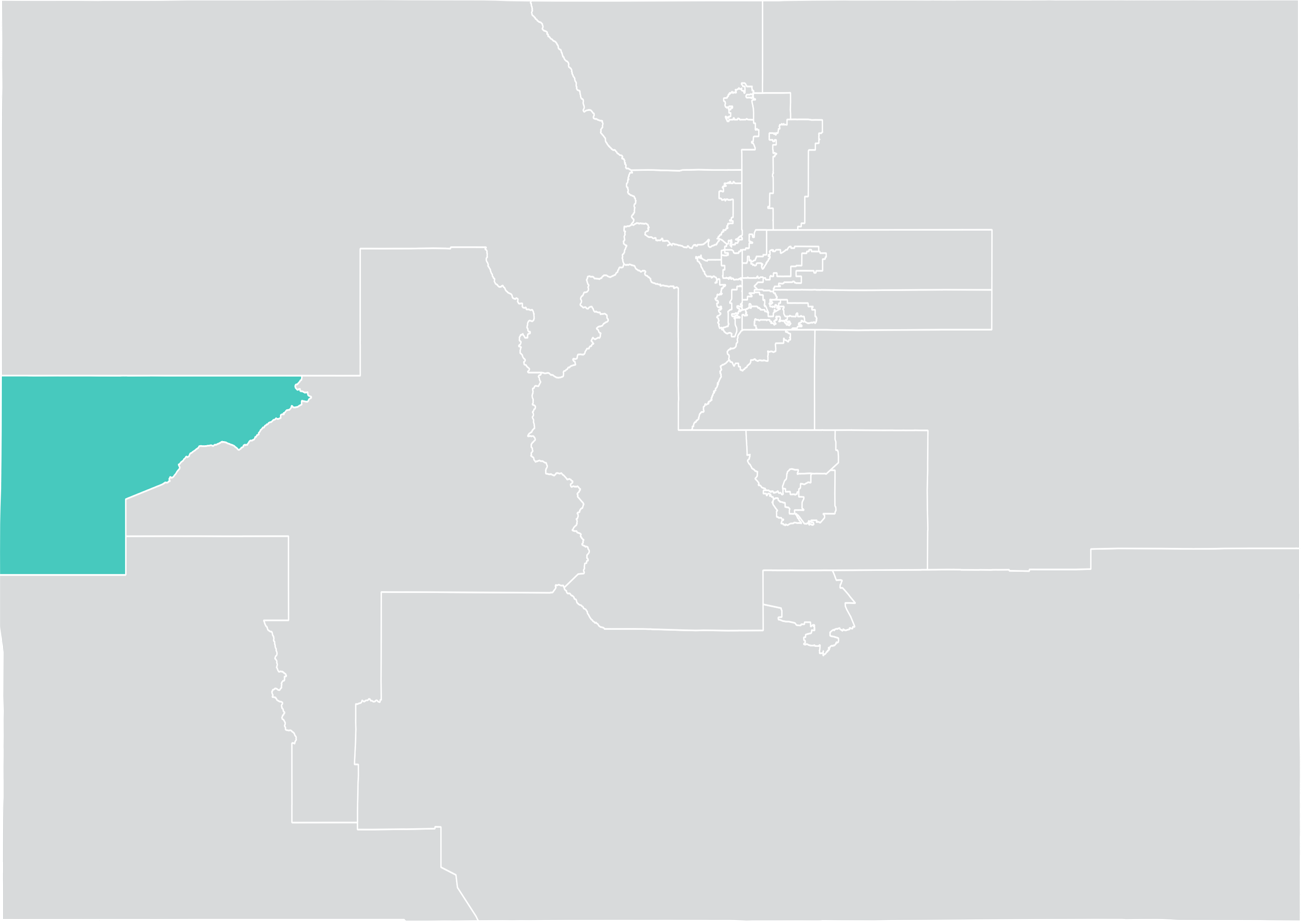
Senator
Janice Rich; R–Grand Junction
- Registration: 36.2% Republican; 13.0% Democratic; 48.3% No party preference
- Demographics: 82% White; 1% Black; 14% Hispanic; 1% Asian; 1% Native American; 2% Other
- Population (2018): 149,998
- Registered voters: 112,501

Colorado's 7th Senate district is one of 35 districts in the Colorado Senate. It has been represented by Republican Janice Rich since 2023. Prior to redistricting the district was represented by Republicans Ray Scott and Steve King.

== Geography ==
District 7 is exactly coterminous with Mesa County, covering Grand Junction and the nearby communities of Fruita, Palisade, Clifton, Fruitvale, Loma, Orchard Mesa, and Redlands.

The district is located entirely within Colorado's 3rd congressional district, and overlaps with the 54th and 55th districts of the Colorado House of Representatives. It borders the state of Utah.

== Recent election results ==
=== 2022 ===
Colorado state senators are elected to staggered four-year terms; under normal circumstances, the 7th district holds elections in midterm years. The 2022 election will be the first held under the state's new district lines.

2022 Colorado State Senate election, District 7
Party	Candidate	Votes	%
Republican	Janice Rich	52,696	70.1
Democratic	David Stahlke	22,520	29.9
Total votes		75,216	100

== Historical election results ==
=== 2018 ===
2018 Colorado State Senate election, District 7
Primary election
Party	Candidate	Votes	%
Republican	Ray Scott (incumbent)	14,361	64.1
Republican	Dan Thurlow	8,054	35.9
Total votes		22,415	100
General election
Republican	Ray Scott (incumbent)	42,327	63.6
Democratic	Chris Kennedy	24,205	36.4
Total votes		66,532	100
Republican hold			

=== 2014 ===
2014 Colorado State Senate election, District 7
Party	Candidate	Votes	%
Republican	Ray Scott	39,580	70.6
Democratic	Claudette Konola	16,506	29.4
Total votes		56,086	100
Republican hold			

=== Federal and statewide results ===
Year	Office	Results
2020	President	Trump 62.7 – 34.8%
2018	Governor	Stapleton 61.0 – 35.3%
2016	President	Trump 64.1 – 28.0%
2014	Senate	Gardner 68.4 – 26.8%
2014	Governor	Beauprez 60.9 – 34.3%
2012	President	Romney 65.1 – 32.7%
