= Janice Rich =

American politician from Colorado

- Senator Rich in 2026

Member of the Colorado Senate from the 7th district
- Incumbent
- Assumed office January 9, 2023
- Preceded by: Ray Scott

Member of the Colorado House of Representatives from the 55th district
- In office January 4, 2019 – January 9, 2023
- Preceded by: Dan Thurlow
- Succeeded by: Rick Taggart

Personal details
- Born: Janice Ann Ward; November 18, 1951 (age 74) Midlothian, Texas
- Party: Republican
- Spouse: Steve Rich
- Profession: County official Legal secretary
- Website: www.janicerichforcolorado.com

Janice Rich is a state senator from Grand Junction, Colorado. A Republican, Rich represents Colorado's 7th Senate district which includes all of Mesa County and a portion of Delta County. Previously, Rich represented Colorado House of Representatives District 55, which included the communities of Clifton, Fruitvale, Grand Junction, Orchard Mesa, and Redlands on Colorado's Western Slope.

== Background ==
Janice Rich was born in Midlothian, Texas.

Rich is a certified professional legal secretary. In 2003, Rich became Mesa County Clerk until 2010. Rich worked for over twenty years as a legal secretary and as a court clerk prior to holding her first elected office. Rich also owned and operated a secretarial and business support service.

Rich and her husband Steve live in Grand Junction, Colorado.

== Political career ==
Rich was first elected to public office in 2003 where she served as the Mesa County Clerk and Recorder for two terms. Rich served as the Mesa County Treasurer from 2010 to 2018.

Rich was elected to represent the 55th House District in the Colorado House of Representatives in 2018. She was reelected to the seat in 2020.

Rich was elected to represent Colorado's 7th Senate district in 2022. Rich currently serves as the Senate Republican Minority Whip.

Currently Rich serves as Senate Minority Whip. She also serves on the Education Committee Legislative Council. Local Government and Housing Committee and Statutory Revision Committee.

== Electoral history ==
2014 Mesa County Treasurer election
Party	Candidate	Votes	%
Republican	Janice Rich	46,876	100.00%
Total votes		46,876	100%
Republican hold			

Rich was first elected as a state representative in the 2018 general elections. In that election, she defeated her Democratic Party opponent, winning 62.64% of the vote.

2018 Colorado House of Representatives election, 55th District
Party	Candidate	Votes	%
Republican	Janice Rich	22,470	62.64%
Democratic	Tanya Travis	13,401	37.36%
Total votes		35,871	100%
Republican hold			

Rich was re-elected in the 2020 general election, defeating two opponents, one from the Democratic Party and one from the Green Party.

2020 Colorado House of Representatives election, 55th District
Party	Candidate	Votes	%
Republican	Janice Rich (incumbent)	30,773	64.07%
Democratic	Scott Beilfuss	15,570	32.42%
Green	Sierra Garcia	1,688	3.51%
Total votes		48,031	100%
Republican hold			

In August 2021, Rich announced her candidacy for a seat in the Colorado Senate. Specifically, she ran to represent the newly reapportioned Senate District 7, which includes all of Mesa County and a portion of Delta County. In the election, Rich defeated her Democratic Party opponent, winning 70.06% of the total votes cast.

2022 Colorado Senate election, 7th District
Party	Candidate	Votes	%
Republican	Janice Rich	52,696	70.06%
Democratic	David Stahlke	22,520	29.94%
Total votes		75,216	100%
Republican hold			
