= Dan Thurlow =

American politician

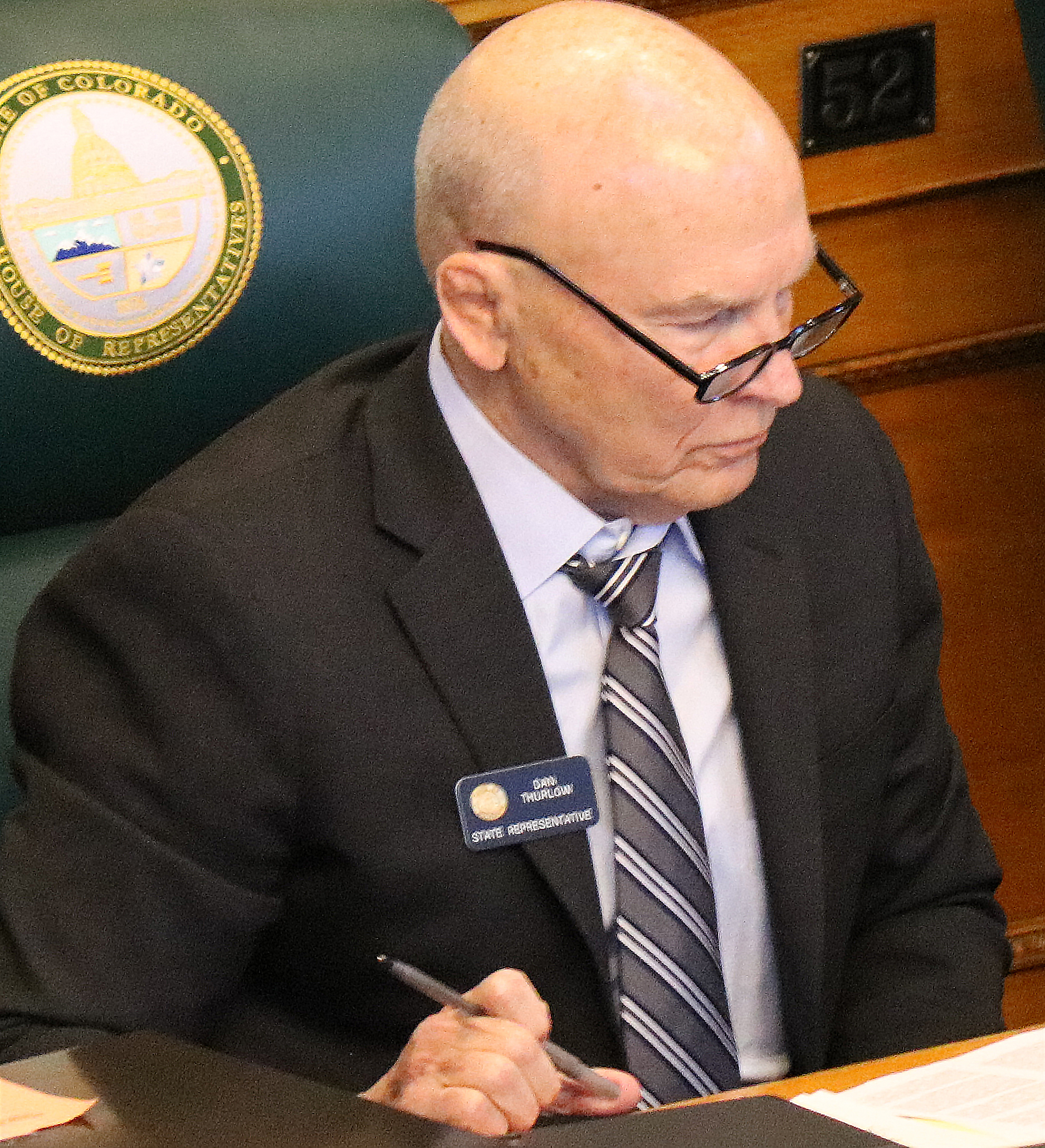
- Thurlow in 2018.

Member of the Colorado House of Representatives from the 55th district
- In office January 7, 2015 – January 4, 2019
- Preceded by: Ray Scott
- Succeeded by: Janice Rich

Personal details
- Party: Republican
- Education: Colorado State University
- Profession: Business Owner
- Website: www.facebook.com/DanThurlow55/

Dan Thurlow (born 1947) is a Colorado politician and former member of the Colorado House of Representatives from the 55th District, which encompassed the Mesa County communities of Clifton, Fruitvale, Grand Junction, Orchard Mesa, and Redlands.

Thurlow, a Republican, is from Grand Junction. Although his legislative website lists his occupation as "Business owner," at least one news report indicates Thurlow sold his business.

== Elections ==
- In 2014, Thurlow won the Republican primary and then went on to defeat his Democratic opponent in the general election, winning 66.5% of the vote.
- In 2016, Thurlow did not face any opposition in the primary or in the general election and was re-elected.
- In 2018, Thurlow ran for State Senate but lost in the primary.
