= Mesa County Public Library District =

Libraries in Colorado, U.S.

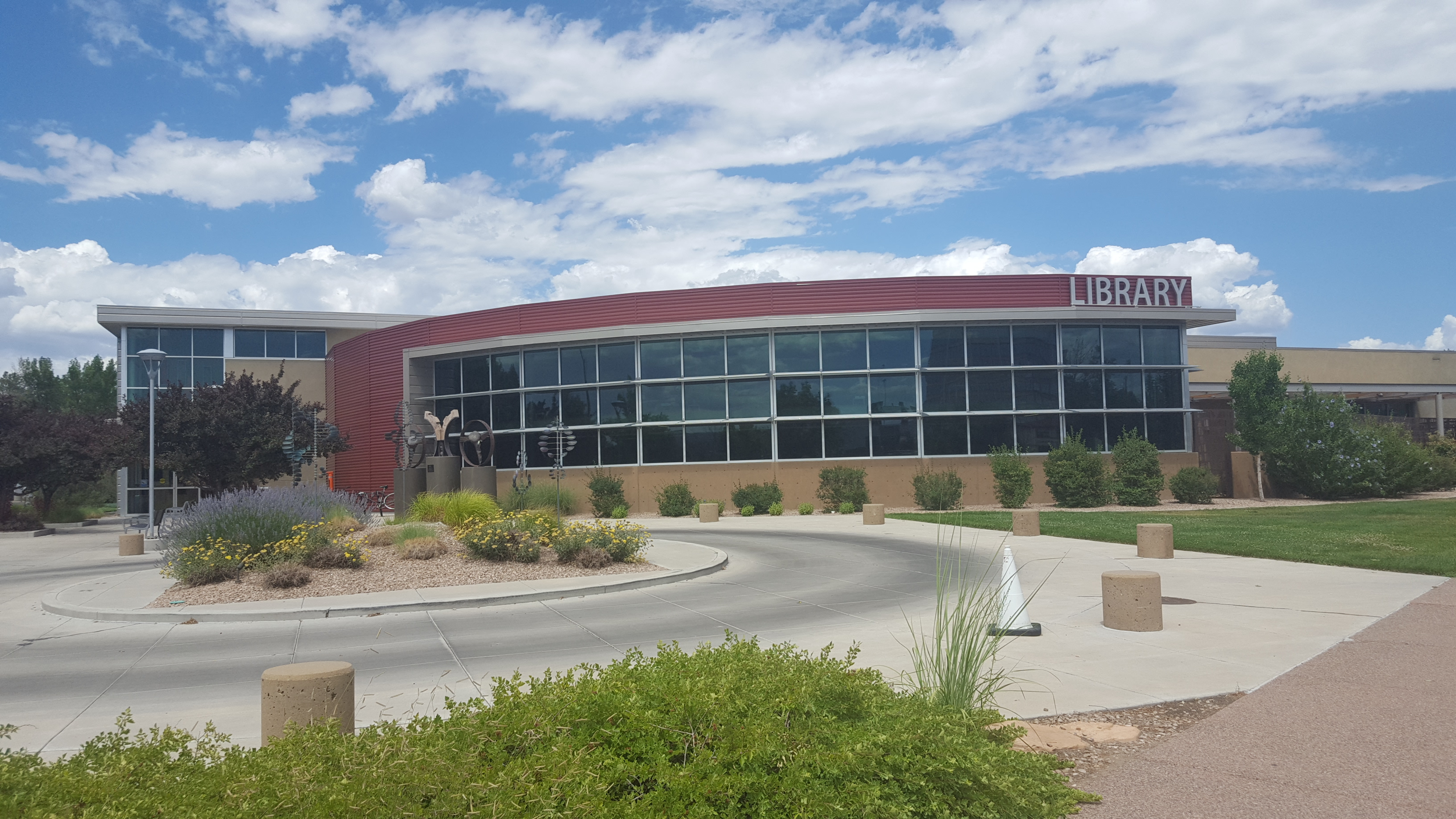
- Central Library in downtown Grand Junction
- 39°04′15″N 108°33′49″W
- Location: Mesa County, Colorado, U.S.
- Type: Public

Other information
- Website: www.mcpld.org

The Mesa County Libraries is based in Mesa County, Colorado. The Central Library is located in Grand Junction, Colorado and the other branches are located in Clifton, Fruita, Orchard Mesa, Palisade, Collbran, De Beque and Gateway.

MCPLD serves about 150,000 people in the county. They offer extensive services and programs for children, teens and adults. The library also offers many services for adult learning as well as many computer-related services including classes, public computers, a digital conversion station, Wi-Fi, Black and white or color copying, scanning and printing.

The Mesa County Libraries also owns and operates the 970West Studio, a digital recording and production studio that offers opportunities for Mesa County residents to learn and create professional-level audio and video recordings.
