= Steve King (Colorado legislator) =

American politician (born 1965)

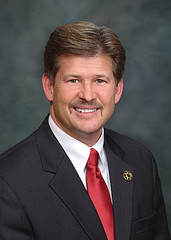

Member of the Colorado Senate from the 7th district
- In office January 2011 – January 7, 2015
- Preceded by: Josh Penry
- Succeeded by: Ray Scott

Member of the Colorado House of Representatives from the 54th district
- In office January 10, 2007 – January 2011
- Preceded by: Josh Penry
- Succeeded by: Ray Scott

Personal details
- Born: December 12, 1965 (age 60)
- Party: Republican
- Education: Mesa State College

Steve King (born December 12, 1965) is an American politician who served in the Colorado House of Representatives as a Republican in 2006 and served until January 2011. King was elected to the Colorado Senate in 2010, and was sworn in January 2011. He represented Senate District 7 which includes Mesa County and part of Garfield County. He did not run for reelection to the State Senate in 2014, so his term ended in January, 2015.

== Biography and early career ==
King graduated from Colon High School in Colon, Michigan in 1977, and then earned an associate's degree from Mesa College in 1980. After graduation, he worked as a police officer for the Grand Junction Police Department, receiving law enforcement officer certification from the Colorado Law Enforcement Training Academy in Golden, Colorado.

King was promoted to detective in 1982, and then transferred back to the patrol division in 1986 while finishing an undergraduate degree. From 1987 to 1988, he worked briefly as an investment broker, and received his bachelor's degree in psychology from Mesa State College in 1988. He returned to the Grand Junction Police Department in 1988 as a field training officer. In 1990, King received the Grand Junction Police Department Medal of Honor for Life Saving. From 1991 to 1993, King served as president of the Grand Junction Police Officer's Association; in 1992, he was vice-president of the City of Grand Junction's Employees Association, and served as its president in 1993.

King began training in martial arts in 1977; he is a second degree black belt in Jeet Kune Do and Shorin-Ryu Karate. He received a gold medal in karate at the 1993 World Police and Fire Games and a silver medal at the 1995 games.

Shortly after marrying in 1991, King, with his wife, Daun, founded American National Protective Services, a company providing self-defense instruction to women and incident management and robbery prevention instruction to businesses. He remains the chief operating officer of the company. In 1999, King joined the Mesa County Sheriff's Office as an investigator for the Complex Crimes Unit. From 2000 through 2006, he served as president of the Mesa County Deputy Sheriff's Association. King still worked part-time with both the Mesa County Sheriff's Office and American National Protective Services during his first term as a legislator.

He and his wife Daun have three children.

== Colorado House of Representatives ==
=== 2006 election ===
In the 2006 general elections, King defeated Democrat Richard Alward with 62 percent of the popular vote.

=== 2007 legislative session ===
During the 2007 legislative session, King served on the House Business Affairs and Labor Committee and the House Judiciary Committee.

In his first legislative session, King introduced a bill, cosponsored by House Speaker Andrew Romanoff and signed into law by Gov. Ritter, to allow rape or domestic violence victims to use false addresses in public records. He was also an outspoken proponent of expanding Colorado's "Make My Day" law to cover businesses, and against legislation which would have ended Colorado's use of the death penalty.

In September 2007, King was appointed by Gov. Bill Ritter to a 21-member task on handling and use of DNA evidence. The task force recommended legislation, co-sponsored by King in the state house, to require that DNA evidence in capital cases be preserved. The bill spurred opposition from a number of district attorneys because of a provision that would require new trials in cases where evidence had been lost by law enforcement. After the bill passed and was signed into law, Grand Junction law enforcement officials expressed concern about the storage capacity required to meet the law's evidence preservation requirements, and approached King for assistance.

In November 2007, King led Republican legislators in a letter to President George W. Bush prohibiting illegal immigrants from being detained at jails using tasers.

=== 2008 legislative session ===
In the 2008 session of the Colorado General Assembly, King sat on the House Judiciary Committee and the House Local Government Committee.

King was a co-chair of a special legislative committee that recommended the censure of Rep. Douglas Bruce for kicking a photographer; King had called for his suspension from the House, and voted to require Bruce to apologize for his actions.

During the 2008 session, King sponsored legislation to give universities (specifically, Mesa State College in his district and Colorado State University) greater control over their own investment funds, to raise bails for DUI charges in which suspects also commit "aggravating offenses", and to prevent child pornography from being copied during legal proceedings. He also sponsored a ballot measure to allow senior citizens to take advantage of property tax credits even after moving. In total, King sponsored 12 House and Senate bills, seven of which were passed into law.

Following the legislative session, King was named to an interim committee focusing on wildfire and development issues in mountain areas of Colorado. In October, King called for a legislative audit on enforcement of a state law prohibiting sanctuary city policies.

In December 2008, King, frustrated with new regulation and with comments made regarding job losses in Colorado's energy industry, called for Gov. Ritter to fire Dave Neslin, the director of the Colorado Oil and Gas Conservation Commission.

=== 2008 election ===
Rep. King sought re-election to the Colorado legislature in 2008; he faced no opposition for the Republican nomination and ran unopposed in the general election as well.

King named education and energy issues as his priorities for the next legislative session. In contrast to his typical opposition to tax increases, King also supported a local school bond measure in Grand Junction that was on the 2008 ballot.

=== 2009 legislative session ===
For the 2009 legislative session, King was appointed to the House Judiciary Committee and the House Transportation and Energy Committee.

In 2009, King continued his active engagement in the legislature by serving as primary sponsor for 13 bills. His major focus included legislation with an emerging focus on increasing government accountability and transparency. In particular, he sponsored two measures: SB09-241 and HB09-1180. SB09-241 (Katie's Law) requires DNA sampling upon arrest for felony offenses, to be expunged if no conviction is obtained, and Rep. King received national recognition when he was awarded the "Katie's Heroes" award for his role in passing this legislation. HB09-1180 would have provided more Second Amendment personal safety options for Colorado concealed carry permit holders, but it was postponed indefinitely in committee.

=== 2010 legislative session ===
In 2010, King presented a bill that would have required all schools, kindergarten–twelfth grade, to perform emergency safety drills each academic year, in addition to the normal fire evacuation drills. The emergency safety protocol drills would include lockdown, evacuation and reverse-evacuation, and shelter in place drills. However, HB10-1136 was assigned to the House Education Committee, where it was postponed indefinitely.

== Colorado Senate 2011-2015 ==
=== 2010 Election ===
In 2010, Rep. King was eligible for re-election to the 54th House seat; however, he instead chose to run for the open Senate seat in District 7. In the general November election, he defeated Democrat Claudette Konola and Libertarian Gilbert Fuller with 67% of the vote.

=== 2011 Legislative Session ===
For the 2011 legislative session, Senator King focused on a bill that would have phased-out the property tax on business personal property. SB11-098 allowed for future enactment, once the state has reached prosperity levels adequate to deal with the decrease of tax income. The bill was assigned to the Senate State, Veterans, and Military Affairs Committee, and it was postponed indefinitely on a party-line 3-2 vote.

King was appointed to serve on the Senate Transportation, Judiciary, and Legislative Audit Committees for the 68th General Assembly.

Senator King was appointed to the Mental Illness in the Criminal Justice System Interim Committee for the 2011 Interim; this committee focused on maintaining legislative oversight into the continuing examination of persons who are mentally ill in the Colorado Justice System. King was appointed to the Police Officers' and Firefighters' Pension Reform Commission and the Senate Transportation Legislation Review Committee for the 2011 Interim as well.

=== 2012 Legislative Session ===
In 2012, King focused on addressing a number of important issues in Colorado: addressing technological changes for the Safe2Tell program, updating penalties for impaired driving, and focusing on correcting gun limitation laws. HB12-1064 would prohibit government and law enforcement from banning possession and use of firearms during a state emergency unless that weapon was being used for a crime. The bill, one of four gun bills proposed during session, passed on a party-line vote in the Republican-controlled House before being sent over to the Democrat-controlled Senate. In the Senate, it was introduced to the Senate State, Veterans, and Military Affairs Committee and failed to be referred to the Committee of the Whole on a 2-3 party-line vote.

King maintained his appointments on two Interim Committees for the 2012 off-session as well: the Police Officers' and Firefighters' Pension Reform Commission and the Senate Transportation Legislation Review Committee.

=== 2013 Legislative Session ===
King was appointed to serve on the Senate Judiciary Committee, Transportation Committee, and the Legislative Audit Committee.

== Run for sheriff, criminal indictment and plea ==
While still serving as Senator, on June 6, 2014, King was accused by Mesa County Sheriff Stan Hilkey of falsifying timecards King had filed in association with his part-time job with the department. At the time, King was running to replace Hilkey as sheriff, and denied all allegations and initially refused to drop from the race. On July 16, King announced he would be withdrawing from the race due to the impending allegations. On January 23, 2015, King pleaded guilty to embezzlement and official misconduct. He was ordered to pay restitution and serve 2 years probation.
