= Ray Scott (politician) =

American politician

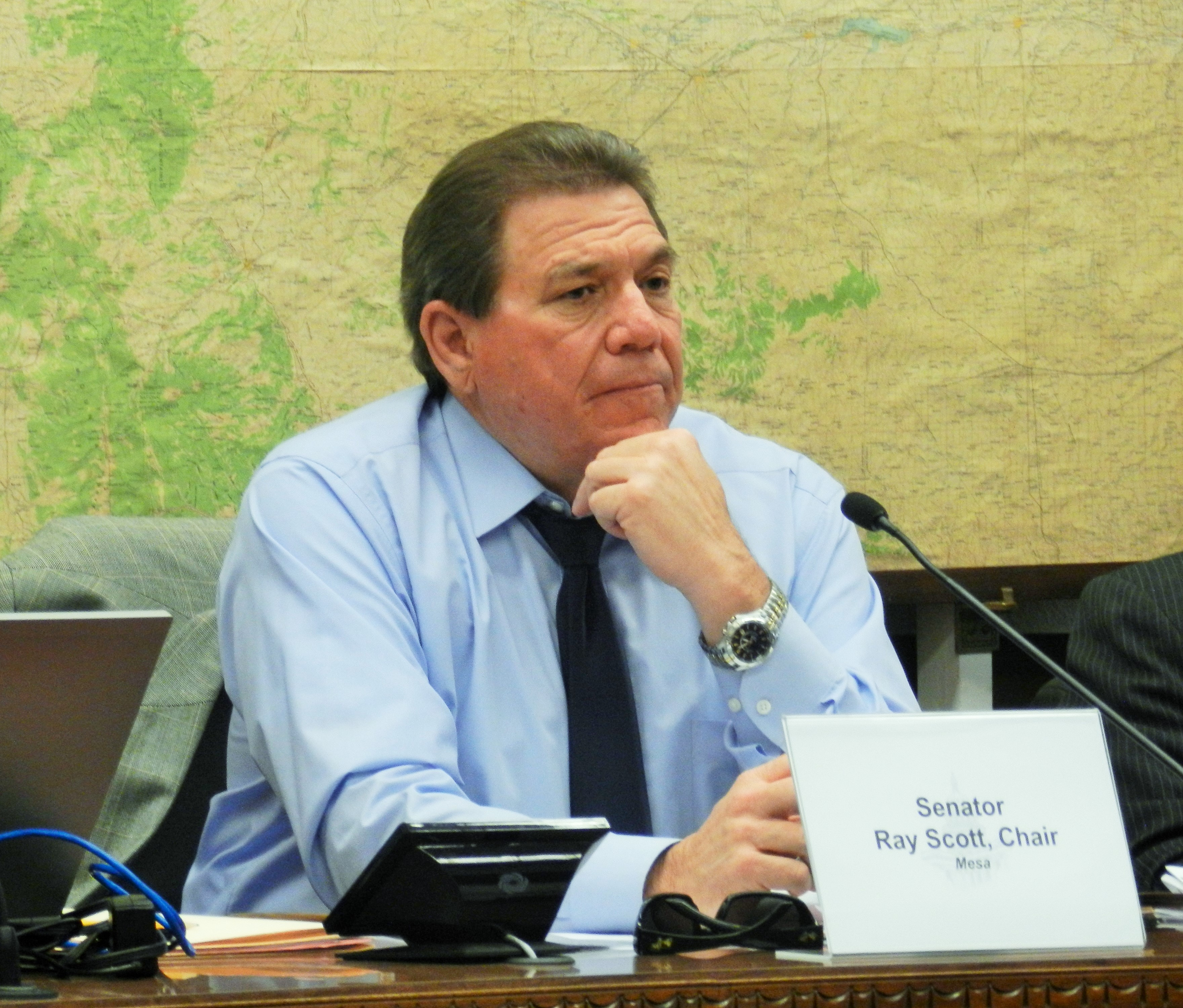

Member of the University of Colorado Board of Regents from the 3rd district
- Incumbent
- Assumed office January 7, 2025
- Preceded by: Glen Gallegos

Member of the Colorado Senate from the 7th district
- In office January 7, 2015 – January 9, 2023
- Preceded by: Steve King
- Succeeded by: Janice Rich

Member of the Colorado House of Representatives from the 55th district
- In office January 9, 2013 – January 7, 2015
- Preceded by: Laura Bradford
- Succeeded by: Dan Thurlow

Member of the Colorado House of Representatives from the 54th district
- In office January 12, 2011 – January 9, 2013
- Preceded by: Steve King
- Succeeded by: Jared Wright

Personal details
- Born: April 23, 1953 (age 73) Youngstown, Ohio, U.S.
- Party: Republican
- Education: Colorado Mesa University (BA)
- Website: Campaign website

Ray Scott (born 1956/1957 in Youngstown, Ohio) is an American politician. He served as a Republican member of the Colorado State Senate, representing District 7 from January 7, 2015 to January 9, 2023. Previously, Scott served consecutively from January 12, 2011 until January 9, 2013 in the Colorado House of Representatives representing District 54, and from January 9, 2013 to January 7, 2015 representing District 55. In 2024 Scott was elected to represent Colorado's 3rd congressional district on the University of Colorado Board of Regents.

== Elections ==
- 2014 Ran for the Colorado State Senate District 7 seat, against Democratic opponent Claudette Konola, and won the race 71% (37,874) to 29% (15,721) of votes cast. The Senate District 7 seat was previously vacated by Steve King who sought elected office in the Mesa County Sheriff's Department. Colorado's 7th Senate District encompasses Mesa County and a portion of Garfield County.
- 2012 Redistricted to District 55, and with incumbent Republican Representative Laura Bradford leaving the Legislature, Scott ran unopposed for the June 26, 2012 Republican Primary, winning with 6,330 votes, and won the three-way November 6, 2012 General election with 22,056 votes (58.2%) against Democratic nominee Dan Robinson and Libertarian candidate Virgil Fenn.
- 2010 When District 54 Republican Representative Steve King ran for Colorado Senate, Scott won the August 10, 2010 Republican Primary with 6,352 votes (55.5%), and was unopposed for the November 2, 2010 General election, winning with 26,176 votes.

== "Fake news" incident ==
After the Grand Junction Daily Sentinel published a column urging him to advance a bill granting journalists greater access to public records, Scott referred to the article and the newspaper as "fake news" on social media. The newspaper's publisher reacted by threatening to sue.

== Ray Scott social media blocking case ==
On May 13, 2019, the American Civil Liberties Union of Colorado filed a lawsuit in Federal District Court against Colorado State Senator Ray Scott on behalf of his constituent Anne Landman for blocking her from his official Facebook and Twitter pages. Landman had been able to interact with Scott and others in these spaces until June 2017, until after she wrote an article critical of Senator Scott’s position on climate change and posted it on his official Facebook page. In response, Scott blocked Landman from his official Facebook page and Twitter account. Scott refused many requests from Landman to “unblock” and “unban” her, and even ignored an ethics complaint that Landman and two other blocked constituents had filed with the Colorado State Senate in August 2017. Landman alleged in her ACLU complaint that Scott had violated her First Amendment rights by blocking and banning her from the interactive portions of his official government Facebook page and Twitter account. The complaint cited ten previous legal cases that had been resolved in her favor by that point.

Scott settled the social media blocking case on September 10, 2019 for $25,000, using taxpayer funds to pay Ms. Landman's legal fees. The legal fees Senator Scott's government-funded attorneys charged were not disclosed. The settlement required Scott agree "to refrain from 'blocking' or 'banning' any individuals or organizations, including Ms. Landman and organizations with which she is affiliated," and "refrain from deleting or hiding any comments posted" on his official Facebook page and Twitter account. It was noted in the agreement that Facebook's own software contributed to the lawsuit since using mobile devices to unblock was unsuccessful. The agreement applied "to any official Facebook page and official Twitter account Senator Scott might establish in the future as a government official, even if he is, at that time, holding a different position within the government, whether state, federal, or local, regardless of whether that position is obtained by election, appointment, or employment."

The Grand Junction, Colorado Daily Sentinel published an editorial about the case on September 11, 2019 titled "The Price of Obstinance" which stated, "It's hard to believe that it took state Sen. Ray Scott this long to appreciate — or even understand — how he was trampling on the First Amendment, especially given the number of editorials we've written condemning his practice of blocking critics on social media accounts in which he self-identifies as an elected government official...The right thing to do would have been to take corrective action immediately, unblock constituents and apologize for violating the Constitution. Instead, Scott waited to get sued, leaving taxpayers on the hook for the ACLU's attorneys fees — again, despite our warning that he was playing with fire..."
