= KRYD =

KRYD may refer to:

- KRYD (FM), a radio station (104.9 FM) licensed to Norwood, Colorado, United States
- KRYD-LP, a defunct low-power television station (channel 10) formerly licensed to Vail, Colorado, United States
