= Laura Bradford =

American politician (born 1957)

Member of the Colorado House of Representatives from the 55th district
- In office January 7, 2009 – January 9, 2013
- Preceded by: Bernie Buescher
- Succeeded by: Ray Scott

Personal details
- Born: January 9, 1957 (age 69) Crookston, Minnesota
- Party: Republican
- Profession: Businesswoman

Laura Bradford (born January 9, 1957) was a legislator in the U.S. state of Colorado. Elected to the Colorado House of Representatives as a Republican in 2008, Bradford represented House District 55, which encompasses northern portions of Mesa County and northern Grand Junction from 2008 to 2013.

== Biography ==
=== Early life and career ===
Born in Crookston, Minnesota and raised in Stephen, after moving to Montana and working at Yellowstone National Park at the age of 18, Bradford settled in Colorado, living in Denver, Greeley, and Aspen, before moving to Grand Junction, Colorado in 1981. Bradford has been married three times; she and her husband, Linton Mathews, have three children: Elizabeth, Meredith, and Preston.

After founding several sewing-related businesses, Bradford founded ProSafe Products in 1987, a small business manufacturing fitted covers and garments for medical and dental applications. Her family opened a tree farm in 2006 on land near Collbran, Colorado. She joined the Women's Success Forum at the University of Denver Daniels College of Business in 1998, and was featured in the 1999 book Women Who Mean Business. She was a member of the Colorado Women's Economic Development Council from 1995 to 2000, and, in 1999, was appointed its chair by Gov. Bill Owens, and also sat on the Mesa County Revolving Loan Fund Administration Loan Review Committee.

An amateur musician, Bradford has been treasurer for the Messiah Choral Society and directed her church's English Handbell Choir. She has served in various positions with the Republican party, and became House District 55 chair in 2002.

== Legislative career ==
=== 2008 election ===
Bradford began considering a run for the house seat, meeting with Republican leaders, in 2007, as did former state senator Ron Teck. When Teck declined to run in August 2008, Bradford was left as the leading contender for the seat. She had no opposition in the August 2008 Republican primary, but faced incumbent Democratic Rep. Bernie Buescher in the November 2008 general election. Buescher was widely expected to become the next Speaker of the House if re-elected. Buescher's candidacy was endorsed by the Denver Post.

Bradford ran a campaign focused on fiscal and economic issues, particularly attempting to link Buescher with Gov. Bill Ritter and their support of a controversial mill levy freeze. Buescher was targeted by flyers from Focus on the Family Action and other 527 groups during the campaign. Bradford was also criticized by outside groups as failing to support cancer screenings, a charge she rebutted by citing her own bout with cancer. Bradford aired television commercials responding to attacks from 527 groups, some of which were briefly taken off the air and revised after it was discovered that a photograph of Buescher, taken by a Grand Junction Daily Sentinel reporter and used in the ad, was used without proper permission.

Bradford, running in a district with a 2:1 Republican voter registration advantage, received a late-minute boost from a visit by Republican presidential candidate John McCain on election day. As returns came in, Bradford and Buescher traded leads, with Bradford leading at the end of the night. By the following day, Bradford's lead settled at about 600 votes, more than 1 percent of ballots cast. Buescher conceded defeat the day after the election.

After defeating Buescher, Bradford received a standing ovation when first meeting with the House Republican caucus later in the week.

=== 2009 legislative session ===
For the 2009 legislative session, Bradford was named to seats on the House Business Affairs and Labor Committee and the House Local Government Committee, where she was the ranking Republican member.

The first bill introduced by Bradford was a measure to update laws governing Colorado's statewide voter registration database into compliance with federal regulations. Bradford has announced her intention to support an expansion of the personal property tax exemption, a bill her opponent Buescher had promoted, and has publicly supported efforts to pass a version of Jessica's Law in Colorado, mandating stricter sentencing for sex offenders, and is expected to introduce a version of the legislation with Reps. Frank McNulty and Scott Tipton.

=== Drunk driving ===
On January 25, 2012, Bradford was pulled over by Denver police after making an illegal turn. After the officer smelled alcohol on her breath, Bradford admitted to police that she had been drinking. Upon administering roadside sobriety tests, the officer called a supervisor to receive advice. Denver Police later claimed that Bradford then invoked Article V Section 16, of the Colorado Constitution, which provides for legislative immunity:

The members of the general assembly shall, in all cases except treason or felony, be privileged from arrest during their attendance at the sessions of their respective houses, or any committees thereof, and in going to and returning from the same; and for any speech or debate in either house, or any committees thereof, they shall not be questioned in any other place.

The representative, however, claims she never invoked legislative immunity; a claim which was substantiated by a House ethics committee. Bradford was issued a traffic ticket and her vehicle was impounded by Denver Police. Bradford later told a journalist that she drank three and a half glasses of wine during the night in question. She later delivered an apology on the House floor.

=== 2012 election ===
Bradford did not stand for reelection in 2012 and was succeeded by Republican politician Ray Scott who won election with 58% of the vote.
