= Jared Wright =

American politician

Member of the Colorado House of Representatives from the 54th district
- In office January 9, 2013 – January 7, 2015
- Preceded by: Ray Scott
- Succeeded by: Yeulin Willett

Personal details
- Party: Republican
- Profession: Police officer politician editorial cartoonist newspaper editor
- Website: www.jaredwright.com

Jared Wright is an American newspaper editor, editorial cartoonist, and former Colorado politician. He has also worked as a police officer. Wright served a single term in the Colorado House of Representatives from 2013 to 2015, representing House District 54 in Mesa and Delta counties.

After leaving office, he was appointed editor and publisher of the Denver-based political newspaper The Colorado Statesman, for which he had earlier been contributing political cartoons. Wright is from Fruita, Colorado and worked as a police officer there.
