= KNOZ =

Simulcasts KRYD, Norwood, CO
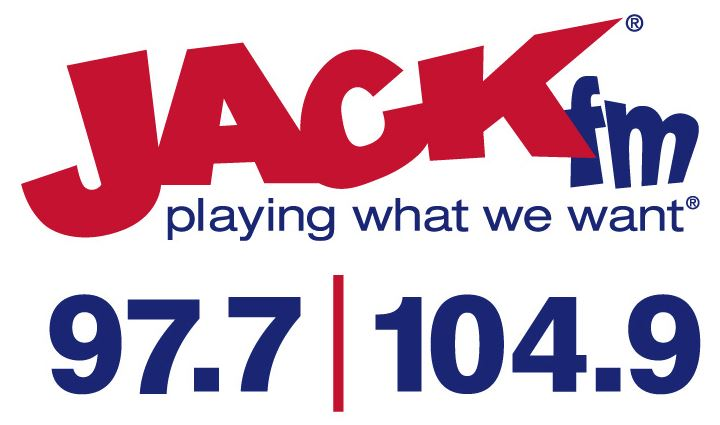
- Orchard Mesa, Colorado; United States
- Broadcast area: Grand Junction, Colorado
- Frequency: 97.7 MHz
- Branding: 97.7 & 104.9 Jack FM

Programming
- Format: Adult hits

Ownership
- Owner: Paul Varecha

History
- First air date: 2012

Technical information
- Licensing authority: FCC
- Facility ID: 189537
- Class: C2
- ERP: 5,000 watts
- HAAT: 446.1 meters (1,464 ft)
- Transmitter coordinates: 39°4′0″N 108°44′55″W

Links
- Public license information: Public file; LMS
- Webcast: Listen live
- Website: jackfmcolorado.com

KNOZ (97.7 FM) is a radio station licensed to Orchard Mesa, Colorado, United States, broadcasting an adult hits format. KNOZ serves the Grand Junction, Colorado, area and is owned by Paul Varecha. KNOZ is a full simulcast of KRYD 104.9 Norwood, CO, running the Jack FM adult hits satellite format. Prior to July 2014, KNOZ aired an all news format.

Former logo
