= Josh Penry =

American politician & operative (born 1976)

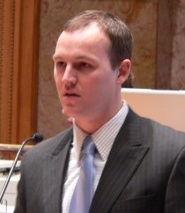
- Penry in 2007

Member of the Colorado Senate from the 7th district
- In office January 2, 2007 – January 2011
- Preceded by: Ron Teck
- Succeeded by: Steve King

Member of the Colorado House of Representatives from the 54th district
- In office January 2005 – January 2007
- Preceded by: Matt Smith
- Succeeded by: Steve King

Personal details
- Born: February 1, 1976 (age 50) Denver, Colorado, US
- Party: Republican
- Education: Colorado Mesa University

Josh Penry (born February 1, 1976) is the former minority leader of the Colorado Senate. Elected in 2006, Penry was the youngest member of the Colorado state Senate. According to The Denver Post, Penry played a leadership role in opposing regulation for the oil and gas industry and a labor bill. Penry was identified by several newspapers as a "rising star" in Colorado politics during the 2000s. Prior to serving in the state Senate, Penry served in the state House of Representatives for one term.

Penry was born in Colorado and a long-time resident of Western Colorado. Penry graduated from Grand Junction High School and Mesa State College, where he quarterbacked the Mesa State Mavericks football team and served as student body President. In 1998, Penry was named the National Scholar Athlete of the Year by the American Football Coaches Association and the Burger King Corporation, an award given to Peyton Manning the previous year. Penry graduated summa cum laude from Mesa State in 1998.

== Work as an aide ==
Penry moved to Washington, D.C. to work for Congressman Scott McInnis. First as an aide and then as Press Secretary, Penry helped McInnis formulate and negotiate natural resources legislation. Penry was appointed staff director of the House Resources Subcommittee on Forests and Forest Health, where he played a lead role in negotiation the Healthy Forests Restoration Act with the White House and Republicans and Democrats on Capitol Hill.

== State House ==
After returning to Grand Junction, Penry was elected to the state House in 2004. In his first term, Penry sponsored and won passage for the "Colorado Water for the 21st Century Act", legislation designed to minimize water-resource fights. Penry's bill, signed into law in June 2005, created roundtables for each river basin to assess and address regional water needs.

In 2008, Penry was part of a bi-partisan effort involving Gov. Bill Ritter, Rep. Frank McNulty, and the Colorado Public Employees Retirement Association (PERA) Board to divest public pension funds from companies with ties to Iran. Penry also sponsored legislation to strengthen Colorado's education standards to better equip students to compete in a highly competitive global economic environment, and he initiated and negotiated a bi-partisan bill to invest growing federal mineral lease revenues into Colorado's colleges and universities. Penry was a principal supporter of 2008's Amendment 52, which would have directed mineral severance tax revenue away from water conservation projects to road building, but which failed at the polls.

Penry has been at the center of numerous policy debates, including road and bridge funding initiatives, efforts to pass Jessica's Law and other penalties against sexual predators, the debate about natural gas drilling in Colorado, and a range of tax, fiscal and budget issues. While working closely on education issues with Colorado's Democratic Governor Bill Ritter, Penry has been a frequent critic of the Ritter Administration's tax, budget, jobs and union policies.

== Personal life ==
Penry is married to Kristin Strohm, a principal at the Starboard Group, a political firm in Colorado. Penry is the father of four children: Chase, Emme, Sophie, and Caroline.
