= Highline Lake State Park =

State park in Mesa County, Colorado

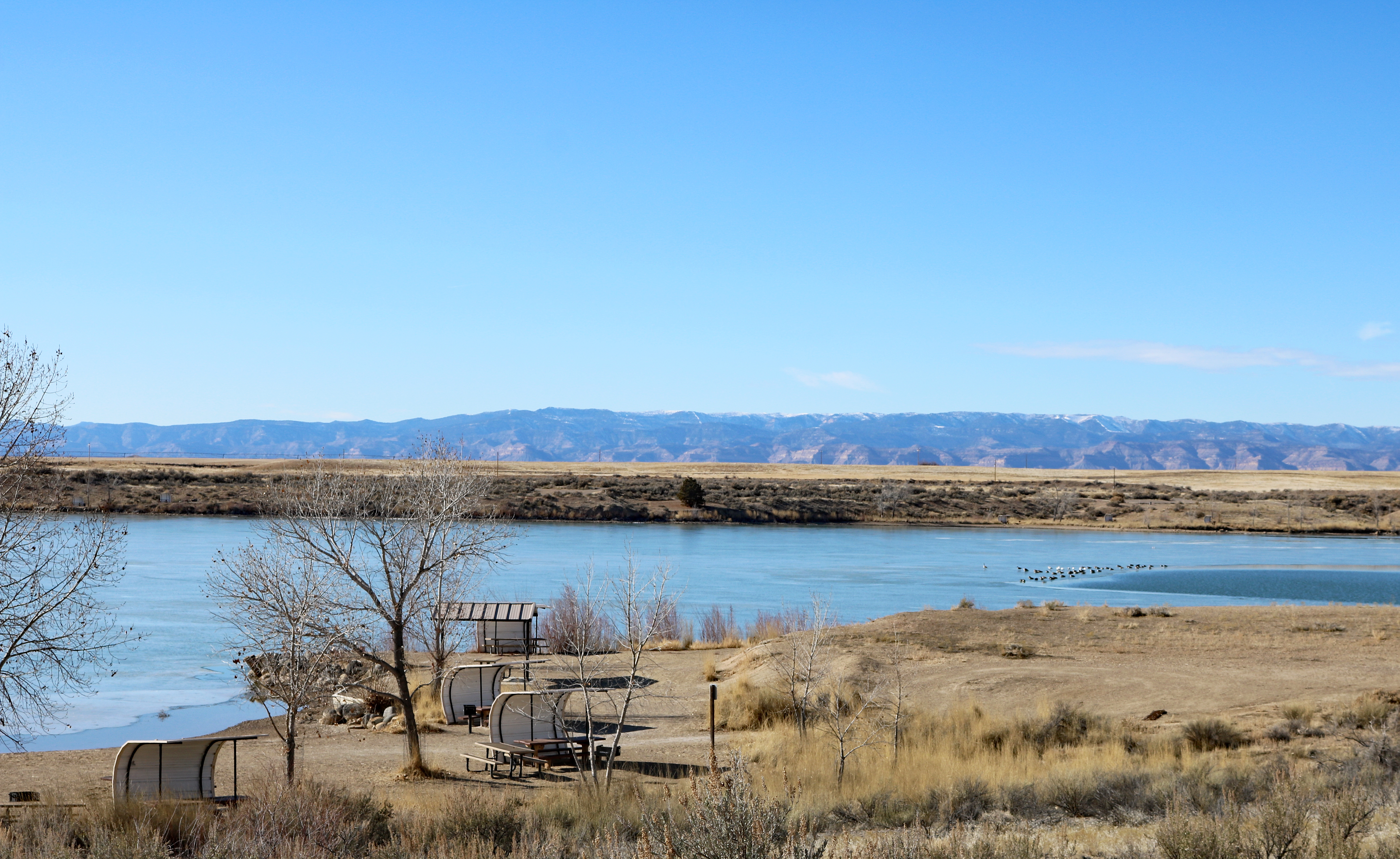
- Highline Lake in 2020

- Location within Colorado
- Location: Mesa County, Colorado, U.S.
- Nearest city: Grand Junction, Colorado
- Coordinates: 39°16′13″N 108°50′14″W
- Area: 563 acres (2.28 km^{2})
- Established: 1967
- Visitors: 230,036 (in 2021)
- Governing body: Colorado Parks and Wildlife

Highline Lake State Park is a Colorado state park. It is home to two lakes, Highline Lake, elevation 4,702 feet (1,433 m) and Mack Mesa Lake, elevation 4,728 feet (1,441 m). It is well known for its birdwatching opportunities and has two wildlife migratory waterfowl overlook kiosks where it is possible to watch great blue heron, white pelicans, and whooping crane, among many others. There is fishing allowed all year round. It is also open in winter to snowshoers and cross country skiers.

== Zebra mussel infestation ==
Colorado Parks and Wildlife (CPW) first detected zebra mussels in Highline Lake in September 2022. Further testing the following month found an established population of the mussels in the lake, leading CPW to classify the lake as infested. This zebra mussel infestation is the first in Colorado.
