= KRYD (FM) =

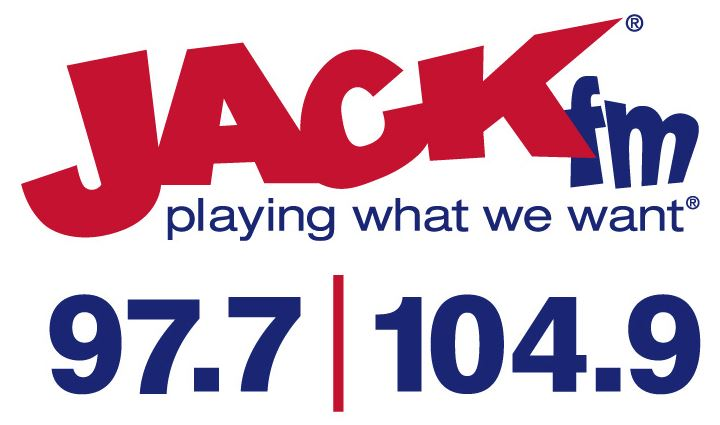
- Norwood, Colorado; United States
- Broadcast area: Montrose, Colorado; Grand Junction, Colorado
- Frequency: 104.9 MHz
- Branding: 97.7 & 104.9 Jack FM

Programming
- Format: Adult hits

Ownership
- Owner: Rocky III Investments

History
- First air date: January 1998

Technical information
- Licensing authority: FCC
- Facility ID: 57324
- Class: C1
- ERP: 24,000 watts
- HAAT: 511.6 meters (1,678 ft)
- Transmitter coordinates: 38°18′59″N 108°11′55″W
- Repeater: 97.7 KNOZ (Orchard Mesa)

Links
- Public license information: Public file; LMS
- Webcast: Listen live
- Website: jackfmcolorado.com

KRYD (104.9 FM, "97.7 & 104.9 Jack FM") is a radio station broadcasting an adult hits format in the Grand Junction, Colorado market. Licensed to Norwood, Colorado, United States, the station is currently owned by Rocky III Investments d/b/a Sunshine Broadcasting, Inc. KRYD is also simulcast on 97.7 KNOZ in Orchard Mesa, Colorado.
