= Colorado Mesa University Tech =

Division of Colorado Mesa University

Coordinates: 39°05′51″N 108°35′14″W

- Former names: Bishop Unified Technical Education Campus (Before 2006); Western Colorado Community College (2006–2023)
- Motto: Success Starts With Heart
- Type: Public community college
- Established: 1925
- Parent institution: Colorado Mesa University
- Academic affiliations: Higher Learning Commission
- President: John Marshall
- Students: 1,473 (fall 2024)
- Location: Grand Junction, Colorado, United States
- Campus: Urban
- Website: http://coloradomesa.edu/

Colorado Mesa University Tech (CMU Tech, formerly known as Western Colorado Community College) is a division of Colorado Mesa University in Grand Junction, Colorado specializing in vocational studies. Students take core curriculum courses at CMU's main campus, but complete their program of study at CMU Tech. Associate degrees from CMU Tech are awarded by Colorado Mesa University.

CMU Tech's main campus, known as the Bishop Campus, is located in northwestern Grand Junction. Its other locations include the Electrical Lineworker Training Facility in eastern Grand Junction and the Colorado Law Enforcement Training Center in the community of Whitewater, just south of Grand Junction. In addition, CMU Tech offers non-credit courses open to the public at the Clifton Community Campus.

CMU Tech offers 31 programs, including professional certificates and associates degrees. Notable programs include the Western Colorado Peace Officers Academy (WCPOA), the Electric Lineworker program, and the Viticulture & Enology program, the latter of which is the only such program in Colorado.

== Facts ==
- The official name of the grounds where CMU Tech is located is now known as the Bishop Campus.
- CMU Tech is composed of six buildings—Archuleta Center, Chinle Hall, Dakota Hall, Kayenta Hall, Unaweep Hall, and Youngblood Hall—all located entirely on the Bishop Campus. CMU Tech's South Campus, located about five miles away, houses the Electrical Lineworker program.

== History ==
- Prior to 2006, the institution was called the Tilman M. Bishop Unified Technical Education Campus or UTEC.
- In 2023, it was announced that the institution would again change its name from the former Western Colorado Community College to the current name.

== Campus ==
CMU Tech houses six buildings, which include classrooms, laboratories, and administrative offices:

- Archuleta Center
- Chinle Hall
- Dakota Hall
- Kayenta Hall
- Unaweep Hall
- Youngblood Hall

=== Other Locations ===
Aside from its main campus, CMU Tech operates two other academic facilities:

- Colorado Law Enforcement Training Center, located at 3340 Whitewater Hill Road in the community of Whitewater, 10 miles south of Grand Junction
- Electric Lineworker Training Center, located at 4441 29 Road in southeastern Grand Junction
