= Colorado Mesa University =

Public university in Grand Junction, Colorado, US

- Former names: List: Grand Junction Junior College (1925–1932); Grand Junction State Junior College (1932–1937); Mesa County Junior College (1937–1940); Mesa College (1940–1988); Mesa State College (1988–2011)
- Motto: "Empowering the Mind Through Heart"
- Type: Public university
- Established: April 10, 1925; 101 years ago
- Academic affiliations: Space-grant
- Endowment: $70 million (2025)
- President: John Marshall
- Faculty: 597
- Students: 9,788 (fall 2025)
- Undergraduates: 9,459 (fall 2025)
- Postgraduates: 329 (fall 2025)
- Location: Grand Junction, Colorado, US; 39°04′50″N 108°33′16″W
- Campus: Urban, 141 acres (57 ha)
- Newspaper: The Criterion
- Other campuses: Montrose; Clifton
- Colors: Maroon, white & gold
- Nickname: Mavericks
- Sporting affiliations: NCAA Division II – Rocky Mountain
- Website: coloradomesa.edu

Colorado Mesa University (CMU or Mesa) is a public university in Grand Junction, Colorado, United States. Originally established in 1925 as Grand Junction Junior College, the school was renamed to Mesa College in 1940. The college began offering bachelor's degrees in 1974, and in 1988, changed its name to Mesa State College to reflect its growing educational programs. In 2011, the school officially attained university status and adopted its current name.

CMU's main campus sits on 141 acres (57 ha) in central Grand Junction. CMU's branch campuses include CMU Tech in northwestern Grand Junction and a CMU regional campus in Montrose, about 60 miles (97 km) southeast of Grand Junction. The university offers over 100 undergraduate programs and 11 postgraduate programs across 14 academic departments. Colorado Mesa University enrolled 9,788 students in fall 2025, making it the largest university in western Colorado, as well as the largest university in the state outside of the Front Range Urban Corridor.

Colorado Mesa's athletic teams, known as the Mavericks, compete at the NCAA Division II level as members of the Rocky Mountain Athletic Conference. The Mavericks have won 70 RMAC regular season titles across the school's 26 NCAA sports.

== History ==
=== Grand Junction Junior College (1925–1937) ===
Mesa County, Colorado, was officially founded in 1883; by the 1920 United States Census, the county's population had more than quintupled to over 22,000 residents, with the city of Grand Junction alone having more than 9,000 residents. As the population of the area continued to rise, the need for education facilities became apparent. Many students in the region had to travel long distances for college; the majority of the state's higher education institutions were along the Front Range Urban Corridor, well over 200 miles from Grand Junction. Even the closest institution, Western State College of Colorado (now known as Western Colorado University), was located in Gunnison, over 120 miles to the southeast. To meet the growing demand for education, in 1925, Colorado Governor Clarence Morley signed Senate Bill 262 into law, which established Grand Junction Junior College. GJJC welcomed its inaugural class of 39 students the same year. At the time of its founding, the college offered seven courses, with tuition at $8 per class.

=== Mesa College (1937–1988) ===
After brief stints being known as Grand Junction State Junior College, Mesa County Junior College, and Mesa Junior College, the school was renamed to Mesa College in 1940. By this time, enrollment had increased to nearly 300 students. The school's selection of community college programs continued to increase as well, with enrollment surpassing 1,000 students in 1961, and a vocational school being added in 1967. In 1962, Rangely College was opened in the town of Rangely as an extension of Mesa College, with the goal of expanding higher education access to Colorado's northwest corner. Rangely College became an independent institution in 1970, and in 1974, adopted its current name of Colorado Northwestern Community College.

In 1972, Governor John Arthur Love signed Senate Bill 16 authorizing Mesa College to begin offering bachelor's degrees, effective fall 1974. Due to this expansion of programs, by 1979, enrollment had increased to 3,891 students, having nearly tripled within 15 years.

=== Mesa State College (1988–2011) ===
In 1988, the school was renamed Mesa State College as it began transitioning from a junior college into a four-year state college. In 1994, the Colorado legislature authorized Mesa State College to begin offering select graduate programs, as the need for higher education in western Colorado began to increase. In 1996, Mesa State began offering its first graduate program, a Master of Business Administration (MBA) program. With the addition of this program, Mesa State College became the only four-year institution in Colorado to offer a full range of undergraduate degrees (technical certificates, associate degrees, and bachelor's degrees) along with graduate programs.

Prior to 2003, all four of Colorado's state colleges (Adams State College, Mesa State College, Metropolitan State College of Denver, and Western State College of Colorado) were governed under a single governing board, the Consortium of State Colleges in Colorado. However, in 2003, the CSCC was abolished; each school was granted its own governing board, and the Colorado General Assembly assigned Mesa State to be the designated higher education provider for 14 counties in western Colorado: Delta, Eagle, Garfield, Grand, Jackson, Mesa, Moffat, Montrose, Ouray, Pitkin, Rio Blanco, Routt, San Miguel, and Summit counties. In 2005, the school officially opened Western Colorado Community College (now known as CMU Tech), which would serve as the school's two-year, open admission division.

=== Colorado Mesa University (2011–Present) ===
In 2011, Mesa State College officially attained university status and its name was changed to Colorado Mesa University. During the name change process, strong contenders for the school's new moniker were "Mesa State University" and "Grand Mesa University", but the college's then-Executive Director of Marketing and Recruitment Rick Taggart felt that the new name should include "Colorado". An effort was also made to rename North Avenue–the principal street on which the university is located and a major street in Grand Junction–to "University Boulevard"; this effort was ultimately unsuccessful.

Colorado Mesa University was officially established as a university under Colorado state law in 2012, with its role and mission to be a regional education provider of bachelor's and master's degrees, as well as associate degrees and technical certificates.

== Campus ==
=== Asteria Theatre ===
Completed in 2024, the 860-seat Asteria Theatre serves as the newest venue for CMU's performing arts departments, as well as a venue for public speakers, debates, and other notable events. The theatre features the largest stage in western Colorado, and was built with help from a $39 million grant from the Colorado General Assembly, the largest state grant ever received by CMU. The theatre has played host to several notable speakers and performers, including astronomer Neil deGrasse Tyson, singer Kalani Pe'a, and Colorado Governor Jared Polis.

=== Confluence Hall ===
Built in 2018, the 68,700 square feet (6,380 m^{2}) Confluence Hall on the west end of campus is home to CMU's Department of Computer Science & Engineering. The hall also houses the EUREKA! McConnell Science Museum, a non-profit museum which features many interactive exhibits.

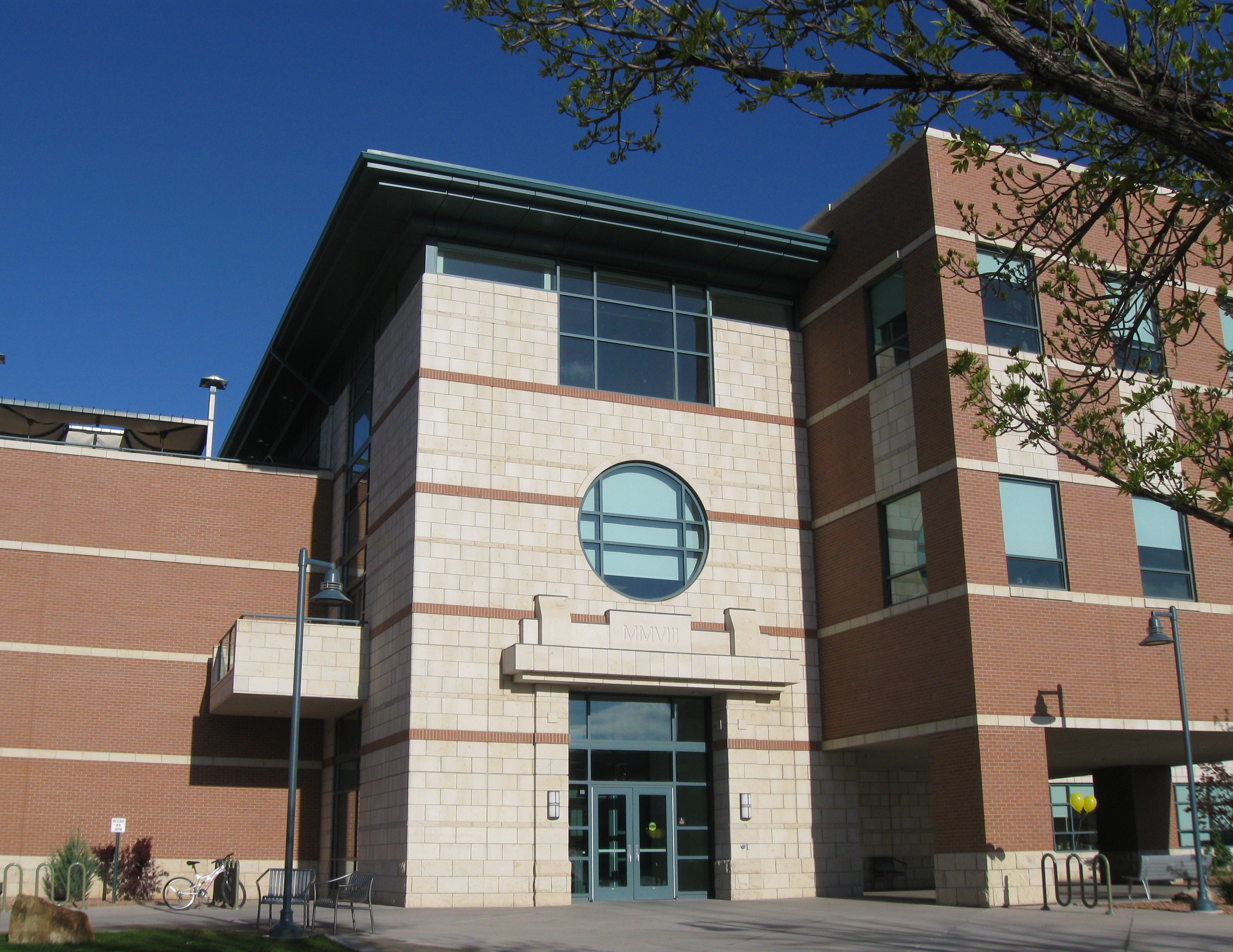
Dominguez Hall

=== Dominguez Hall ===
Dominguez Hall was built in 2011 and is home to the Davis School of Business and the Center for Teacher Education. This building has several classrooms, including four large semi-circle lecture rooms, computer labs, small study rooms, study open spaces (indoors and outdoors), faculty offices, a coffee shop, and a boardroom. Dominguez Hall is named after the Dominguez Canyon Wilderness located southeast of Grand Junction.

=== Escalante Hall ===
The three-story, 76,000 square feet (7,100 m^{2}) Escalante Hall houses CMU's Department of Languages, Literature & Mass Communication. Built in 2014, Escalante Hall notably features a third-floor foyer with attached outdoor terraces, which provide panoramic views of the campus and broader Grand Valley. The hall takes its name from the Escalante Canyon, located in the Dominguez–Escalante National Conservation Area southeast of Grand Junction.

=== Forensic Investigation Research Station ===
Known by the acronym "FIRS", this facility consisting of a laboratory building and a fenced-in body farm is located just south of Grand Junction, near the community of Whitewater. As of January 2018, the decomposition of 11 bodies was under investigation with a focus on identification of microbial clocks, collections of microorganisms that appear and change in a predictable manner during the course of human body decomposition.

=== Health Sciences Building ===
Formerly the home of Community Hospital, the Health Sciences Building is now home to the Department of Health Sciences and the Moss School of Nursing, featuring classrooms, laboratory space, and a simulation center for students studying in health-related fields. The building also houses CMU's chapter of Sigma Theta Tau, an international nursing honor society.

=== Houston Hall ===
Houston Hall has the reputation of being the first building on campus. Built in 1940, it is named for the college's first president, Dr. Clifford G. Houston. Before its construction, the college had occupied an abandoned school building (the old Lowell School) in the city's downtown area. During the 2011 expansion and renovation project, delicate care was taken to match the new wing's ornamental brick facade with that of the original building. Houston Hall houses the university's Department of Social & Behavioral Sciences, as well as many general education classes.

=== Kephart Fine Arts Building ===
Built in 2002, the hall was renamed the Kephart Fine Arts Building in 2021 in honor of Jac Kephart, a local artist and alumnus of Mesa State College. This building houses CMU's Department of Art & Design, and comes complete with art studios, covered outdoor areas for kilns, and a bronze foundry. The hall also features a television studio, which is used by the Mass Communication program, and is home to KRMJ-TV, Grand Junction's affiliate of Rocky Mountain PBS.

=== Lowell Heiny Hall ===
Originally built in 1967 to house the college library, previously located in Houston Hall, Lowell Heiny Hall now houses University Authorities offices, Registrar's Office, President's Office, HR, Marketing, and faculty offices.

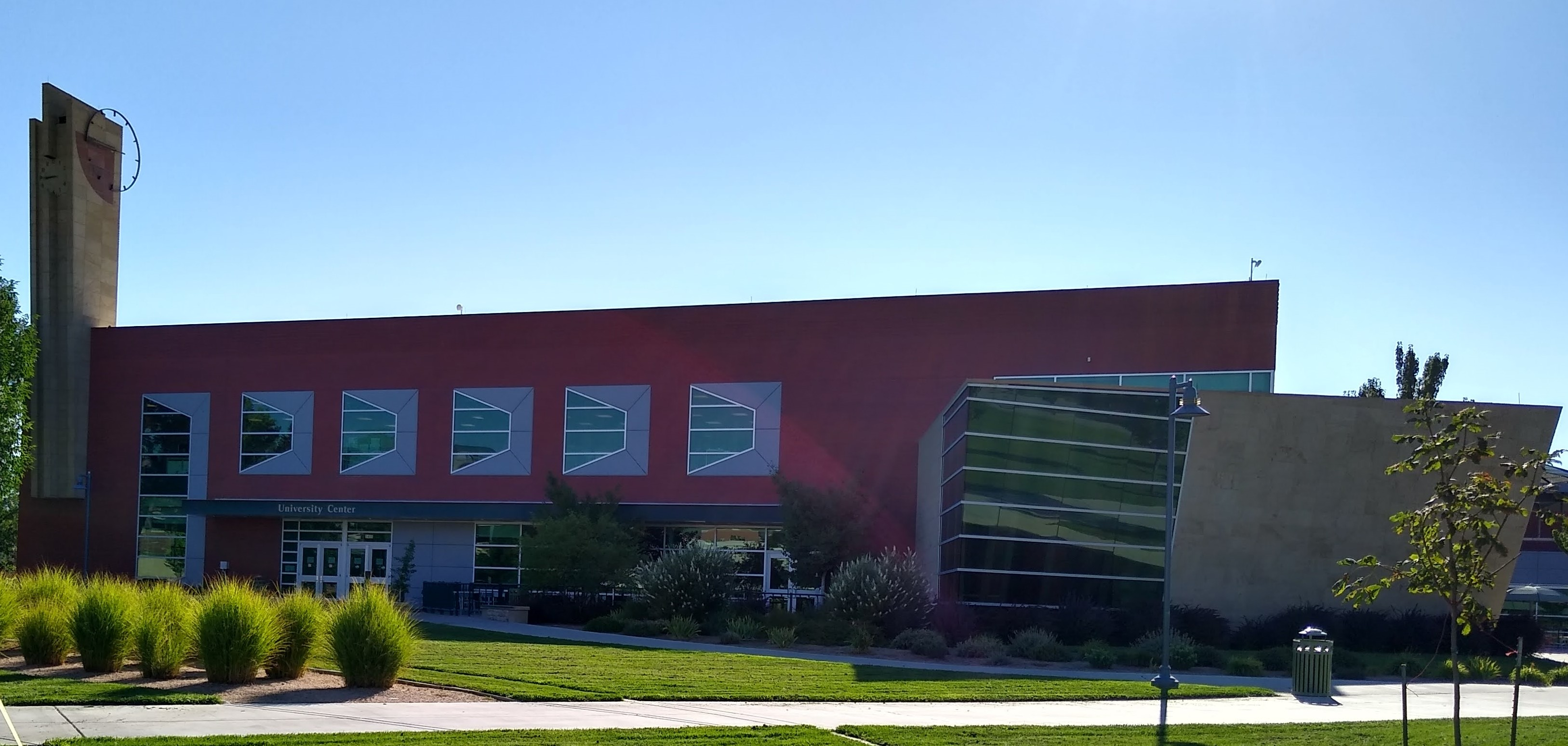
University Center

=== Maverick Center and Foster Field House ===
Formerly known as Saunders Field House, the Maverick Center houses all athletic facilities in one building, except for football and baseball. Additionally, this center houses CMU's Department of Kinesiology. Facilities include the Brownson Arena, El Pomar Natatorium, Hamilton Recreation Center, and Monfort Family Human Performance Lab. Adjacent to the Maverick Center are the Community Hospital Unity field soccer and lacrosse stadium, Elliot Tennis Complex, Bergman Softball Field, and the Maverick Pavilion.

The Foster Field House is home to a climbing wall, a cycling training room, an athletic training lab used by the Department of Kinesiology, and several different athletic courts.

=== Moss Performing Arts Center ===
The Moss Performing Arts Center is the home to the Department of Theatre Arts and the Department of Music. The center features the Love Recital Hall, the Sanders Dance Studio, the Boelter Combs Rehearsal Hall, and the Mesa Experimental Theatre, as well as classrooms and faculty offices. Also located here is the Robinson Theater, a 588-seat performing arts venue named for William S. Robinson, the founder of CMU's theatre program.

=== St. Mary's Medical Education Center ===
Completed in 2022 and built through a partnership between Colorado Mesa University and the City of Grand Junction, Community Hospital, and St. Mary's Regional Hospital, this 24,202 square feet (2,248.4 m^{2}) center houses CMU's Physician Assistant, Physical Therapy, and Occupational Therapy graduate programs. St. Mary's Regional Hospital donated $3 million for the center's development, the largest donation in CMU's history.

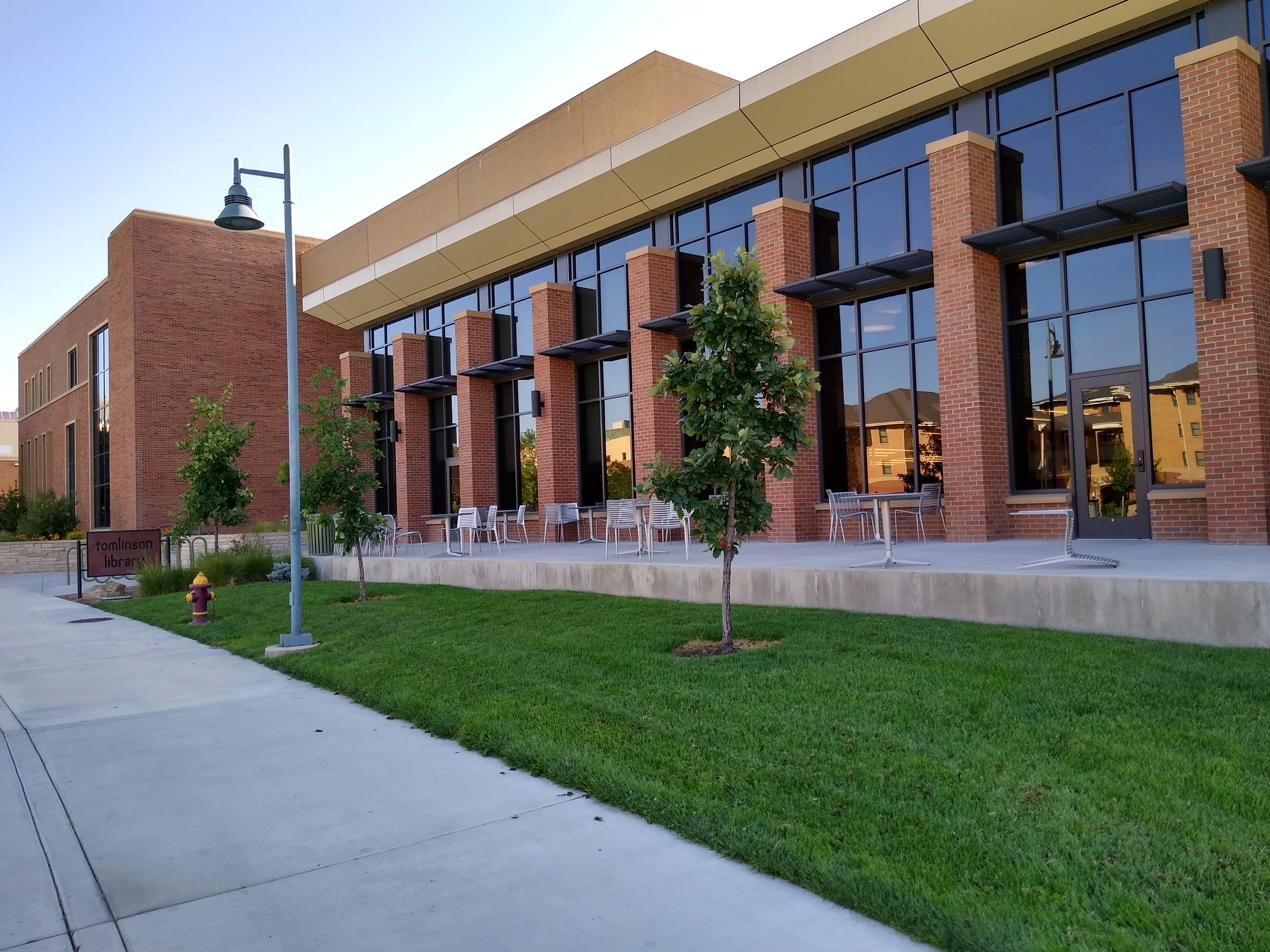
Tomlinson Library

=== Student Wellness Center ===
Operated in partnership with Community Hospital, CMU's Student Wellness Center offers basic medical resources, as well as mental and behavioral health resources, to all CMU students. The center also houses an ambulance bay and a substation of the Grand Junction Police Department dedicated to providing emergency services on campus. Adjacent to the Student Wellness Center is the Stampede Practice Field, used by CMU's marching band for formation practice and storage.

=== Tomlinson Library ===
Named for CMU's 7th President, the John U. Tomlinson Library is home to over 200,000 books and nearly 20 million total items across its physical and online databases. The three-story Tomlinson Library also features study spaces, classrooms, CMU's IT help desk, and common areas. In addition, the building houses an Einstein Bros Bagels and a Qdoba, along with What the MAV!, a campus-operated restaurant.

=== University Center ===
The University Center was built in 2010 to replace the aging W.W. Campbell College Center. It houses the main campus dining facilities, including the on-campus Dining Hall (known as "The Caf"), the Flattop Grill, Starbucks Coffee, Chick-Fil-A, and a small convenience store. The center also houses the Maverick Store (a combination merchandise shop and bookstore), Associated Student Government, The Criterion campus newspaper, KMSA 91.3FM, Ballroom, student lounges, MAV Card Office, and the Student Life office, which contains some club offices.

=== Wubben Hall & Science Center ===
Constructed in 1962, Wubben Hall houses the university's various math and science programs, including the Department of Biological Sciences, the Department of Physical & Environmental Sciences, and the Department of Mathematics & Statistics. In 2010, the three-story, 31,900 square feet (2,960 m^{2}) science center was added to the hall to make room for more classrooms and research spaces. The hall is named for Dr. Horace J. Wubben, CMU's second president.

=== Geothermal energy ===
CMU is one of the first schools to utilize geothermal energy throughout its campus. The project, known as CMU Geo-Grid, was well established by 2024.

As of 2024, CMU Geo-Grid is connected to 16 of the campus's buildings. The university is planning to connect the geothermal system to nine additional buildings. The latest expansion is expected due to the passage of Colorado General Assembly bill SB23-250, sponsored by Barbara Kirkmeyer, Kyle Mullica, Marc Catlin, and Shannon Bird, which secured $6 million for further implementation of CMU's geothermal exchange system. The bill was signed into law by Governor Jared Polis on April 28, 2023.

In 2021, Western Governors Association launched the Heat Beneath our Feet initiative at CMU's Campus. The initiative's purpose is to "examine opportunities for and barriers to the increased deployment of geothermal energy technologies for both electricity generation and heating and cooling systems in western states, which contain the vast majority of high-yield geothermal energy capacity in the U.S."

== Organization and administration ==
The university is governed by a board of trustees, which has 13 trustees (11 voting and two non-voting). The voting members are appointed by Colorado's governor, confirmed by the Colorado State Senate, and serve staggered terms. The student trustee is elected by the student body. The Senatus Academicus names a member from its ranks to serve as the eleventh member.

=== Presidents ===
Colorado Mesa University has had 11 presidents throughout its history, dating back to its beginnings as a junior college. Prior to 1937, the chief executive officer of the school was granted the title of dean rather than president.

1. L.L. Hydle (1925–1928)
2. O.N. Marsh (1928–1932)
3. Clifford G. Houston (1932–1937) (first official president)
4. Horace J. Wubben (1937–1963)
5. William A. Medesy (1963–1970)
6. Theodore E. Albers (1970–1974)
7. Carl R. Wahlberg Jr. (1974–1975)
8. John U. Tomlinson (1975–1989)
9. Raymond N. Kieft (1989–1996)
10. Michael C. Gallagher (1996–2002)
11. Samuel B. Gingerich (2003–2004)
12. Timothy E. Foster (2004–2021)
13. John R. Marshall (2021–present)

== Academics ==
Colorado Mesa University offers programs leading to awards in five levels: technical certificates, associate degrees, baccalaureate degrees, master's degrees and professional doctoral degrees. The university is accredited by the Higher Learning Commission. CMU offers 150 academic programs, including 44 technical certificates, 44 associate degrees, 51 bachelor's degree programs, 9 master's degree programs, and 2 doctoral degree programs. The programs are organized into 11 academic departments, 2 schools, and 1 academic center:

As of 2023, half the student body were first-generation college students.

=== Undergraduate admissions ===
In 2026, Colorado Mesa University accepted 81.4% of undergraduate applicants with those enrolled having an average 3.28 high school GPA. The university does not require submission of standardized test scores, but they will be considered as part of an application if submitted. Those enrolled who submitted test scores had an average 1060 SAT score (49% submitting scores) or an average 22 ACT score (10% submitting scores).

=== Engineering Partnership Program ===
CMU maintains an Engineering Partnership Program with the University of Colorado Boulder; this program allows students pursuing degrees in Civil Engineering, Electrical & Computer Engineering, or Mechanical Engineering to complete the first two years of coursework with CMU faculty. The final two years are taught by CU Boulder faculty, all on CMU's campus in Grand Junction. Upon completion, students earn a CU Boulder degree in their chosen engineering discipline.

=== Rankings ===
Academic rankings

Regional
- U.S. News & World Report: 14 of 97 (West)

In 2026, U.S. News & World Report ranked Colorado Mesa University 14 out of 97 "Regional Universities West", 4 in Top Public Schools out of 18 Public "Regional Universities West", tied for 570 out of 686 universities in Best Bachelor of Science in Nursing (BSN) Programs, and 29 in Top Performers on Social Mobility out of 37 "Regional Universities West".

== Student life ==
Undergraduate demographics as of Fall 2023
Race and ethnicity	Total
White	65%
Hispanic	21%
Two or more races	4%
Unknown	4%
Black	2%
American Indian/Alaska Native	1%
Asian	1%
International student	1%
Economic diversity
Low-income (Note: The percentage of students who received an income-based federal Pell grant intended for low-income students.)	32%
Affluent (Note: The percentage of students who are a part of the American middle class at the bare minimum.)	68%

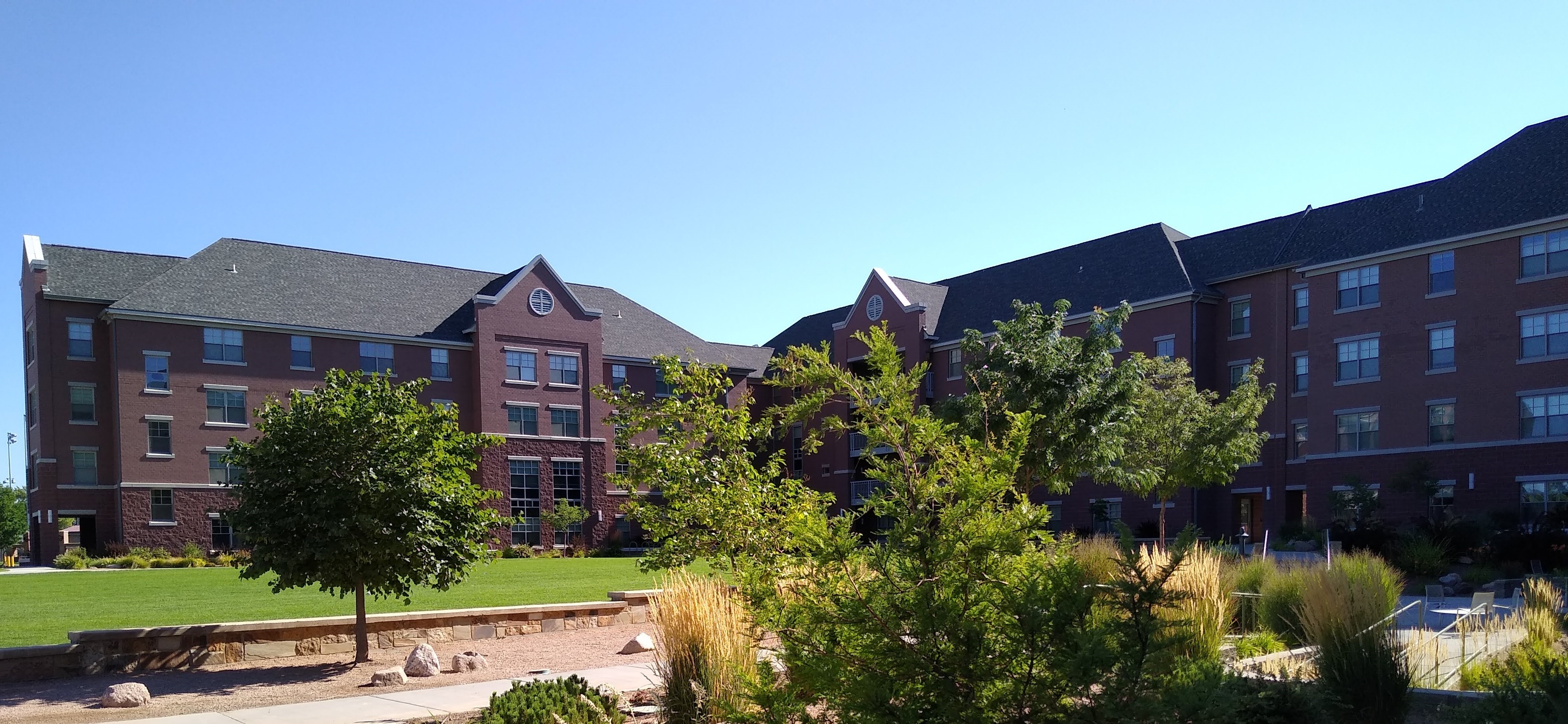
Garfield Hall

In the fall 2024 semester, CMU accepted its largest incoming class in school history, welcoming 2,391 new students to campus.

Colorado Mesa University offers options for students to live on campus. Over 2,000 students live on campus in 13 residential buildings, consisting of traditional rooms, suites and pods, and apartments. Residence halls and apartments are governed by Colorado Mesa University Residence Life, known on campus as ResLife. The Residence Hall Council (RHC) is a student-led extension of ResLife and acts as the governing body for each residence hall. The RHC of each building is composed of an elected executive board and a ResLife representative.

=== Compost program ===
CMU's Compost Facility is student-run organization providing education, training, and selling compost to the public. The program takes university generated food waste and converts it nutrient-rich soil additive, thus reducing the university's overall waste product. The compost facility is run by CMU's Sustainability Council.

=== Residence halls ===
CMU offers 12 on-campus residence halls, serving over 2,000 residential students. Residence halls offer dorm, apartment, and suite-style living.

- Aspen Apartments
- Bunting Hall
- Garfield Hall
- Grand Mesa Hall
- Jay Tolman Hall
- Lucero Hall
- Mary Rait Hall
- Monument Hall
- Orchard Avenue Apartments
- Piñon Hall
- Walnut Ridge Apartments
- Wingate Hall

=== Student media ===
- KMSA 91.3 FM
- The Criterion, student newspaper
- CMU-TV, student-run television station
- Horizon, student-run magazine

=== Greek life ===
CMU's Greek life presence is overseen by the Office of Student Life. The university features three fraternities and two sororities:

- Kappa Sigma
- Theta Xi
- Delta Sigma Phi
- Alpha Sigma Alpha
- Gamma Phi Beta

=== 2025 Campus Unity Event ===
In March 2025, a student organization known as the Western Culture Club hosted a speech by author and political commentator Jared Taylor. Taylor often speaks and writes on issues such as race relations, voluntary racial segregation, and anti-white racism; his views have often been described as far-right and white supremacist in nature. The university's decision to allow the speech was met with both support and criticism. Supporters noted the university's commitment to upholding freedom of speech; in a letter to students regarding the event, CMU President John Marshall affirmed his opposition to Taylor's views, but wrote,

"CMU's role isn't to dictate to student clubs, or to faculty, who they can invite and what content they present ... Our task is to empower you to pursue truth, create space for civil disagreement whereby we can all continue to refine our understanding of the world and follow our conscience.”

Critics, meanwhile, disagreed with the university hosting a speaker known for espousing extremist and hateful views, and argued that allowing Taylor's speech created a hostile environment for students of color. In response to the speech, students organized a "Campus Unity Party", which included protests against the speech along with food trucks, live music, and on-campus events. Over 3,000 students, faculty, and community members attended the Unity Party, making it one of the largest student-led events in Colorado history.

== Athletics ==
CMU's athletic teams are known as the Mavericks; their mascot is symbolized by a rearing bull's head with flaring nostrils. Their official colors are maroon, white, and gold. Student body fans are known as the Herd.

The Colorado Mesa Mavericks have 28 varsity teams that compete in NCAA Division II athletics, as part of the Rocky Mountain Athletic Conference (RMAC). CMU fields teams in men's football, men's baseball, men and women's basketball, women's volleyball, men and women's cross country, men and women's indoor and outdoor track and field, men and women's golf, men and women's soccer, men and women's cycling, men and women's lacrosse, women's softball, men and women's swimming, men and women's tennis, and men and women's wrestling.

CMU has competed at the NCAA Division II level since 1992. Before this, they competed in the National Association of Intercollegiate Athletics (NAIA) from 1976 to 1992 (at which point the entire Rocky Mountain Athletic Conference left the NAIA to join the NCAA's Division II ranks). Prior to becoming a four-year institution in 1974, the Mavericks competed in the National Junior College Athletic Association (NJCAA).

In 2019, CMU was offered the opportunity to ascend to NCAA Division I athletics and join the Western Athletic Conference (WAC). However, the university ultimately turned down the offer, citing the expenses which would be required to make the jump, including a $1.7 million Division I application fee and a $100,000 penalty for leaving the RMAC, in addition to increased salaries for coaches and athletic staff. The open Division I spot was ultimately given to fellow RMAC member Utah Tech University, located in St. George, Utah.

== Notable alumni ==
- Darrel Akerfelds, former professional baseball player
- Duane Banks, former professional baseball player and college baseball coach
- Olivia Cummins, professional/Olympic cyclist
- Pam DeCosta, former college basketball coach
- Brendan Donnelly, former professional baseball player
- Marilyn Ferguson, author
- Don Holmes, college football coach
- Kelley Johnson, beauty pageant titleholder
- Kyle Leahy, professional baseball player
- Barry Lersch, former professional baseball player
- Jeff Linder, college basketball coach
- Marsha Looper, politician
- Bligh Madris, professional baseball player
- Tony Martin, former professional football player
- John Pagano, professional football coach
- Kalani Pe'a, singer-songwriter
- Josh Penry, politician
- Cody Ransom, former professional baseball player
- Sergio Romo, former professional baseball player
- Matt Soper, politician
- Ben Steele, professional football coach
- Michael Strobl, U.S. Marine and subject of the movie Taking Chance
- Dalton Tanonaka, journalist and television executive
- Phil Vigil, college football coach
- Mike Wilpolt, professional football player and coach
