= Redlands, Colorado =

Census-designated place in Mesa County, CO, USA

- Census-designated place
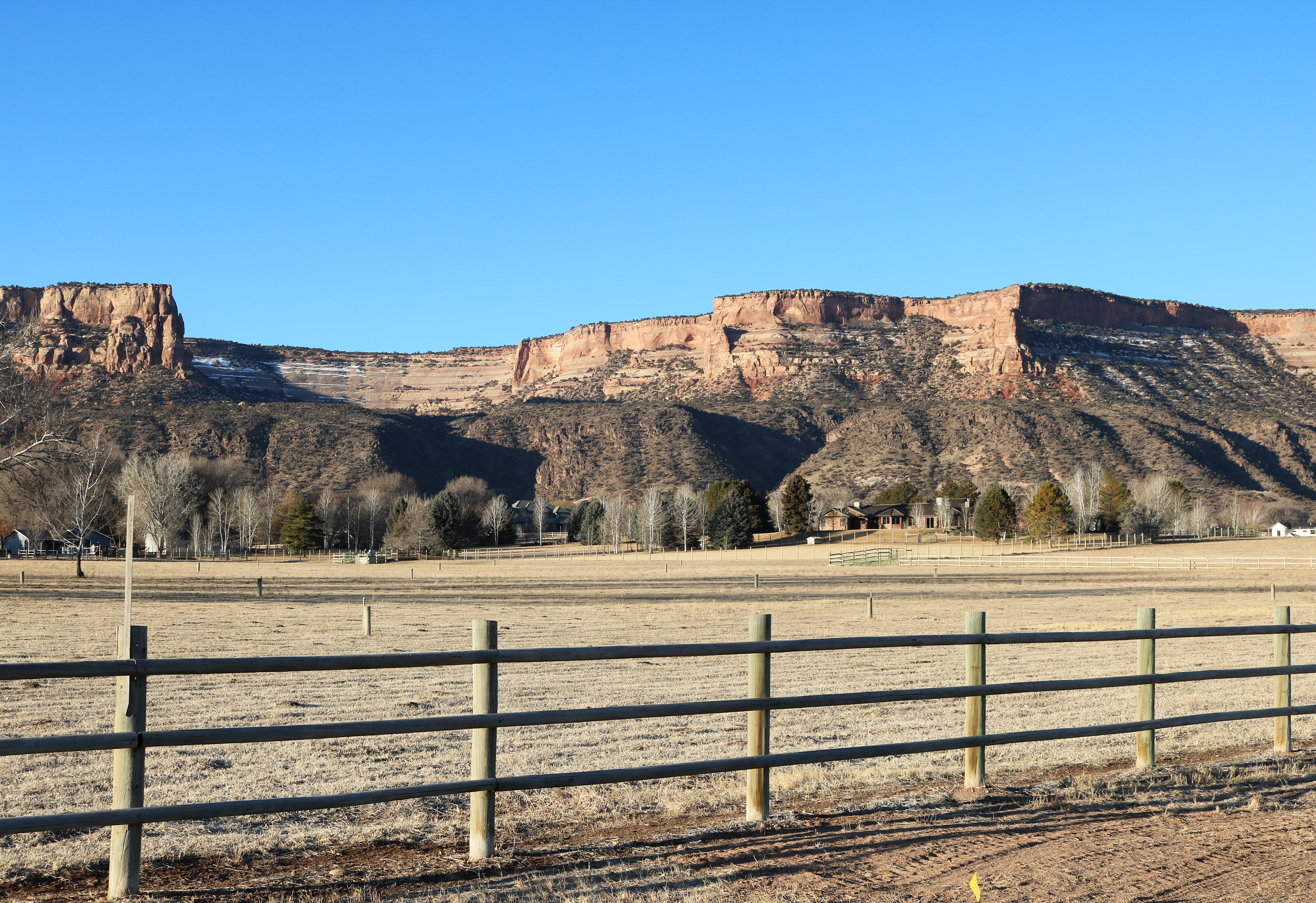
- The northern part of Redlands in 2020

- Location in Mesa County, Colorado
- Coordinates: 39°05′21″N 108°39′34″W
- Country: United States
- State: Colorado
- County: Mesa

Government
  - Type: Unincorporated community

Area
  - Total: 13.446 sq mi (34.82 km^{2})
  - Land: 12.905 sq mi (33.42 km^{2})
  - Water: 0.541 sq mi (1.40 km^{2})
- Elevation: 4,643 ft (1,415 m)

Population (2020)
  - Total: 9,061
  - Density: 702.1/sq mi (271.1/km^{2})
- Time zone: UTC-7 (MST)
  - Summer (DST): UTC-6 (MDT)
- ZIP Code: 81507 (Grand Junction)
- Area code: 970
- GNIS feature: 2409153

Redlands is an unincorporated community and census-designated place (CDP) located in and governed by Mesa County, Colorado, United States. It is part of the Grand Junction, CO Metropolitan Statistical Area. The population of the Redlands CDP was 9,061 at the 2020 census. The Grand Junction post office (ZIP Code 81507) serves the area.

== Geography ==
Redlands is in central Mesa County, lying on the southwest side of the Colorado River between the city of Grand Junction to the east and the city of Fruita to the northwest.

The Redlands CDP has an area of 13.4 square miles (35 km^{2}), including 0.54 square miles (1.40 km^{2}) of water (4.0% of the CDP area).

== Demographics ==
As of the census of 2000, there were 6,913 people, 2,137 households, and 1,506 families residing in the CDP. The population density was 540.1 inhabitants per square mile (208.5/km^{2}). There were 3,227 housing units at an average density of 216.7 per square mile (83.7/km^{2}). The racial makeup of the CDP was 95.93% White, 0.06% African American, 0.41% Native American, 0.46% Asian, 0.05% Pacific Islander, 1.55% from other races, and 1.53% from two or more races. Hispanic or Latino of any race were 5.22% of the population.

There were 3,137 households, out of which 29.1% had children under the age of 18 living with them, 72.5% were married couples living together, 4.9% had a female householder with no husband present, and 20.1% were non-families. 16.7% of all households were made up of individuals, and 7.7% had someone living alone who was 65 years of age or older. The average household size was 2.55 and the average family size was 2.85.

In the CDP, the population was spread out, with 22.6% under the age of 18, 5.1% from 18 to 24, 20.7% from 25 to 44, 32.0% from 45 to 64, and 19.6% who were 65 years of age or older. The median age was 46 years. For every 100 females, there were 99.0 males. For every 100 females age 18 and over, there were 96.2 males.

The median income for a household in the CDP was $53,533, and the median income for a family was $40,667. Males had a median income of $36,250 versus $27,237 for females. The per capita income for the CDP was $29,232. About 8.0% of families and 9.1% of the population were below the poverty line, including 7.1% of those under age 18 and 6.3% of those age 65 or over.

The United States Census Bureau initially defined the Redlands CDP for the 1990 United States census

Redlands CDP, Colorado
Year	Pop.	±%
1990	9,355	—
2000	8,043	−14.0%
2010	8,685	+8.0%
2020	9,061	+4.3%
Source: United States Census Bureau

=== 2020 census ===
As of the 2020 census, Redlands had a population of 9,061. The median age was 50.9 years. 20.1% of residents were under the age of 18 and 28.9% of residents were 65 years of age or older. For every 100 females there were 96.3 males, and for every 100 females age 18 and over there were 95.9 males age 18 and over.

96.9% of residents lived in urban areas, while 3.1% lived in rural areas.

There were 3,631 households in Redlands, of which 25.0% had children under the age of 18 living in them. Of all households, 65.3% were married-couple households, 12.8% were households with a male householder and no spouse or partner present, and 17.7% were households with a female householder and no spouse or partner present. About 21.1% of all households were made up of individuals and 13.3% had someone living alone who was 65 years of age or older.

There were 3,823 housing units, of which 5.0% were vacant. The homeowner vacancy rate was 1.2% and the rental vacancy rate was 6.6%.

Racial composition as of the 2020 census
Race	Number	Percent
White	8,024	88.6%
Black or African American	28	0.3%
American Indian and Alaska Native	38	0.4%
Asian	104	1.1%
Native Hawaiian and Other Pacific Islander	4	0.0%
Some other race	123	1.4%
Two or more races	740	8.2%
Hispanic or Latino (of any race)	640	7.1%

== See also ==
- List of statistical areas in Colorado
- Grand Junction, CO Metropolitan Statistical Area
