= Fruitvale, Colorado =

Census-designated place in Mesa County, CO, USA

- Census-designated place
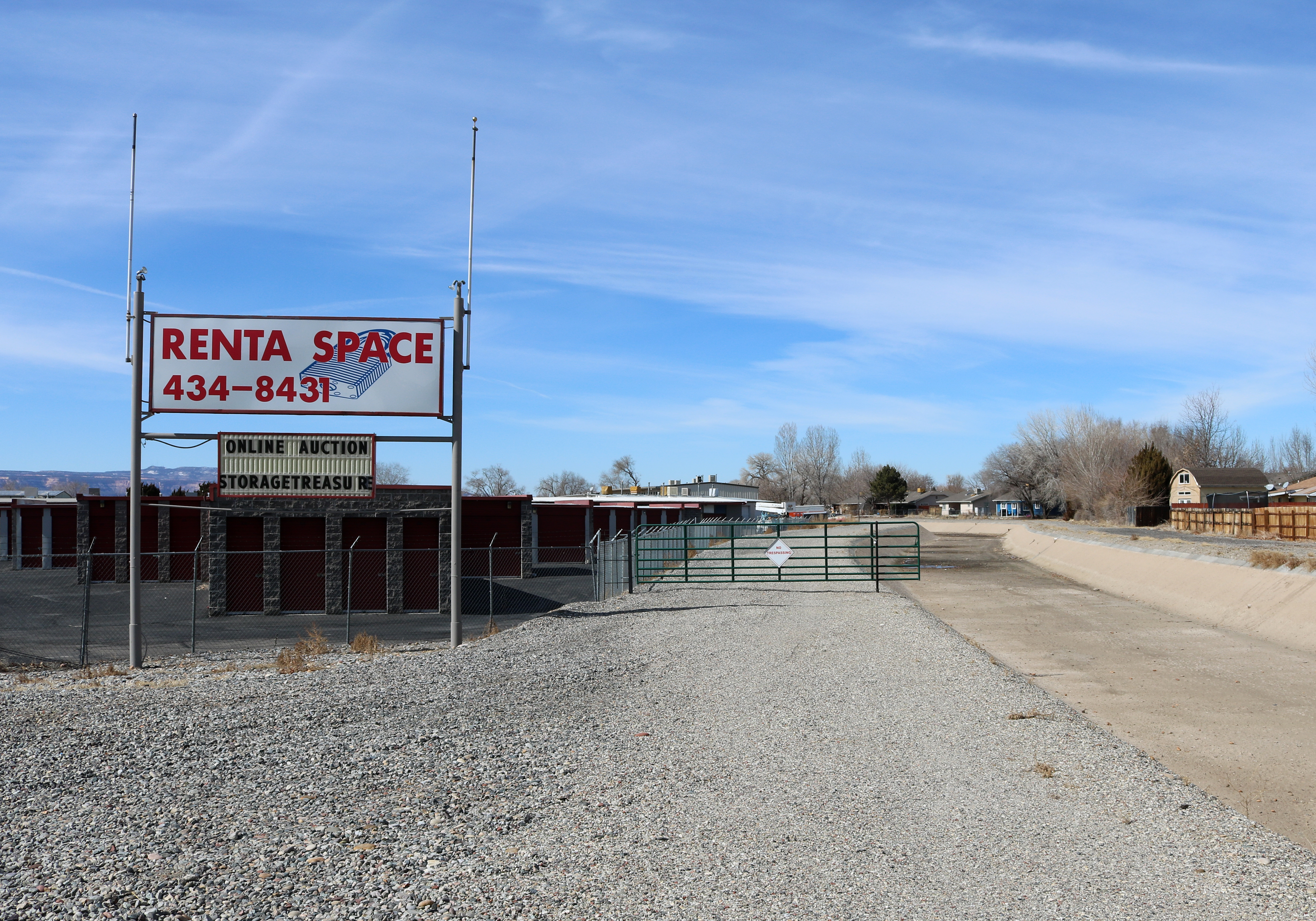
- The Grand Valley Canal (right, dry in winter) passes through part of Fruitvale.

- Location in Mesa County, Colorado
- Coordinates: 39°05′36″N 108°28′44″W
- Country: United States
- State: Colorado
- County: Mesa

Area
  - Total: 2.895 sq mi (7.50 km^{2})
  - Land: 2.895 sq mi (7.50 km^{2})
  - Water: 0.0 sq mi (0 km^{2})
- Elevation: 4,721 ft (1,439 m)

Population (2020)
  - Total: 8,271
  - Density: 2,857/sq mi (1,103/km^{2})
- Time zone: UTC-7 (MST)
  - Summer (DST): UTC-6 (MDT)
- ZIP code: 81504
- Area code: 970
- GNIS feature: 2408269

Fruitvale is a census-designated place (CDP) in and governed by Mesa County, Colorado, United States. It is part of the Grand Junction, CO Metropolitan Statistical Area. The population was 8,271 at the 2020 census, up from 7,675 in 2010. The Grand Junction post office (Zip Code 81504) serves Fruitvale postal addresses.

== Geography ==
Fruitvale is in central Mesa County, bordered to the west by the city of Grand Junction and to the east and south by unincorporated Clifton. Interstate 70 forms the northern edge of the Fruitvale CDP, and U.S. Route 6 forms the southern edge. The CDP has an area of 2.9 square miles (7.5 km^{2}), all land.

=== Climate ===
Climate data for Fruitvale, Colorado
Month	Jan	Feb	Mar	Apr	May	Jun	Jul	Aug	Sep	Oct	Nov	Dec	Year
Mean daily maximum °F (°C)	38 (3)	46 (8)	56 (13)	65 (18)	75 (24)	86 (30)	92 (33)	90 (32)	81 (27)	68 (20)	51 (11)	41 (5)	65.75 (18.75)
Mean daily minimum °F (°C)	17 (−8)	24 (−4)	33 (1)	39 (4)	48 (9)	57 (14)	63 (17)	61 (16)	52 (11)	41 (5)	29 (−2)	19 (−7)	40.25 (4.58)
Source: Intellicast

== Demographics ==
Fruitvale CDP, Colorado
Year	Pop.	±%
1990	5,222	—
2000	6,936	+32.8%
2010	7,675	+10.7%
2020	8,271	+7.8%
Source: United States Census Bureau

The United States Census Bureau initially defined the Fruitvale CDP for the 1990 United States census.

=== 2020 census ===
As of the 2020 census, Fruitvale had a population of 8,271. The median age was 43.0 years. 21.4% of residents were under the age of 18 and 23.3% of residents were 65 years of age or older. For every 100 females there were 98.8 males, and for every 100 females age 18 and over there were 96.4 males age 18 and over.

100.0% of residents lived in urban areas, while 0.0% lived in rural areas.

There were 3,272 households in Fruitvale, of which 28.3% had children under the age of 18 living in them. Of all households, 57.4% were married-couple households, 15.5% were households with a male householder and no spouse or partner present, and 20.8% were households with a female householder and no spouse or partner present. About 23.1% of all households were made up of individuals and 14.0% had someone living alone who was 65 years of age or older.

There were 3,412 housing units, of which 4.1% were vacant. The homeowner vacancy rate was 1.9% and the rental vacancy rate was 7.9%.

Racial composition as of the 2020 census
Race	Number	Percent
White	6,877	83.1%
Black or African American	59	0.7%
American Indian and Alaska Native	73	0.9%
Asian	89	1.1%
Native Hawaiian and Other Pacific Islander	8	0.1%
Some other race	344	4.2%
Two or more races	821	9.9%
Hispanic or Latino (of any race)	1,185	14.3%

== See also ==
- List of census-designated places in Colorado
