= Mesa County, Colorado =

County in Colorado, United States

- County
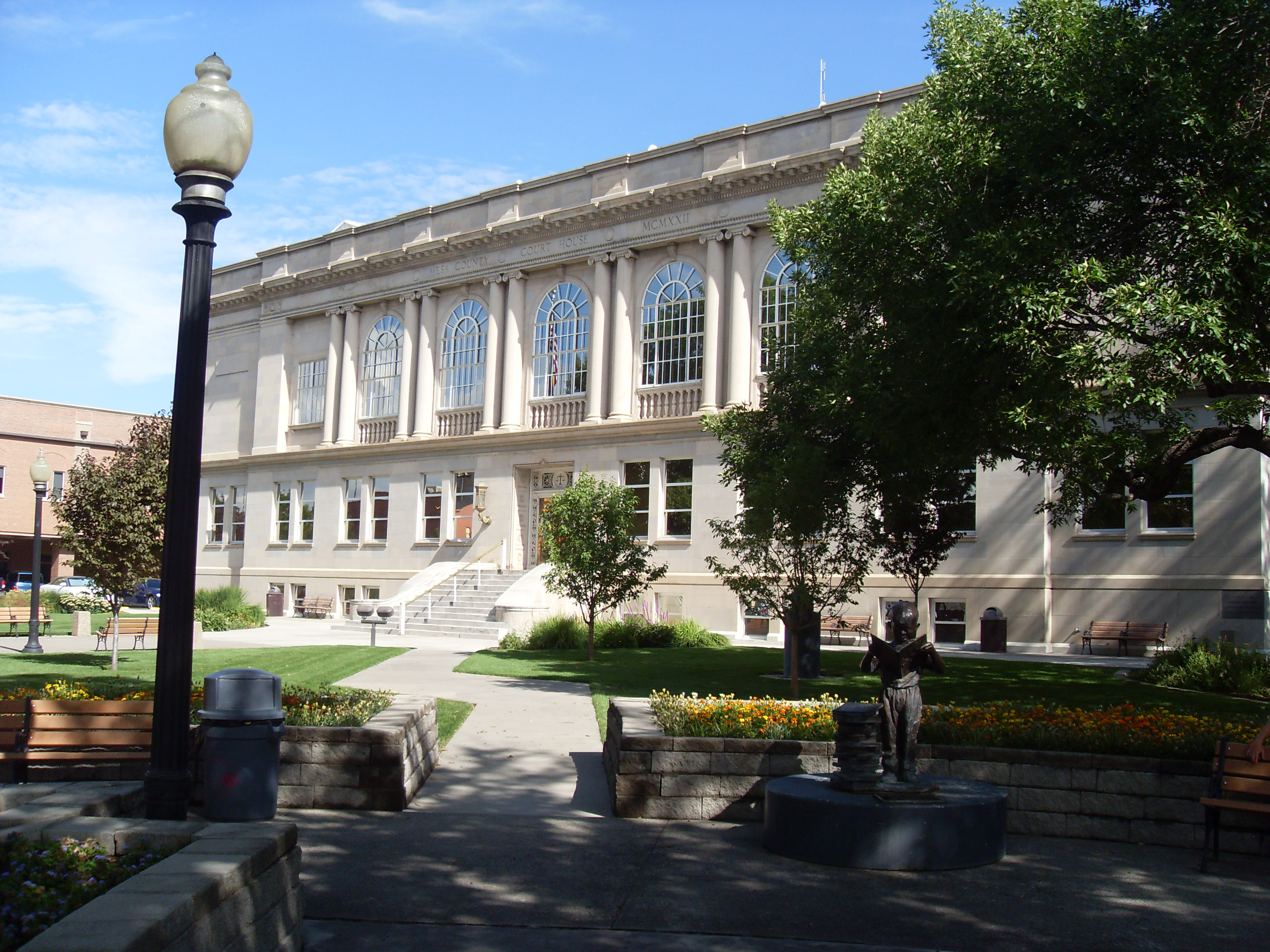
- Wayne N. Aspinall Federal Building and U.S. Courthouse in Grand Junction

- Location within the U.S. state of Colorado
- Coordinates: 39.02°N 108.47°W
- Country: United States
- State: Colorado
- Founded: February 14, 1883
- Named for: Mesas in the area
- Seat: Grand Junction
- Largest city: Grand Junction

Area
  - Total: 3,341 sq mi (8,650 km^{2})
  - Land: 3,329 sq mi (8,620 km^{2})
  - Water: 12 sq mi (31 km^{2}) 0.4%

Population (2020)
  - Total: 155,703
  - Estimate (2025): 162,845 ▲
  - Density: 47/sq mi (18/km^{2})
- Time zone: UTC−7 (Mountain)
  - Summer (DST): UTC−6 (MDT)
- Congressional district: 3rd
- Website: www.mesacounty.us

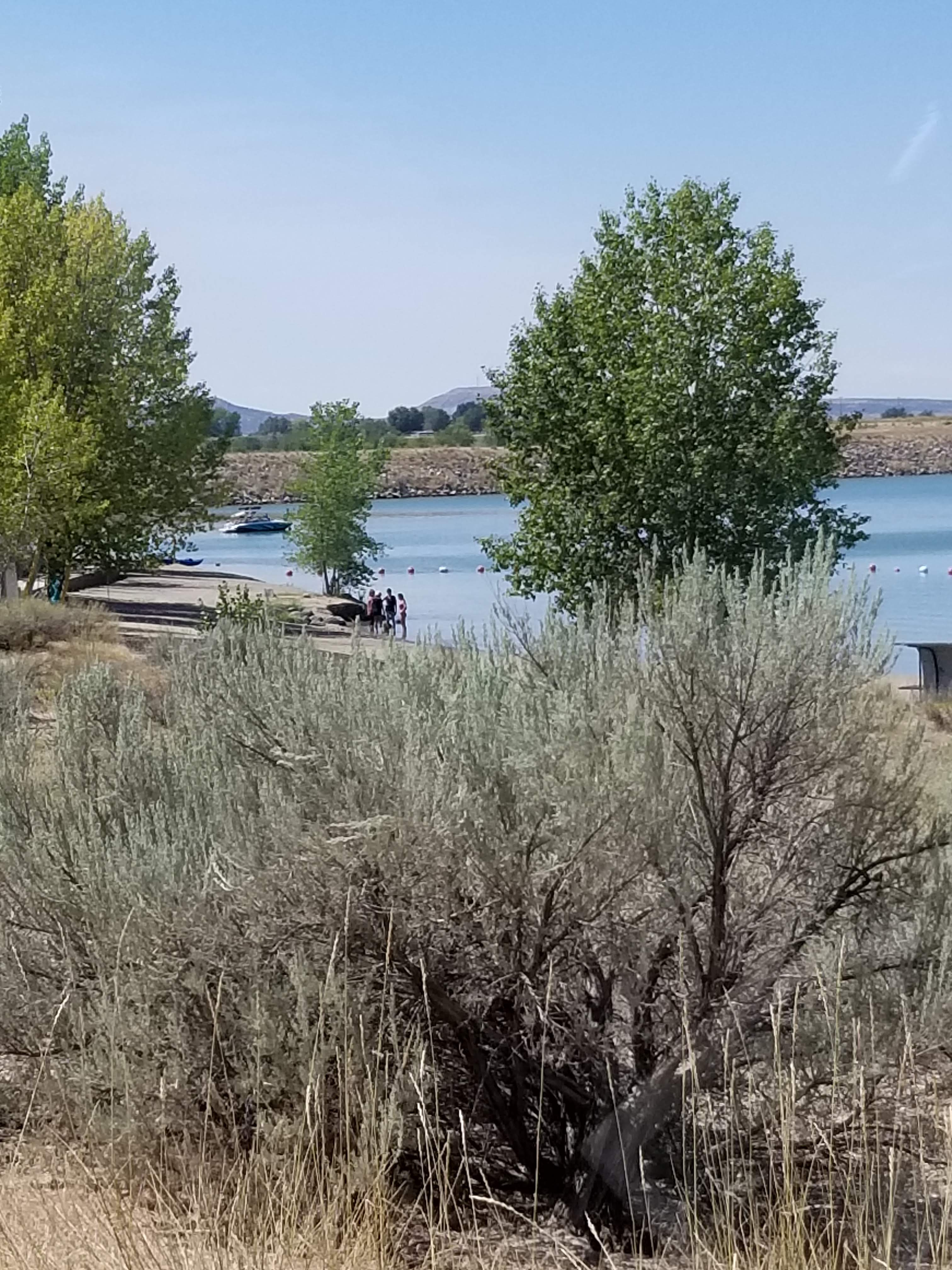
Highline Lake State Park

Mesa County is a county in the U.S. state of Colorado. As of the 2020 census, the population was 155,703, making Mesa County the most populous county in western Colorado, and the 11th-most populous in the state. The county seat and most populous municipality is Grand Junction. The county was named for the many large mesas in the area, including the Grand Mesa, the largest flat-topped mountain in the world.

Mesa County comprises the Grand Junction Metropolitan Statistical Area. In 2020, it was the 271st most populous metropolitan area in the United States. It is Colorado's only metropolitan area not on the Front Range.

== Geography ==
According to the U.S. Census Bureau, the county has an area of 3,341 square miles (8,650 km^{2}), of which 3,329 square miles (8,620 km^{2}) is land and 12 square miles (31 km^{2}) (0.4%) is water. It is Colorado's fourth-largest county by area.

=== Adjacent counties ===
- Garfield County – north
- Pitkin County – east
- Gunnison County – east
- Delta County – southeast
- Montrose County – south
- Grand County, Utah – west

=== Major highways ===
- I-70
  - I-70 BL (Grand Junction–Clifton)
- US 6
- US 50
- SH 65
- SH 139
- SH 141
- SH 330
- SH 340

=== National protected areas ===
- Black Ridge Canyons Wilderness
- Colorado National Monument
- Dominguez Canyon Wilderness
- Dominguez-Escalante National Conservation Area (part)
- Grand Mesa National Forest
- Manti-La Sal National Forest
- McInnis Canyons National Conservation Area (part)
- Uncompahgre National Forest
- White River National Forest

=== State protected areas ===
- Highline Lake State Park
- James M. Robb – Colorado River State Park
- Vega State Park

=== Trails and byways ===
- American Discovery Trail
- Dinosaur Diamond Prehistoric Highway National Scenic Byway
- Grand Mesa National Scenic and Historic Byway
- Kokopelli Trail
- Old Spanish National Historic Trail
- Unaweep/Tabeguache Scenic and Historic Byway
- Colorado Riverfront Trail

== Demographics ==
Historical population
Census	Pop.	Note	%±
1890	4,260		—
1900	9,267		117.5%
1910	22,197		139.5%
1920	22,281		0.4%
1930	25,908		16.3%
1940	33,791		30.4%
1950	38,794		14.8%
1960	50,715		30.7%
1970	54,734		7.9%
1980	81,530		49.0%
1990	93,145		14.2%
2000	116,255		24.8%
2010	146,723		26.2%
2020	155,703		6.1%
2025 (est.)	162,845	▲	4.6%
U.S. Decennial Census; 1790-1960 1900-1990; 1990-2000 2010-2020

=== 2020 census ===
As of the 2020 census, the county had a population of 155,703. Of the residents, 21.0% were under the age of 18 and 20.6% were 65 years of age or older; the median age was 40.7 years. For every 100 females there were 98.0 males, and for every 100 females age 18 and over there were 96.0 males. 87.3% of residents lived in urban areas and 12.7% lived in rural areas.

Mesa County, Colorado – Racial and ethnic composition Note: the US Census treats Hispanic/Latino as an ethnic category. This table excludes Latinos from the racial categories and assigns them to a separate category. Hispanics/Latinos may be of any race.
Race / Ethnicity (NH = Non-Hispanic)	Pop 2000	Pop 2010	Pop 2020	% 2000	% 2010	% 2020
White alone (NH)	101,110	121,944	120,749	86.97%	83.11%	77.55%
Black or African American alone (NH)	460	776	1,020	0.40%	0.53%	0.66%
Native American or Alaska Native alone (NH)	728	896	933	0.63%	0.61%	0.60%
Asian alone (NH)	593	1,059	1,613	0.51%	0.72%	1.04%
Pacific Islander alone (NH)	105	150	188	0.09%	0.10%	0.12%
Other race alone (NH)	110	133	889	0.09%	0.09%	0.57%
Mixed race or Multiracial (NH)	1,498	2,213	7,033	1.29%	1.51%	4.52%
Hispanic or Latino (any race)	11,651	19,552	23,278	10.02%	13.33%	14.95%
Total	116,255	146,723	155,703	100.00%	100.00%	100.00%

The racial makeup of the county was 82.2% White, 0.7% Black or African American, 1.1% American Indian and Alaska Native, 1.1% Asian, 0.1% Native Hawaiian and Pacific Islander, 5.0% from some other race, and 9.7% from two or more races. Hispanic or Latino residents of any race comprised 15.0% of the population.

There were 63,133 households in the county, of which 26.9% had children under the age of 18 living with them and 25.8% had a female householder with no spouse or partner present. About 28.2% of all households were made up of individuals and 13.3% had someone living alone who was 65 years of age or older.

There were 67,407 housing units, of which 6.3% were vacant. Among occupied housing units, 71.3% were owner-occupied and 28.7% were renter-occupied. The homeowner vacancy rate was 1.5% and the rental vacancy rate was 6.6%.

=== 2010 census ===
As of the 2010 census, there were 146,723 people, 58,095 households, and 38,593 families living in the county. The population density was 44.1 people per square mile (17.0 people/km^{2}). There were 62,644 housing units.

There were 45,823 households, of which 31.4% had children under the age of 18 living with them, 55.3% were married couples living together, 9.8% had a female householder with no husband present, and 31.1% were non-families. 25.1% of all households were made up of individuals, and 10.3% had someone living alone who was 65 years of age or older. The average household size was 2.47 and the average family size was 2.94.

In the county, 25.0% of the population was under the age of 18, 9.4% was from 18 to 24, 26.7% from 25 to 44, 23.7% from 45 to 64, and 15.2% was 65 years of age or older. The median age was 38 years. For every 100 females there were 96.0 males. For every 100 females age 18 and over, there were 93.2 males.

The median income for a household in the county was $35,864, and the median income for a family was $43,009. Males had a median income of $32,316 versus $22,374 for females. The per capita income for the county was $18,715. About 7.0% of families and 10.2% of the population were below the poverty line, including 11.5% of those under age 18 and 8.1% of those age 65 or over.

=== 2000 census ===
According to the 2000 American Factfinder data, the racial makeup of the county was 92.34% White, 0.46% Black or African American, 0.91% Native American, 0.53% Asian, 0.10% Pacific Islander, 3.67% from other races, and 1.99% from two or more races. 10.02% of the population were Hispanic or Latino of any race.

== Education ==
Much of Mesa County, namely the communities of Grand Junction, Fruita, Palisade, Clifton, Redlands, Fruitvale, and Orchard Mesa, are served by Mesa County Valley School District 51. This district serves nearly 21,000 students across 47 schools, making it by far western Colorado's largest school district. De Beque Joint District 49 serves the town of De Beque, while the Plateau Valley School District serves the town of Collbran and other communities atop the Grand Mesa.

Colorado Mesa University (CMU), a public liberal arts university serving roughly 10,000 students annually, is in Grand Junction. CMU is western Colorado's largest university, making Mesa County an epicenter of the region's higher education. CMU also operates CMU Tech in northwestern Grand Junction, and a Community Education Campus in Clifton. Grand Junction is also home to IntelliTec College, which offers professional certificates.

== Politics ==
Unlike most urban counties, Mesa County is heavily Republican. It has voted for a Democratic presidential nominee only once since 1952, during Lyndon Johnson's 1964 landslide. In 1968, Hubert Humphrey was the last Democratic nominee to win 40% of the county's vote.

In 2024, although the county stayed very Republican, it swung about 4% leftward. Democratic nominee Kamala Harris won the highest vote share in the county since 1996.

=== Elected officials ===
Position	Elected official
County Commissioner, District 1	Cody Davis
County Commissioner, District 2	Bobbie Daniel
County Commissioner, District 3	JJ Fletcher
County Assessor	Brent Goff
County Clerk and Recorder	Bobbie Gross
County Coroner	Dean Havlik
District Attorney	Daniel Rubinstein
County Sheriff	Todd Rowell
County Surveyor	Scott Thompson
County Treasurer/Public Trustee	Sheila Reiner

=== 2020–2021 county clerk election tampering ===
It was reported in August 2021 that in May 2021 Mesa County Clerk Tina Peters allowed an unauthorized person into a secure facility during an annual upgrade to the county's election equipment software, compromising the equipment. The security breach meant Mesa County could not use the equipment in its fall 2021 election.

This was not the first time Peters had been a source of election controversy. In February 2020, it was discovered that her office neglected to count 574 ballots cast in a dropbox outside her office. These uncounted ballots were cast in the November 2019 election and remained uncounted for three months. They were found only because Peters's office checked the dropbox for ballots cast in the 2020 presidential primary. This prompted an attempt to recall Peters as county clerk. The effort was unsuccessful.

In March 2022, a Mesa County grand jury indicted Peters on seven felony and three misdemeanor counts of election tampering and misconduct related to the alleged May 2021 security breach. Her deputy, Belinda Knisley, was charged on six counts. At the time of indictment, Peters was a candidate for Colorado Secretary of State, a position that would involve supervising the state's elections. In May 2022, a Colorado district judge prohibited Peters and Knisley from overseeing November 2022 Mesa County elections, the second year of such a prohibition.

On August 12, 2024, Peters was convicted on seven of the ten charges against her, including four felonies. A Mesa County jury found Peters guilty of three counts of attempting to influence a public servant, and one count each of conspiracy to commit criminal impersonation, official misconduct, violation of duty, and failure to comply with the Secretary of State. She was acquitted on the remaining three charges against her, which included identity theft and criminal impersonation.

On October 3, 2024, Peters was sentenced to nine years in prison, with the first six months to be served in the Mesa County Detention Facility and the remaining 8.5 years to be served in the Colorado Department of Corrections. She was also fined $3,000. Peters eventually received a commutation and was released from prison on June 1, 2026, having served less than a quarter of her nine-year sentence.

United States presidential election results for Mesa County, Colorado
Year	Republican		Democratic		Third party(ies)	
Year	No.	%	No.	%	No.	%
1884	353	51.38%	329	47.89%	5	0.73%
1888	440	49.49%	388	43.64%	61	6.86%
1892	529	42.76%	0	0.00%	708	57.24%
1896	469	15.81%	2,374	80.04%	123	4.15%
1900	1,317	37.27%	1,968	55.69%	249	7.05%
1904	2,783	58.45%	1,555	32.66%	423	8.88%
1908	3,049	44.87%	2,824	41.56%	922	13.57%
1912	976	12.47%	2,733	34.93%	4,115	52.59%
1916	2,223	30.06%	4,394	59.42%	778	10.52%
1920	3,621	49.80%	3,138	43.16%	512	7.04%
1924	4,053	45.53%	2,388	26.83%	2,461	27.65%
1928	6,446	65.76%	3,223	32.88%	133	1.36%
1932	4,388	37.16%	6,682	56.59%	737	6.24%
1936	3,654	29.47%	7,824	63.10%	921	7.43%
1940	7,049	47.27%	7,694	51.60%	169	1.13%
1944	6,653	48.93%	6,870	50.52%	75	0.55%
1948	6,586	43.37%	8,401	55.32%	198	1.30%
1952	11,883	63.06%	6,883	36.52%	79	0.42%
1956	12,869	62.79%	7,567	36.92%	60	0.29%
1960	13,015	58.81%	9,072	40.99%	45	0.20%
1964	8,317	39.45%	12,716	60.32%	49	0.23%
1968	10,745	49.58%	8,775	40.49%	2,151	9.93%
1972	15,527	68.66%	6,358	28.12%	728	3.22%
1976	17,924	65.44%	8,807	32.15%	659	2.41%
1980	22,686	68.92%	7,549	22.93%	2,681	8.14%
1984	23,736	69.66%	9,938	29.17%	400	1.17%
1988	22,150	59.62%	14,372	38.68%	633	1.70%
1992	18,169	41.23%	15,162	34.41%	10,736	24.36%
1996	24,761	53.12%	17,114	36.72%	4,737	10.16%
2000	32,396	63.45%	15,465	30.29%	3,193	6.25%
2004	41,539	67.12%	19,564	31.61%	782	1.26%
2008	44,578	64.02%	24,008	34.48%	1,045	1.50%
2012	47,472	65.08%	23,846	32.69%	1,629	2.23%
2016	49,779	64.10%	21,729	27.98%	6,146	7.91%
2020	56,894	62.78%	31,536	34.80%	2,193	2.42%
2024	55,839	60.95%	33,573	36.64%	2,208	2.41%

United States Senate election results for Mesa County, Colorado2
Year	Republican		Democratic		Third party(ies)	
Year	No.	%	No.	%	No.	%
2020	57,236	64.17%	29,478	33.05%	2,486	2.79%

United States Senate election results for Mesa County, Colorado3
Year	Republican		Democratic		Third party(ies)	
Year	No.	%	No.	%	No.	%
2022	41,766	56.87%	28,732	39.13%	2,937	4.00%

Colorado Gubernatorial election results for Mesa County
Year	Republican		Democratic		Third party(ies)	
Year	No.	%	No.	%	No.	%
2022	40,376	54.90%	30,571	41.56%	2,604	3.54%

== Communities ==
=== Cities ===
- Fruita
- Grand Junction (county seat)

=== Towns ===
- Collbran
- De Beque
- Palisade

=== Census-designated places ===
- Clifton
- Fruitvale
- Loma
- Orchard Mesa
- Redlands

=== Unincorporated communities ===
- Appleton
- Bridges Switch
- Gateway
- Glade Park
- Mack
- Mesa
- Molina
- Mount Lincoln
- Plateau City
- Whitewater

=== Ghost towns ===
- Akin
- Cameo
- Carpenter

== Transportation ==
=== Road ===
- Interstate 70 runs from Interstate 15 in Cove Fort, Utah to Baltimore, Maryland, connecting Grand Junction to Denver, Kansas City, St. Louis, Indianapolis, and Columbus. Via Interstate 15, it connects Grand Junction with Las Vegas, Nevada, and southern California.
- U.S. Highway 6 serves 14 states, running east–west from Provincetown, Massachusetts, to Bishop, California. In Colorado, it generally runs parallel to Interstate 76 and Interstate 70.
- U.S. Highway 50 crosses 12 states, linking Ocean City, Maryland, with Sacramento, California. In Colorado, U.S. 50 connects Grand Junction with Montrose, Gunnison, and Pueblo, and to the west, it travels into Utah.
- SH 340 runs east–west, starting at First Street in downtown Grand Junction, traversing the Redlands and ending at U.S. Highway 6 and U.S. Highway 50 in Fruita.

=== Air ===
Downtown Grand Junction is 4.8 miles from Grand Junction Regional Airport, 25 miles from Mack Mesa Airport, and 12.6 miles from Pinyon Airport.

=== Train ===
An Amtrak station is in downtown Grand Junction. The California Zephyr makes daily stops on its way between San Francisco and Chicago.

=== Bus ===
A regional Bustang bus stop is in Grand Junction. Grand Valley Transit serves the area's eleven fixed routes.

== See also ==
- Bibliography of Colorado
- Geography of Colorado
- History of Colorado
  - National Register of Historic Places listings in Mesa County, Colorado
- Index of Colorado-related articles
- List of Colorado-related lists
  - List of counties in Colorado
  - List of statistical areas in Colorado
- Outline of Colorado
  - Grand Valley AVA
  - Mesa County Public Library District
