= Clifton, Colorado =

Unincorporated community in Colorado, US

- Census-designated place
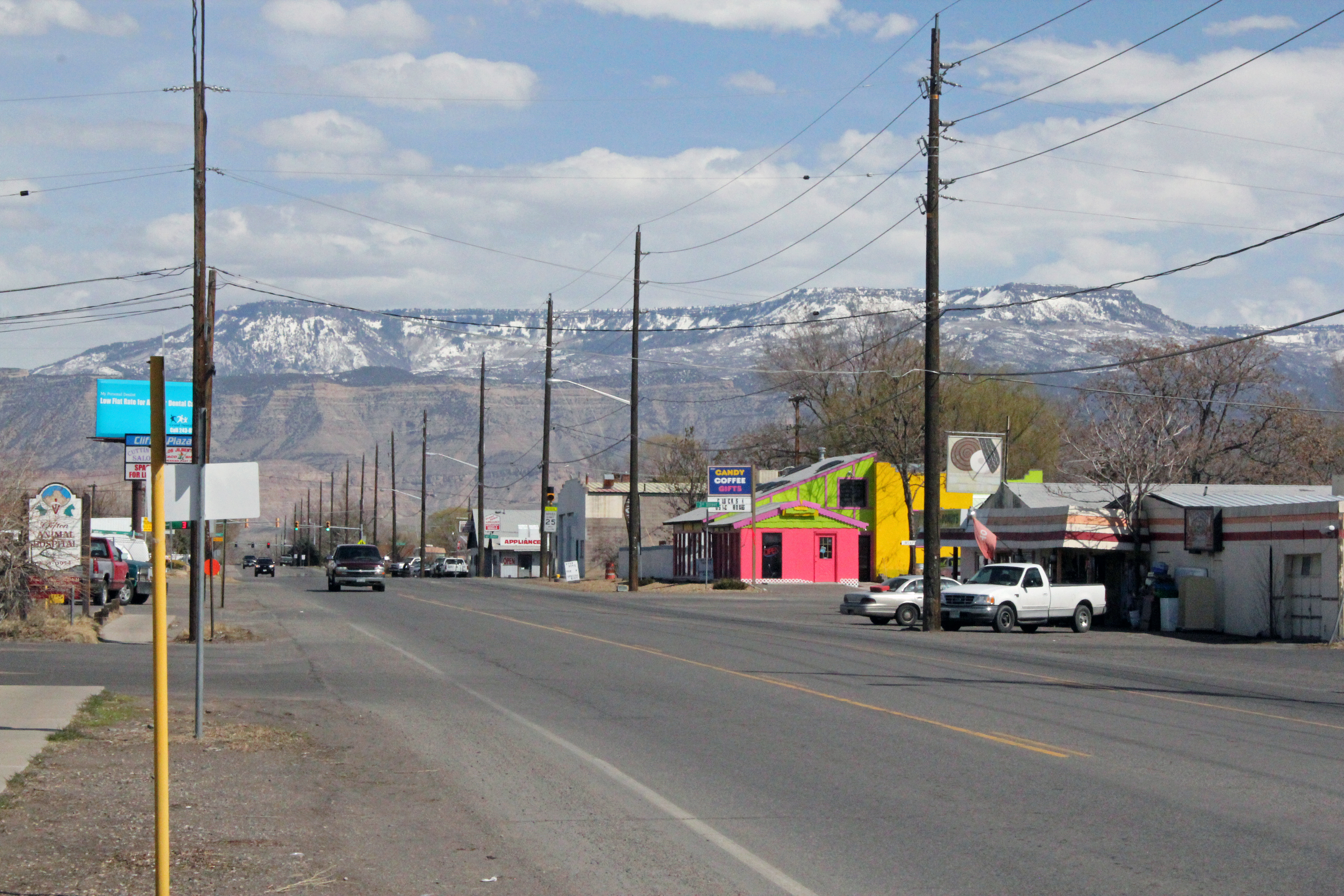
- U.S. Route 6 in Clifton looking toward Grand Mesa

- Location in Mesa County, Colorado
- Coordinates: 39°04′35″N 108°27′38″W
- Country: United States
- State: Colorado
- County: Mesa

Government
  - Type: Unincorporated community
  - Body: Mesa County

Area
  - Total: 6.061 sq mi (15.70 km^{2})
  - Land: 5.988 sq mi (15.51 km^{2})
  - Water: 0.073 sq mi (0.19 km^{2})
- Elevation: 4,721 ft (1,439 m)

Population (2020)
  - Total: 20,413
  - Density: 3,409/sq mi (1,316/km^{2})
- Time zone: UTC−07:00 (MST)
  - Summer (DST): UTC−06:00 (MDT)
- ZIP code: 81520 & 81504
- Area codes: 970/748
- GNIS CDP ID: 2407634
- FIPS code: 08-15165

Clifton is an unincorporated community, a census-designated place (CDP), and a post office in Mesa County, Colorado, United States. It is part of the Grand Junction, CO Metropolitan Statistical Area. The Clifton post office has the ZIP Code 81520. As of the 2020 census, the population of the Clifton CDP was 20,413.

== History ==
The Clifton, Colorado, post office opened on August 18, 1900 The community was named for cliffs near the town site.

== Geography ==
Clifton is in central Mesa County, bordered to the west by the city of Grand Junction and to the northwest by unincorporated Fruitvale. The Colorado River forms the southern edge of the community. U.S. Route 6 passes through the center of Clifton, leading west 6 miles (10 km) to the center of Grand Junction and east the same distance to Palisade. Interstate 70 passes along the northern edge of Clifton, with access from Exit 37 (I-70 Business). Colorado State Highway 141 leads south from US 6, 5 miles (8 km) to U.S. Route 50. The Clifton CDP has an area of 6.1 square miles (16 km^{2}), of which 0.07 square miles (0.18 km^{2}), or 1.20%, are water.

== Education ==
Clifton is within Mesa County Valley School District 51. The community is home to Clifton Elementary School, Rocky Mountain Elementary School and Mount Garfield Middle School. The students of Clifton are primarily served by Central High School.

Colorado Mesa University Tech operates a community campus in Clifton, offering technical certificates and non-credit courses open to the public.

== Demographics ==
Clifton CDP, Colorado
| Year | Pop. | ±% |
|---|---|---|
| 1970 | 5,223 | — |
| 1980 | 6,597 | +26.3% |
| 1990 | 12,671 | +92.1% |
| 2000 | 12,238 | −3.4% |
| 2010 | 19,889 | +62.5% |
| 2020 | 20,413 | +2.6% |
Source: United States Census Bureau

=== 2020 census ===
As of the 2020 census, Clifton had a population of 20,413. The median age was 35.1 years. 26.0% of residents were under the age of 18 and 14.3% of residents were 65 years of age or older. For every 100 females there were 96.7 males, and for every 100 females age 18 and over there were 94.5 males age 18 and over.

99.6% of residents lived in urban areas, while 0.4% lived in rural areas.

There were 7,790 households in Clifton, of which 33.2% had children under the age of 18 living in them. Of all households, 42.0% were married-couple households, 20.6% were households with a male householder and no spouse or partner present, and 28.8% were households with a female householder and no spouse or partner present. About 25.0% of all households were made up of individuals and 10.4% had someone living alone who was 65 years of age or older.

There were 8,112 housing units, of which 4.0% were vacant. The homeowner vacancy rate was 1.2% and the rental vacancy rate was 5.6%.

Racial composition as of the 2020 census
| Race | Number | Percent |
|---|---|---|
| White | 15,315 | 75.0% |
| Black or African American | 158 | 0.8% |
| American Indian and Alaska Native | 327 | 1.6% |
| Asian | 97 | 0.5% |
| Native Hawaiian and Other Pacific Islander | 13 | 0.1% |
| Some other race | 1,971 | 9.7% |
| Two or more races | 2,532 | 12.4% |
| Hispanic or Latino (of any race) | 4,922 | 24.1% |

The United States Census Bureau initially defined the Clifton CDP for the 1980 United States census.

== See also ==
- Grand Junction, CO Metropolitan Statistical Area
