= Orchard Mesa, Colorado =

Census-designated place in Mesa County, CO, USA

- Census-designated place
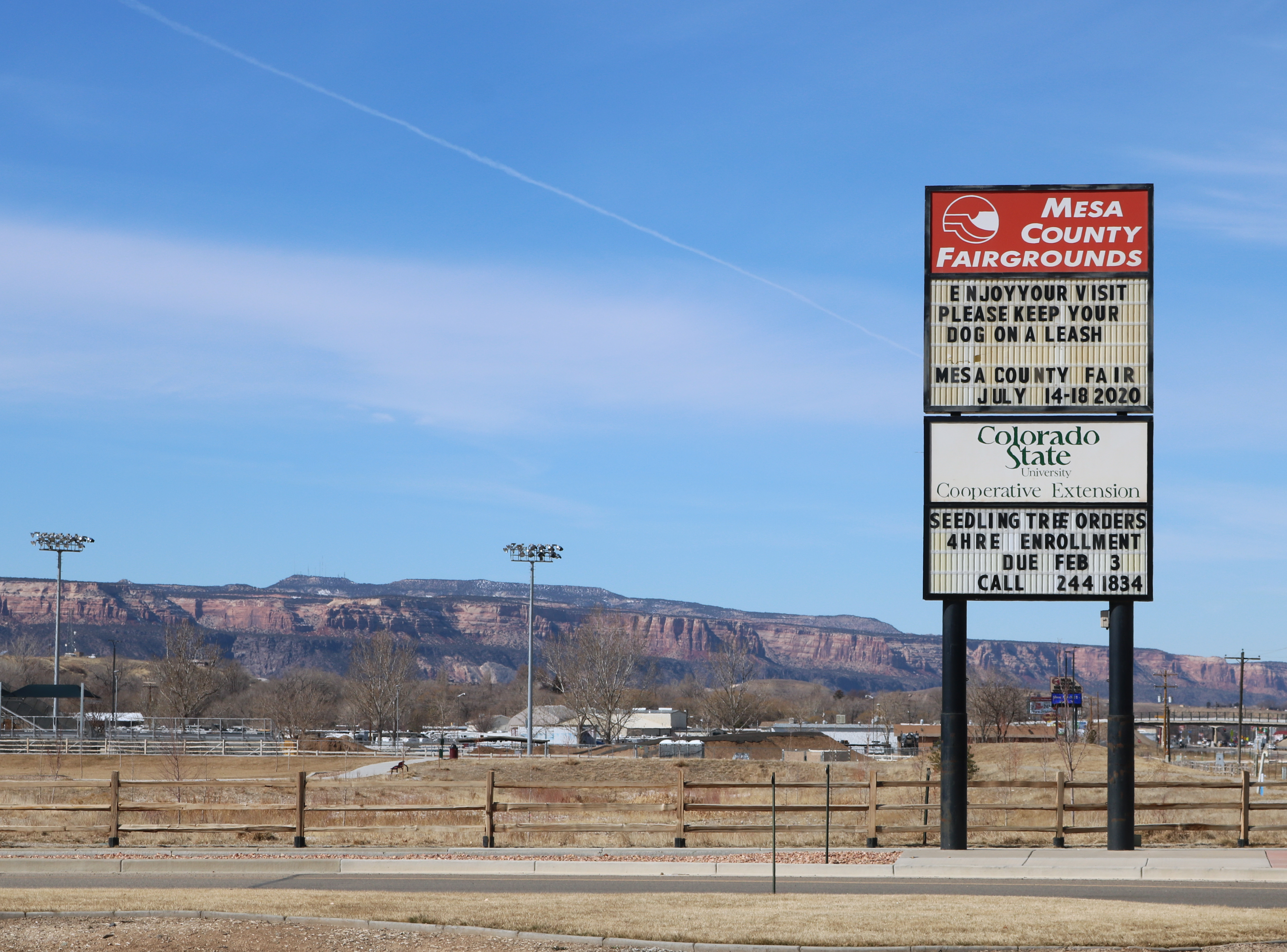
- Mesa County Fairgrounds

- Location in Mesa County, Colorado
- Coordinates: 39°01′48″N 108°30′07″W
- Country: United States
- State: Colorado
- County: Mesa

Government
  - Type: Unincorporated community

Area
  - Total: 3.757 sq mi (9.73 km^{2})
  - Land: 3.667 sq mi (9.50 km^{2})
  - Water: 0.090 sq mi (0.23 km^{2})
- Elevation: 4,682 ft (1,427 m)

Population (2020)
  - Total: 6,688
  - Density: 1,823.8/sq mi (704.2/km^{2})
- Time zone: UTC-7 (MST)
  - Summer (DST): UTC-6 (MDT)
- ZIP Code: 81503 (Grand Junction)
- Area code: 970
- GNIS feature: 2408997

Orchard Mesa is a census-designated place (CDP) in and governed by Mesa County, Colorado, United States. It is part of the Grand Junction, CO Metropolitan Statistical Area. The population of the Orchard Mesa CDP was 6,688 at the 2020 census. The Grand Junction post office (ZIP Code 81503) serves the area.

== Geography ==
Orchard Mesa is in central Mesa County, on the southeast side of the city of Grand Junction, the county seat. It is bordered to the north by the Colorado River and to the southwest by the Gunnison River, its tributary. U.S. Route 50 passes through the community, leading northwest into Grand Junction and southeast 37 miles (60 km) to Delta. The Orchard Mesa CDP has an area of 3.8 square miles (9.8 km^{2}), of which 0.09 square miles (0.23 km^{2}), or 2.40%, are water.

== Demographics ==
Orchard Mesa CDP, Colorado
| Year | Pop. | ±% |
|---|---|---|
| 1960 | 4,956 | — |
| 1970 | 5,824 | +17.5% |
| 1980 | 4,876 | −16.3% |
| 1990 | 5,977 | +22.6% |
| 2000 | 6,456 | +8.0% |
| 2010 | 6,836 | +5.9% |
| 2020 | 6,688 | −2.2% |
Source: United States Census Bureau

The United States Census Bureau initially defined the Orchard Mesa CDP for the 1960 United States census.

=== 2020 census ===
As of the 2020 census, Orchard Mesa had a population of 6,688. The median age was 42.9 years. 20.5% of residents were under the age of 18 and 20.9% of residents were 65 years of age or older. For every 100 females there were 102.2 males, and for every 100 females age 18 and over there were 99.3 males age 18 and over.

99.2% of residents lived in urban areas, while 0.8% lived in rural areas.

There were 2,613 households in Orchard Mesa, of which 25.5% had children under the age of 18 living in them. Of all households, 52.8% were married-couple households, 17.3% were households with a male householder and no spouse or partner present, and 23.1% were households with a female householder and no spouse or partner present. About 23.6% of all households were made up of individuals and 11.3% had someone living alone who was 65 years of age or older.

There were 2,726 housing units, of which 4.1% were vacant. The homeowner vacancy rate was 1.5% and the rental vacancy rate was 7.2%.

Racial composition as of the 2020 census
| Race | Number | Percent |
|---|---|---|
| White | 5,620 | 84.0% |
| Black or African American | 34 | 0.5% |
| American Indian and Alaska Native | 86 | 1.3% |
| Asian | 54 | 0.8% |
| Native Hawaiian and Other Pacific Islander | 4 | 0.1% |
| Some other race | 296 | 4.4% |
| Two or more races | 594 | 8.9% |
| Hispanic or Latino (of any race) | 907 | 13.6% |

== See also ==
- List of census-designated places in Colorado
