= Grand Valley Diversion Dam =

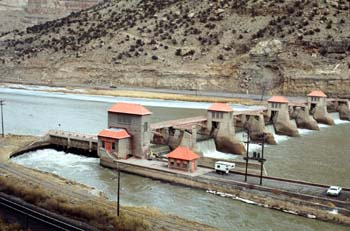
- Interactive map of Grand Valley Diversion Dam
- Location: Mesa County, near Palisade, Colorado, United States
- Coordinates: 39°11′20″N 108°16′55″W
- Construction began: 1913
- Opening date: 1916

Dam and spillways
- Type of dam: Roller gate weir
- Impounds: Colorado River
- Height: 14 ft (4.3 m)
- Length: 546 ft (166 m)

Power Station
- Commission date: 1933
- Installed capacity: 3,000 KW
- Annual generation: 19,350,600 KWh
- Grand Valley Diversion Dam
- U.S. National Register of Historic Places
- U.S. Historic district
- Location within Colorado Location within the United States
- Nearest city: Palisade, Colorado
- Coordinates: 39°11′20″N 108°16′53″W
- Area: 4.8 acres (1.9 ha)
- Built: 1913
- Built by: U.S. Reclamation Service
- Architectural style: Roller-gate dam
- NRHP reference No.: 91001485
- Added to NRHP: October 8, 1991

The Grand Valley Diversion Dam is a diversion dam in the De Beque Canyon of the Colorado River, about 15 miles (24 km) northeast of Grand Junction, Colorado in the United States. It is a 14-foot (4.3 m) high, 546-foot (166 m) long concrete roller dam with six gates, which were the first and largest of their kind to be installed in the United States.

The dam was built between 1913 and 1916 as part of the Grand Valley Project of the U.S. Bureau of Reclamation (USBR) and diverts water into the Government Highline Canal for the full irrigation of 33,368 acres (13,504 ha) and supplemental irrigation to 8,600 acres (3,500 ha) in western Colorado's Grand Valley. A small hydroelectric plant with a capacity of 3,000 kilowatts (KW) was completed in 1933 on the Orchard Mesa Power Canal, a branch of the Government Highline Canal. In 1949, the dam and canal system were transferred to the Grand Valley Water Users Association, while the power plant was consigned to the Orchard Mesa Irrigation District.

Grand Valley Diversion Dam was listed on the National Register of Historic Places on October 8, 1991.
