= Grand Valley AVA =

Viticultural area in Colorado

Coordinates: 39°07′01″N 108°21′44″W

Grand Valley
- Wine region
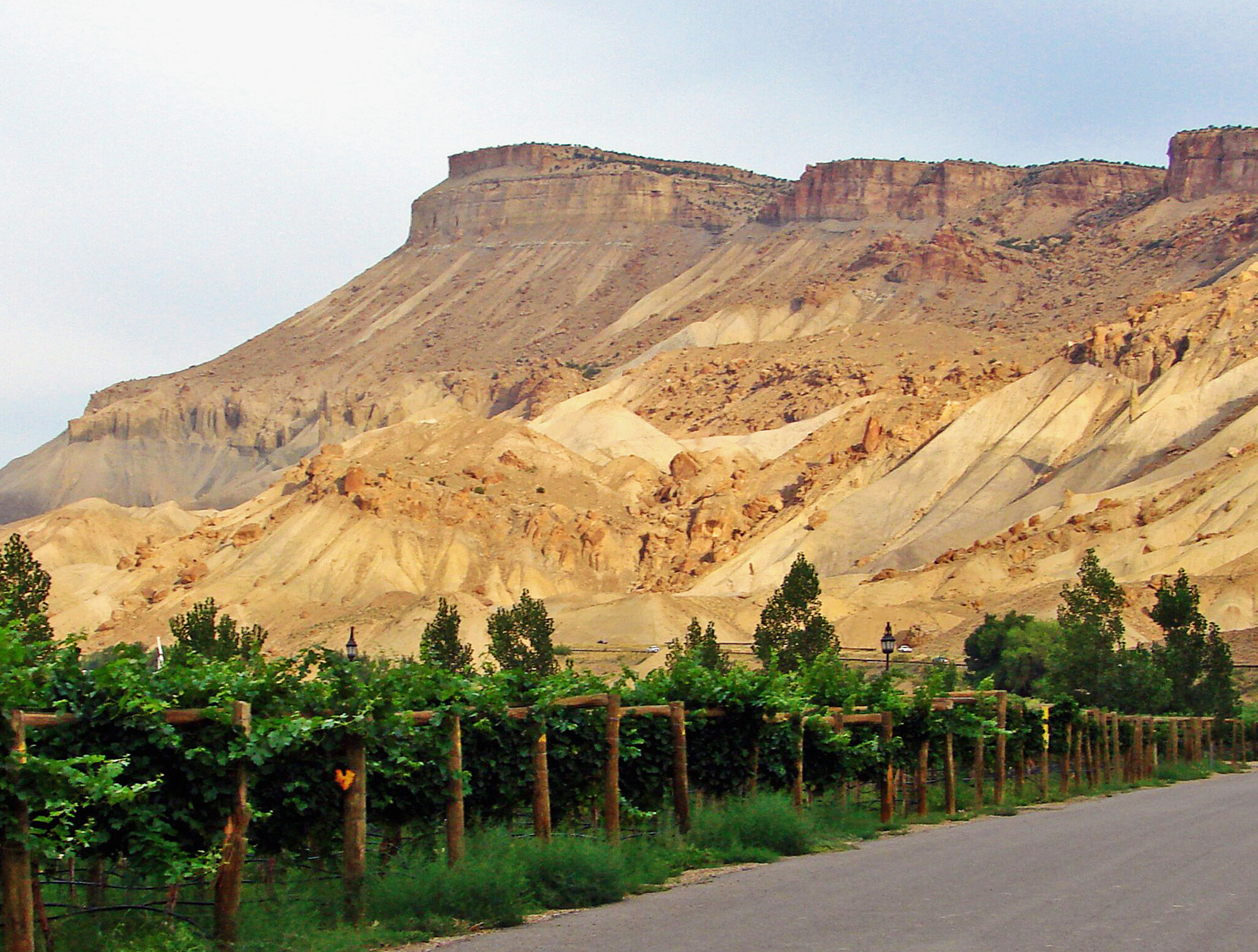
- Vineyards below Mt. Garfield in Palisade
- Type: American Viticultural Area
- Year established: 1991
- Years of wine industry: 136
- Country: United States
- Part of: Colorado
- Other regions in Colorado: West Elks AVA
- Climate region: Continental, Semi-arid
- Precipitation (annual average): 9.06 in (230.12 mm) snow: 22 in (56 cm)
- Soil conditions: sandy Genola, Hinman, Mayfield, Mesa, Ravola, and Thoroughfare
- Total area: 75,990 acres (118.73 sq mi)
- Size of planted vineyards: 800 acres (320 ha)
- Grapes produced: Black Muscat, Cabernet Franc, Cabernet Sauvignon, Chardonnay, Cinsault, Gewurztraminer, Malbec, Merlot, Muscat Ottonel, Orange Muscat, Pinot gris, Riesling, Rkatsiteli, Sangiovese, Sauvignon blanc, Semillon, Syrah, Viognier
- No. of wineries: 30

Grand Valley is an American Viticultural Area (AVA) within Mesa County, Colorado located in a high-altitude river valley surrounding the county seat of Grand Junction and stretching 24 miles (39 km) east-west between the municipalities of Palisade and Fruita. It lies approximately 200 miles (320 km) west-southwest of Denver along Interstate 70. The river valley encompasses 75,990 acres (118.73 sq mi), with an average elevation between 4,000 and 5,000 feet (1,200–1,500 m) above sea level and is defined by an irrigated agricultural area served by canals in the Grand Valley of the Colorado River. It was established as the nation's 113^{th} and the Centennial State's initial appellation on November 25, 1991 by the Bureau of Alcohol, Tobacco and Firearms (ATF), Treasury after reviewing the petition submitted by Mr. James Seewald of Vintage Colorado Cellars Winery, on behalf of local vintners and wineries, proposing a viticultural area named "Grand Valley." In 2001, the smaller West Elks AVA, located southeast of Grand Valley, became the state's second designated AVA.

== History ==
The name "Grand Valley" has been associated with the area since the mid-nineteenth century. The present Colorado River above Grand Junction was known as the Grand River as early as 1842. The city of Grand Junction was so named because of its position at the juncture of the Gunnison and Grand Rivers. The confluence of the Green and Grand rivers occurred in eastern Utah and formed the Colorado River. The Grand River was renamed Colorado River by an act of the Colorado State Legislature, approved March 24, 1921, and made official July 25, 1921 in House Joint Resolution 460 of the 66th Congress. In addition to Grand Junction, the name "Grand" still remains in the Grand Valley between Palisade and Mack; in Grand Mesa, which stands more than a mile above the Grand and Gunnison Valleys, and in Grand County, Colorado.

Viticulture began in the area during the late 19th century. Settlers brought vine rootstock to the region, named it Vineland, and had their first crush of grapes flowing by 1885. In 1890, State Governor George A. Crawford planted a 60-acre (24 ha) vineyard in the Grand Valley. By 1900, there were over 1,000 farms growing wine grapes and local sales tax records showed that 1,744 US gallons (6,600 L) of wine were sold that year. However, the thriving wine business diminished in 1909 when Mesa County abolished alcohol and Colorado later enacted a statewide prohibition in 1916. Furthermore, the ratification of the 18th Amendment in 1919 and federal enforcement of Prohibition caused farmers to rip out their grape vines in favor of peaches, now one of the state's most important fruit crops. Palisade is known for its peaches as well as plums, pears, cherries and apples. Although Prohibition was repealed in 1933, the Great Depression sapped farmers of the funds to restart wine production. The development of cold-hardy hybrids sparked a resurgence of winemaking in the 1950s. Colorado's first modern winery was not started until 1968 when a Denver periodontist, Gerald Ivancie, established Ivancie Cellars in the city. In 1977, the General Assembly enacted the Colorado Limited Winery Act, permitting small "farm wineries" in the state. A year later, Colorado Mountain Vineyards opened in Palisade and now operates as Colorado Cellars being the state's oldest operating winery. The Colorado wine industry has been steadily growing especially in Grand Valley.

== Terroir ==
Grand Valley viticultural area includes, within its boundaries, three areas which are locally known by the names of Orchard Mesa, the Redlands, and the Vinelands. Orchard Mesa is a tract of almost flat terrace land south of the Colorado River and to the southeast of Grand Junction. The Redlands is a rolling and somewhat hilly area south of the Colorado River and between the mouth of the Gunnison River and Fruita. The Vinelands is a tract of land located southeast of the town of Palisade. The region is home to some of the highest-altitude vineyards in North America. Vineyards in the valley are planted at elevations as high as 4,700 feet (1,400 m) above sea level. The terrain is varied, ranging from alluvial soils along the Colorado River to stony and loamy soils on mesas. Climate is high desert, subject to swings of temperature and wide diurnal variation of up to 30 °F (17 °C). During a typical growing season, the valley is hot, dry and sunny during the day while far cooler at night due to the arid environment. This makes for ideal fruit-growing conditions. The AVA enjoys the most temperate climate within the state of Colorado, with the USDA plant hardiness zones 6b and 7a.

=== Topography ===
Elevations in the Grand Valley viticultural area rise from 4,500 feet (1,400 m) at the western end near Fruita to 4,573 feet (1,394 m) at Grand Junction, and 4,729 feet (1,441 m) at the eastern end of the Valley near Palisade. Deep canyons flank the Valley to the southwest. A sharp escarpment, Book Cliffs, rises to 7,000 feet (2,100 m) above the Valley to the north and northeast. The Grand Mesa stands more than a mile above the eastern edge of the Valley, and steep, hilly land borders the high terraces and mesas to the south.

=== Climate ===
The climate of the Grand Valley viticultural area is similar to that of most of the intermountain areas west of the Continental Divide in its aridity, wide range of daily temperatures, high percentage of bright sunny days, and high evaporation rate. Where the climate differs, the differences apparently are caused by protective mountain barriers. In the extreme eastern part of the area, the Colorado River enters the Grand Valley through a steep narrow canyon that tends to stabilize air currents in the Valley. During the day, the air tends to move up the slopes that confine the Valley at its eastern end. Then, at night, the air moves down again. This air movement, spoken of as air drainage, affords a more limited daily range in temperature and less danger from frost, particularly at the eastern end of the Grand Valley where the majority of the vinifera plantings are located. Hence, the eastern section of the Valley, to a distance of about 3 or 4 miles (4.8 or 6.4 km) west of Palisade, has a climate particularly suitable for orchard fruits and grapes. Summer temperatures rise to a maximum of about 105 °F (41 °C). Several days in summer may have temperatures above 100 °F (38 °C) with cool nights. The winters are mild with temperatures usually above zero, though an absolute minimum of −21 °F (−29 °C) has been recorded. The average humidity is low, so 0 °F (−18 °C) weather does not seem so cold nor the summers so hot as in regions where the humidity is higher. The average frost-free growing season is 150 to 182 days. Occasionally, late spring or early fall frosts do some damage to fruits and vegetables on the bottom lands and recent flood plains. On the mesas or higher terraces, frost damage is slight. Frost is especially rare in the climatically protected areas around Palisade and along the bluffs bordering the Redlands. High winds are unusual, and cyclones are unknown. Light thundershowers are common during summer. Hail damage is localized and usually slight. Summer showers are frequently more detrimental than beneficial, especially those that come during the harvesting season. The average annual precipitation at Grand Junction is 9.06 inches (230.12 mm). This precipitation is well distributed throughout the year but is not sufficient to permit successful dry fanning. The soils support only a scant growth of native grasses and shrubs if they are not irrigated. The average snowfall is 22 inches (56 cm) but usually melts within a few days after it falls. The ground is free of snow most of the winter.

=== Soil ===
Grand Valley is also distinguishable from surrounding areas by soil differences. In addition to the cliffs and mesas to the north and east of the valley, the surrounding areas to the northwest, west and south contain soils which are usually more alkaline than the soils within the viticultural area. For the most part, these areas are not capable of being irrigated and are suitable only for livestock grazing. It is rocky, often steeply sloped, and the soils are classified from fair to poor, to non-existent. Large areas to the south, along the Gunnison River and Colorado Highway 50, show extensive evidence of excessive salts and alkalinity. The nearest commercial vineyards outside the viticultural area are located in excess of 50 miles (80 km) from the Grand Valley with mountains, mesas, valleys, canyons, and vast areas of salt, sagebrush and alkali separating the two. Grapes within the AVA are adapted to the medium textured to sandy Genola, Hinman, Mayfield, Mesa, Ravola, and Thoroughfare soils, especially where these soils are in areas where peaches are grown, since grapes and peaches tend to do well in the same type of environment. In contrast, soils to the west of the viticultural area are predominantly Billings, Chipeta. Fruita. Mack and Persayo-Chipeta which, for the most part, are not suitable for grape growing.

== Wine industry ==
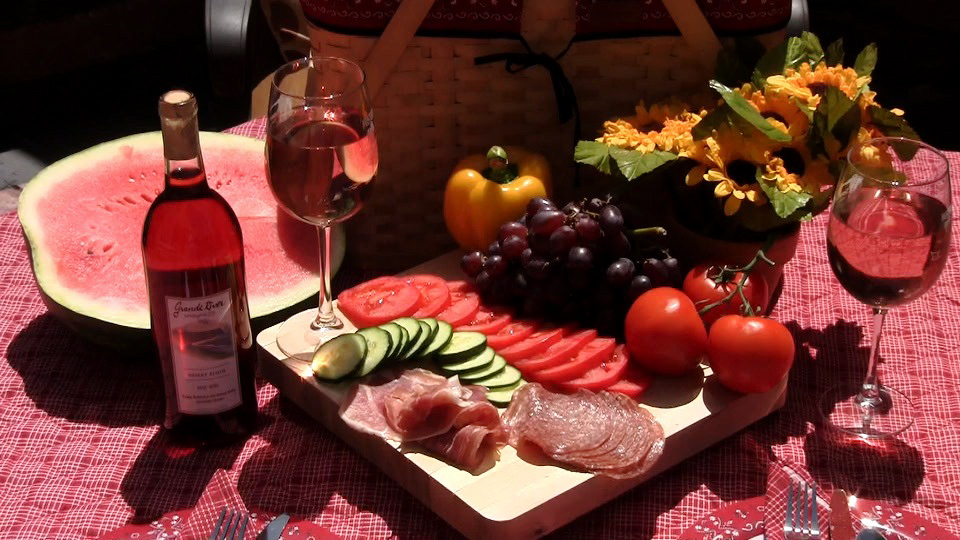

Grand Valley, particularly the eastern area, is unofficially considered 'Colorado Wine Country' and a popular destination for enotourism because of the growing interest in wine tasting and the abundance of natural recreational activities and scenery surrounding the area including Colorado National Monument and the Book Cliffs. Most of Colorado's grape production is from the Grand Valley. However, the continental climate somewhat limits the grape varieties and not all varieties produce substantial yields. There are around thirty wineries/vineyards in addition to an abundance of cideries, meaderies and orchards. Grape varieties planted vary widely and average yields are relatively low at about 2.5 short tons (2 t) per acre. Wine styles range from dry white and red wines to semi-sweet, dessert wines; and even ice wine. Due to the abundance of orchards in the area many growers will incorporate local fruits, such as peaches, plums and cherries, into the sweet wines. However, traditional Cabernet Sauvignon, Merlot, Chardonnay and Syrah are the most popular and easily grown fruit in this dry, high-altitude terroir. In 2018, Grand Valley AVA received international acclaim as one of the "Top Ten Wine Getaways" by Wine Enthusiast Magazine. Palisade hosts its annual Colorado Mountain Winefest which was named the 'Best Wine Fest in the Nation' by USA Today's "10Best" in 2017. Over 6,000 attended the sold-out event which exhibits several hundred local wines, meads & ciders from dozens of Colorado wineries, meaderies and cideries.
