= Colorado wine =

Wine made from grapes grown in Colorado, USA

Colorado
- Wine region
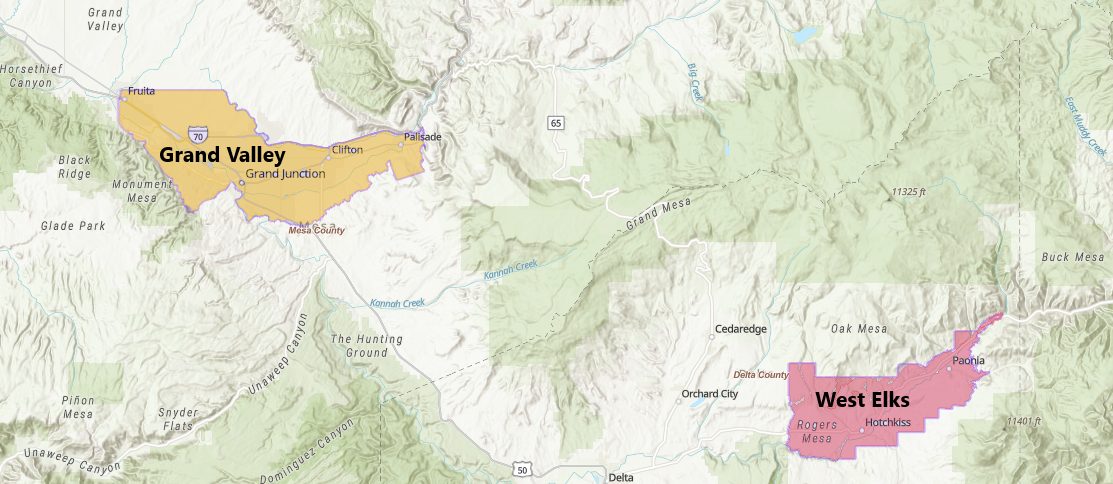
- Official name: State of Colorado
- Type: U.S. State Appellation
- Years of wine industry: 136
- Country: United States
- Sub-regions: Grand Valley AVA, West Elks AVA
- Climate region: Continental
- Total area: 104,185 square miles (66,678,400 acres)
- Size of planted vineyards: 1,000 acres (405 ha)
- Grapes produced: Cabernet Franc, Cabernet Sauvignon, Chambourcin, Chardonel, Chardonnay, Cinsault, Gewurztraminer, Lemberger, Marechal Foch, Merlot, Muscat Canelli, Orange Muscat, Petit Verdot, Pinot gris, Pinot noir, Riesling, Sangiovese, Sauvignon blanc, Semillon, Seyval blanc, Syrah, Viognier, Zinfandel
- No. of wineries: approx 165
- Wine produced: 206,000 cases in 2022

Colorado wine refers to wine made from grapes grown in the U.S. state of Colorado. State names in the United States automatically qualify as legal appellations of origin for wine produced from grapes grown in that state and do not require registration with the Alcohol and Tobacco Tax and Trade Bureau (TTB) of the Treasury Department. TTB was created in January 2003, when the Bureau of Alcohol, Tobacco and Firearms, or ATF, was extensively reorganized under the provisions of the Homeland Security Act of 2002.
Most of Colorado's vineyards are located on the western slope of the Rocky Mountains, though an increasing number of wineries are located along the Front Range.

== Geography and climate ==
Colorado's grape-growing regions contain some of the highest elevation vineyards in the world, with most viticulture in the state practiced between 4,000 feet (1,219 m) and 7,000 feet (2,134 m) above sea level. The mountain climate ensures warm summer days and cool nights. Colorado is home to two designated American Viticultural Areas where most of the state's vineyards are located: the Grand Valley AVA and the West Elks AVA. Approximately 150 commercial wineries operate in Colorado, and about 1,000 acres (405 ha) are planted with grapevines. Other wine regions include: the Four Corners area near Cortez, near Canyons of the Ancients National Monument, and Durango; Pikes Peak/Arkansas River Valley near Salida, Cañon City, and Manitou Springs; and the Front Range between Fort Collins and Castle Rock, with some wineries located in the Denver metropolitan area.

== History ==
Grapevines were first brought to Colorado in the 19th century by miners in southern Colorado. The first agricultural record of vineyards was when George A. Crawford, founder of Grand Junction planted 60 acres (24 ha) of grapes and other fruit near Palisade. Homegrown wine was once a part of life in Colorado as it was throughout America. Like in other areas Prohibition in the United States virtually wiped out the Colorado wine industry in the early twentieth century only to have it resurrected again in the 1960s. In the 1930s, Carbone & Co. and Ambrose & Co. opened as the first licensed wineries in Colorado post-prohibition. Neither made wine from Colorado grapes, but bottled bulk wine from out of state. Ambrose closed in the 1950s and Carbone changed names several times and eventually closed in the 1970s. In 1968, Gerald Ivancie opened Ivancie Cellars in Denver using grapes from California, but was instrumental in working with fruit growers to develop experimental plantings of premium wine grapes in and around the Grand Valley. Ivancie's winemaker was Warren Winiarski, who was the first winemaker at Robert Mondavi Winery and rose to fame when his Stag's Leap Wine Cellars '73 S.L.V Cabernet Sauvignon vintage ranked #1 in the historic 1976 Judgement of Paris wine tasting. Ivancie sold his winery in 1973 and then it closed a few years later. Ivancie Cellar's license was still listed in the 1978 Federal Register but operations ceased sometime before that. In 1976, Franciscan Winery from California (owned by Justin Meyer) became bonded winery number 4 when it opened a tasting room in Denver before closing a year later.

Colorado's Limited Farm Winery Act was passed in 1977. A decade later, Colorado was one of the first states to respond to California's offer to establish free trade among wineries and consumers through the Reciprocal Shipping Law, helping the re-emerging Colorado grape growing and winemaking industry. This legislation spurred local home winemakers, Jim and Anne Seewald, who worked with Dr. Ivancie to open Colorado Mountain Vineyards; the first licensed Colorado winery to use Colorado grapes.

In 1990, with five operating wineries, the Colorado General Assembly created the Colorado Wine Industry Development Board (CWIDB). The next year, Grand Valley, near Palisade, was recognized by the Bureau of Alcohol, Tobacco and Firearms (ATF) as the state's initial American Viticultural Area (AVA). In 2001, the West Elks was established as the state's second AVA. In 2010, there were approximately 115 commercial wineries in Colorado. As of 2024, there were approximately 180 wineries - including 21 hard cider producers, 14 mead producers and one sake producer.

In 2021, Warren Winiarski invested in the Colorado wine and grape industry through a $150,000 grant from the Winiarski Family Foundation, the charitable foundation established by Winiarski and his wife, Barbara. The grant benefits the Western Colorado Community College Viticulture and Enology program.

== Governor's Cup Competition ==
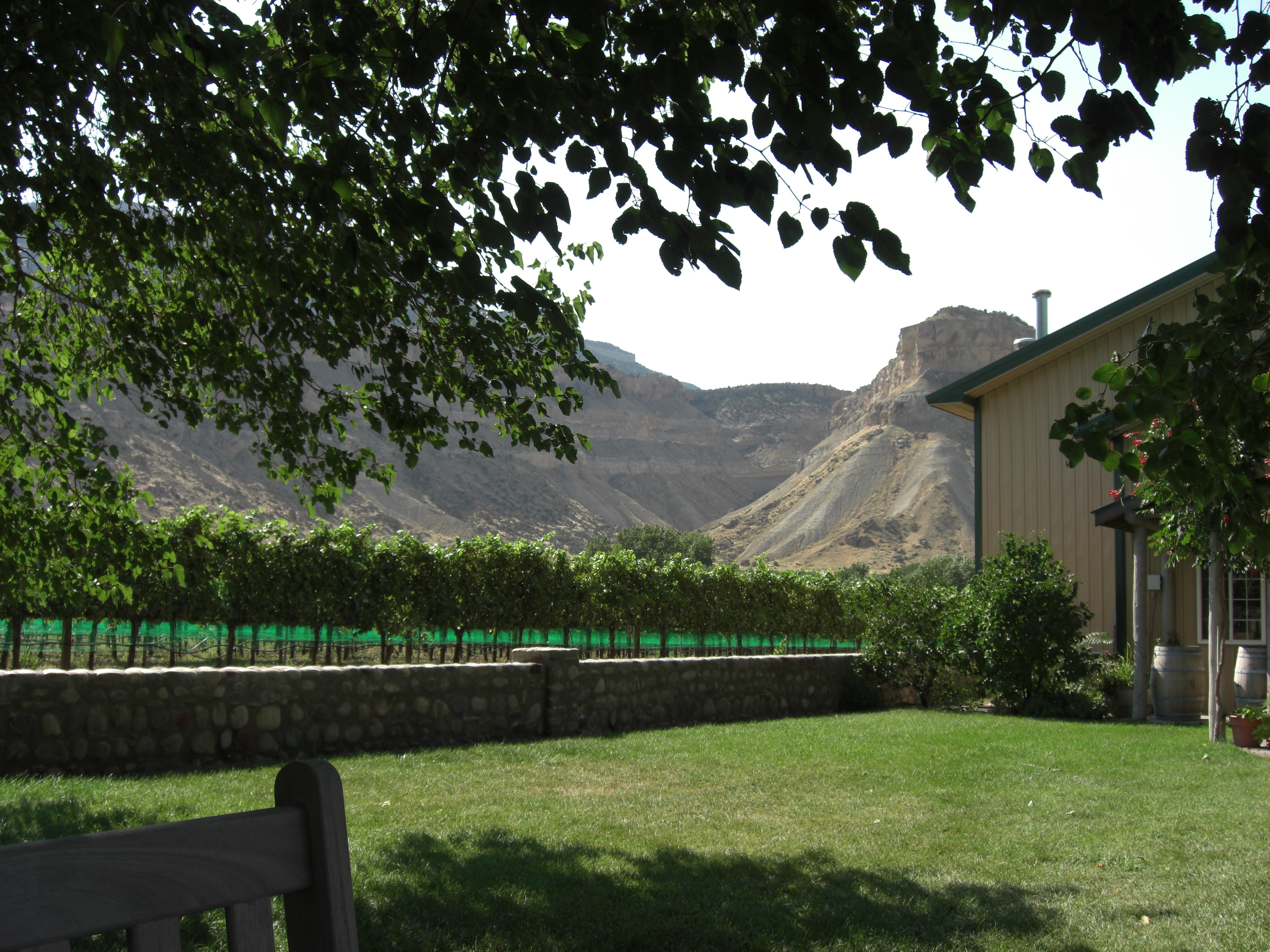
Vineyard in western Colorado

Every year, the Colorado Wine Industry Development Board hosts the Governor's Cup Competition; which is the only competition exclusively for Colorado wineries. Each year, the CWIDB invites licensed Colorado wineries to submit samples for evaluation by a panel of esteemed wine professionals from around the United States. The top wines from the competition comprise the Governor's Cup Collection which is used to showcase the industry to the public and the wine industry. The winners are honored at public event called Colorado Uncorked and the Best of Show is announced at the event.

Best of Show winners:

- 2010 - (TIED) Best Red: Alfred Eames Cellars (Paonia) 2009 Sangre del Sol
  Best White: Boulder Creek Winery (Boulder) 2009 "Gen Y" Riesling
- 2011 - (TIED) Best Red: Cottonwood Cellars (Olathe) 2005 Classic Blend Estate Red
  Best White: Whitewater Hill Vineyards (Grand Junction) 2009 Riesling
- 2012 - The Winery at Holy Cross Abbey (Cañon City) 2009 Cabernet Franc Reserve
- 2013 - Creekside Cellars (Evergreen) 2010 Cabernet Franc
- 2014 - Canyon Wind Cellars (Palisade) 2012 Petit Verdot
- 2015 - (TIED) Canyon Wind Cellars (Palisade) 2013 "Anemoi Lips" Syrah
  Turquoise Mesa Winery (Broomfield) 2013 Syrah
- 2016 - Bookcliff Vineyards (Boulder) 2013 "Ensemble" Red Blend
- 2017 - Creekside Cellars (Evergreen) 2014 Cabernet Franc
- 2018 - Bookcliff Vineyards (Boulder) 2015 Cabernet Franc Reserve
- 2019 - Qutori Wines (Paonia) 2016 Syrah
- 2020 - No Competition
- 2021 - Carboy Winery (Littleton) 2019 Teroldego
- 2022 - Carboy Winery (Littleton) 2020 Teroldego
- 2023 - Alfred Eames Cellars (Paonia) 2019 Carmena
- 2024 - The OBC Wine Project (Fort Collins) 2023 Colorado Red Blend
- 2025 - Sauvage Spectrum Estate Winery & Vineyard (Palisade, Grand Valley AVA) 2024 Zweigelt
- 2026 - The Storm Cellar (Hotchkiss, West Elks AVA) 2024 Reserve Riesling

== Grapes ==
The most popular grapes grown in Colorado are varieties in the species of European grape Vitis vinifera. The most popular red varieties are Merlot, Cabernet Sauvignon, Syrah, and Cabernet Franc. The most popular white varieties are Chardonnay, Riesling, and Viognier. Cold-hardy varieties such as Chambourcin, Verona, La Crescent, Traminette, and Petite Pearl are becoming more popular as growers look to diversify vineyard acreage that can withstand the sometimes harsh cold events that damage, or kill, grapevines in Colorado.

== Recognition ==
Several Colorado wineries have been awarded scores of 90 points or above by Decanter, Wine Enthusiast, and The Wine Advocate.

In 2017, Colorado Mountain Winefest in Palisade was voted the nation's best wine festival by USA Today's "10Best."

Also in 2017, Kyle Schlachter, outreach coordinator for the Colorado Wine Industry Development Board, was named one of Wine Enthusiast's "40 Under 40 Tastemakers" because his efforts reflect the diversity and uniqueness of wine in the U.S.

In 2018, Wine Enthusiast named Grand Valley one of the top ten wine travel destinations in the world.

The New York Times named Grand Junction as one of the 52 Places to Travel in 2023.

In 2024, the Grand Valley came in 10th in the USA Today's 10 Best Readers’ Choice Top 10 Wine Regions.

In 2025, Travel & Leisure named Colorado wine country as a top place to go in the U.S.

In 2026, the West Elks AVA came in 2nd in the USA Today's 10Best Readers' Choice Top 10 Wine Regions.

== See also ==
- American wine
- Grand Valley AVA
- West Elks AVA
