= Grand Valley (Colorado–Utah) =

Valley in Colorado and Utah, United States of America

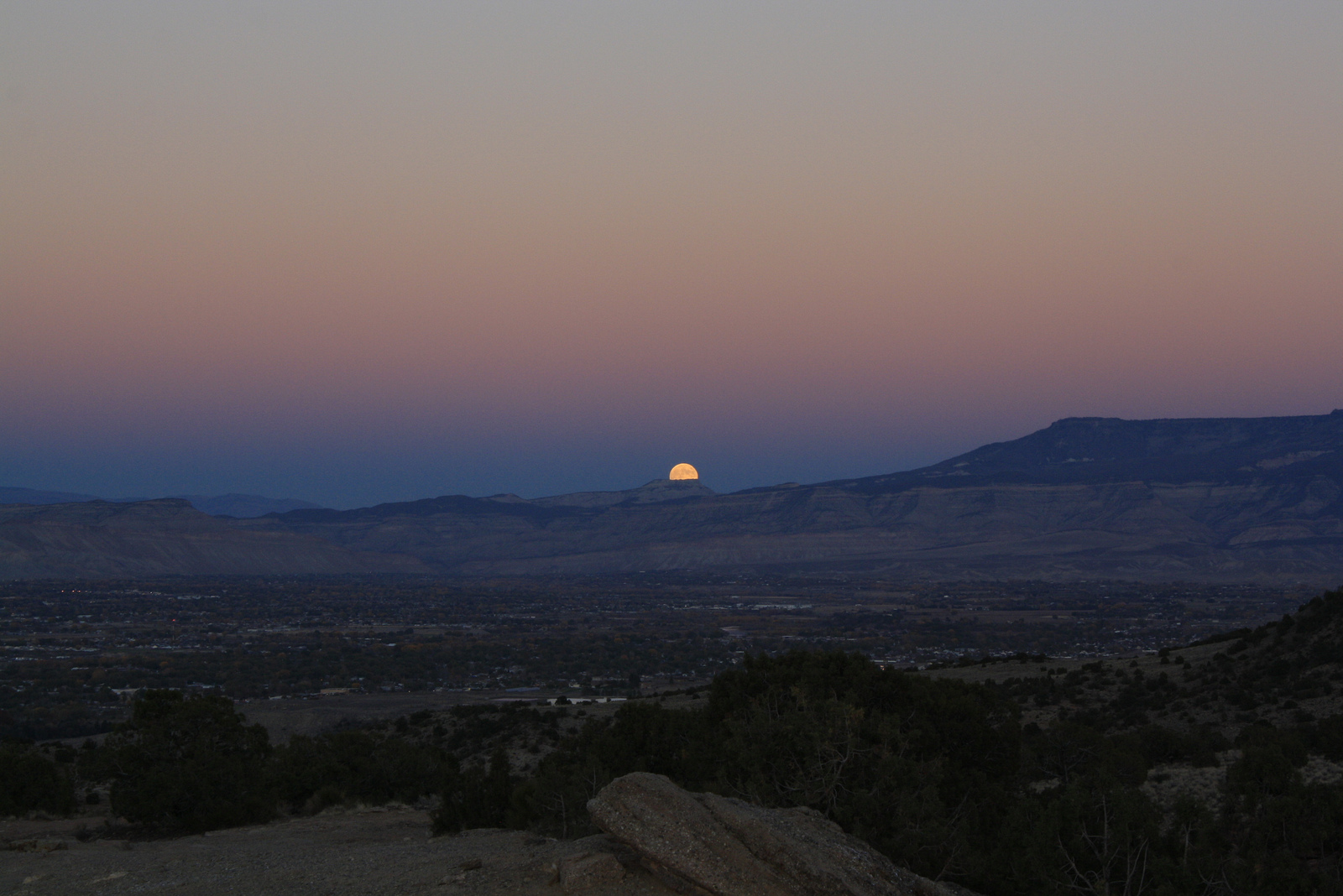
- A portion of the Grand Valley at dusk, November 2013

- Location within Colorado Location within the United States

Geography
- Country: United States
- States: Colorado; Utah
- County: Mesa County, CO; Grand County, UT
- Coordinates: 39°11′N 108°43′W
- Interactive map of Grand Valley

The Grand Valley is an extended populated valley, approximately 30 miles (48 km) long and 5 miles (8.0 km) wide, located along the Colorado River in Mesa County (and slightly into Garfield County) in western Colorado and Grand County in eastern Utah in the Western United States. The valley contains the city of Grand Junction, as well as other smaller communities such as Fruita and Palisade. The valley is a major fruit-growing region that contains many orchards and vineyards, and is home to one of two designated American Viticultural Areas in Colorado: the Grand Valley AVA. It takes its name from the "Grand River", the historical name of the Colorado River from its confluence with the Gunnison River that was used by locals in the late 19th and early 20th century. The valley is the most densely populated area on the Colorado Western Slope, with Grand Junction serving as an unofficial capital of the region, as a counterpoint to Denver on the eastern slope of the Rocky Mountains in the Colorado Front Range. Interstate 70 and U.S. Highway 6 run through the valley from west-to-east. The Grand Valley is part of the larger Colorado Plateau desert lands.

== Description ==
Grand Valley begins where the Colorado River widens at the mouth of De Beque Canyon to the east of Palisade, then follows a wide arc bending to the west. The Colorado receives the Gunnison River, one of its major tributaries, just south of Grand Junction near the midpoint of the valley. The valley is surrounded by large plateau formations, including the Book Cliffs along the north side, the Grand Mesa along the southeast side, and the Uncompahgre Plateau to the southwest. Colorado National Monument sits on a ridge on the southwest side of the valley west of Grand Junction. Much of the surrounding table land areas rimming the valley are public lands controlled by the Bureau of Land Management.

== History ==
The name "Grand Valley" has been associated with the area since the mid-nineteenth century. The present Colorado River above Grand Junction was known as the Grand River as early as 1842. The city of Grand Junction was so named because of its position at the junction of the Gunnison and Grand Rivers. The Green and Grand Rivers united in eastern Utah to become the Colorado River. The Grand River was renamed Colorado River by act of the Colorado State Legislature, approved March 24, 1921, and made official July 25, 1921 in House Joint Resolution 460 of the 66th Congress. In addition to Grand Junction, the name "Grand" still remains in the Grand Valley between Palisade and Mack; in Grand Mesa, which stands more than a mile above the Grand and Gunnison Valleys and in Grand County, Colorado.

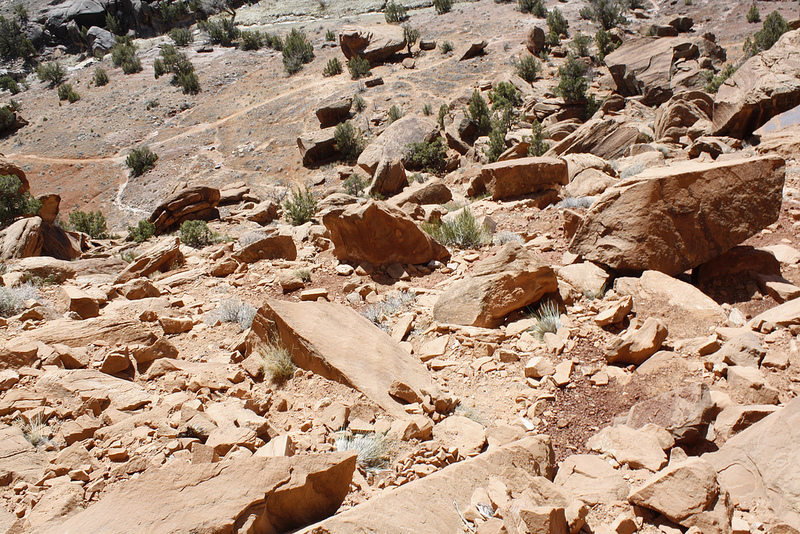
Sandstone rocks and formations are common on the Colorado Plateau desert lands, November 2013

The valley was an area historically occupied by the Ute people (Parianuche band). Settlers began to arrive in the 1880s, farming the valley for a variety of grains and fruits. In the 1890s, it was discovered that sugar beets were found to have a high sugar content and they became a major crop along with other fruits, grains and vegetables. Also in 1890, State Governor George A. Crawford planted a 60 acres (24 ha) wine vineyard in the Grand Valley. By 1900, there were over 1,000 farms in the Grand Valley growing wine grapes and local sales tax records showed that 1,744 gallons of wine were sold that year. At the turn of the 20th century, evaporation techniques allowed fruit-growers to ship their products more efficiently to distant markets, yielding an expansion of fruit growing in the valley.In 1918, the Government Highline Canal was completed to provide water to cultivate 50,000 acres (20.0 km²) in the valley. The project included a roller dam in De Beque Canyon, the largest of three such dams of this type in the nation.

== See also ==
- List of valleys of Utah
- Grand Valley AVA
- Plateau Valley
