= Area of Critical Environmental Concern =

United States conservation ecology program

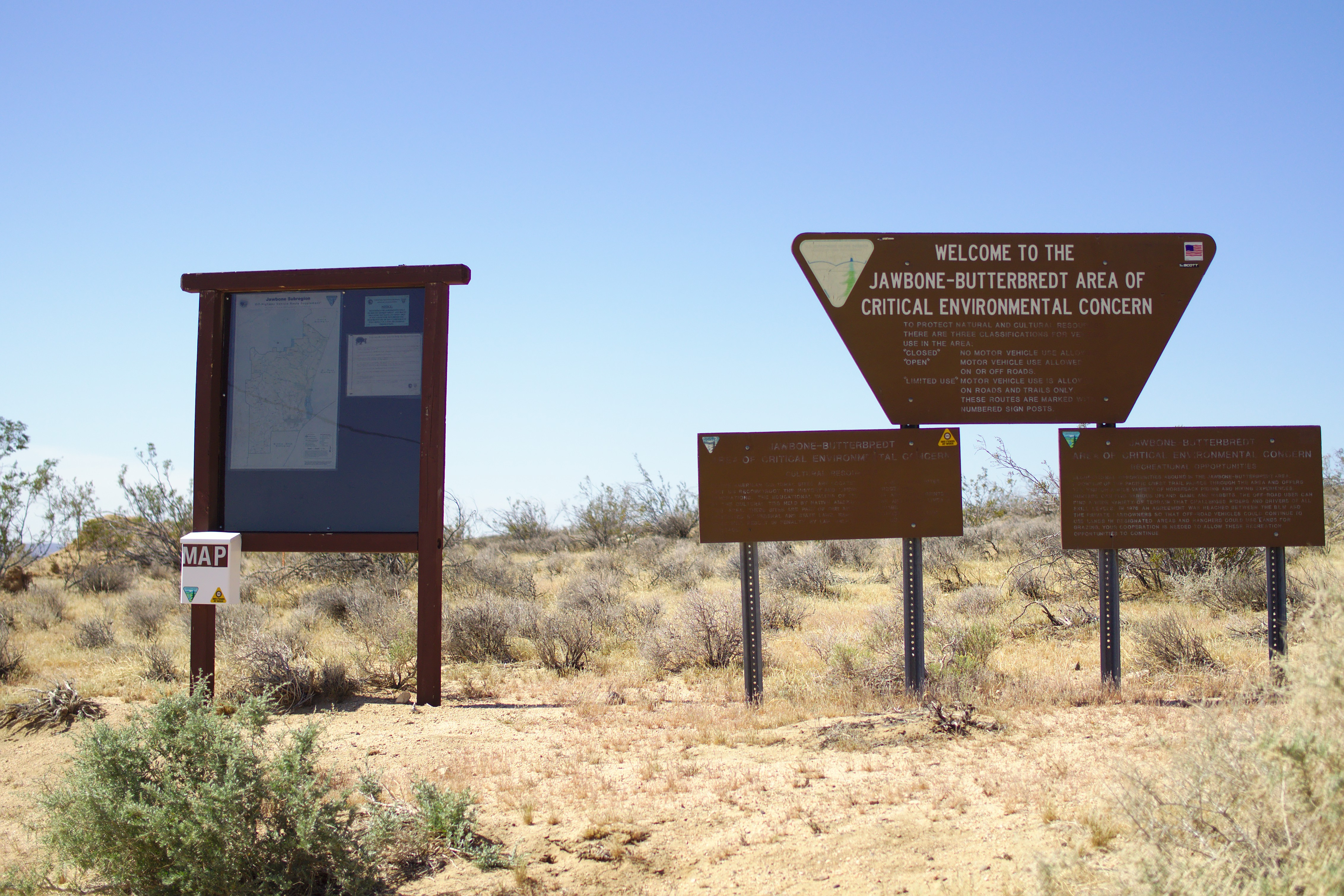
Faded signage for the Jawbone-Butterbredt ACEC in the Mojave Desert

Areas of Critical Environmental Concern (ACEC) is a conservation ecology program in the Western United States, managed by the Bureau of Land Management (BLM). The ACEC program was conceived in the 1976 Federal Lands Policy and Management Act (FLPMA), which established the first conservation ecology mandate for the BLM. The FLPMA mandate directs the BLM to protect important riparian corridors, threatened and endangered species habitats, cultural and archeological resources, as well as unique scenic landscapes that the agency assesses as in need of special management attention.

== Criteria ==
To be considered a potential ACEC an area must meet criteria of both relevance and importance.

=== Relevance ===
An area meets the relevance criteria of an ACEC if it contains one or more of the following:

- A significant historic, cultural, or scenic value;
- A fish or wildlife resource;
- A natural process or system (including but not limited to areas supporting rare, endemic, relict, or endangered plant species, or rare geological features);
- Natural hazards (most notably areas of avalanche, unstable soils, rockfall).

=== Importance ===
An area meets the importance criteria if it is characterized by one or more of the following:

- Has more than locally significant qualities;
- Has qualities or circumstances that make it fragile, sensitive, irreplaceable, rare, unique;
- Has been recognized as warranting protection to satisfy national priority concerns or to carry out the mandates of the Federal Land Policy and Management Act;
- Has qualities which warrant concern about safety and public welfare;
- Poses a significant threat to human life and safety, or to property.

== Designated ACECs ==
=== Alaska ===
- Sukakpak Mountain (2944 acres)

=== Arizona ===
- Witch Pool (279 acres)
- Nampaweap (535 acres)
- Pakoon (76,014 acres)
- Beaver Dam Slope (51,197 acres)
- Virgin River Corridor (8,075 acres)
- Virgin Slope (39,931 acres)
- Little Black Mountain (241 acres)
- Fort Pearce (916 acres)
- Marble Canyon (11,012 acres)
- Johnson Springs (2,464 acres)
- Lost Spring Mountain (8,262 acres)
- Moonshine Ridge (5,095 acres)
- Dripping Springs
- Sears Point

=== California ===
- Afton Canyon
- Big Marias
- Bodie Bowl
- Carrizo Plain
- Clear Creek Serpentine
- Conway Summit
- East Mesa
- Fort Ord
- Indian Pass
- Jawbone-Butterbredt Area of Critical Environmental Concern
- Joaquin Rocks
- Lake Cahuilla Shoreline
- North Algodones Dunes
- Ocotillo
- Pilot Knob
- Plank Road
- The Red Hills of Tuolumne County
- Salton Sea Hazardous
- San Sebastian Marsh/San Felipe Creek
- Serpentine
- Singer Geoglyphs
- West Mesa
- Yuha Basin

=== Colorado ===
The location of the State of Colorado in the United States of America.

- Adobe Badlands – 6,783 acres (27.45 km^{2})
- American Basin – 1,595 acres (6.45 km^{2})
- Anasazi Culture – 156,000 acres (631 km^{2})
- Arkansas Canyonlands – 23,921 acres (96.80 km^{2})
- Atwell Gulch – 2,900 acres (11.74 km^{2})
- Badger Wash – 1,520 acres (6.15 km^{2})
- Barger Gulch Heritage Area – 535 acres (2.17 km^{2})
- Beaver Creek – 12,081 acres (48.89 km^{2})
- Black's Gulch – 800 acres (3.24 km^{2})
- Blanca Wildlife Habitat Area – 8,600 acres (34.8 km^{2})
- Blue Hill – 4,178 acres (16.91 km^{2})
- Browns Canyon – 11,697 acres (47.34 km^{2})
- Bull Gulch – 10,214 acres (41.33 km^{2})
- Coal Draw – 1,840 acres (7.45 km^{2})
- Coal Oil Rim – 3,210 acres (12.99 km^{2})
- Cucharas Canyon – 1,866 acres (7.55 km^{2})
- Cumbres and Toltec Railroad – 3,824 acres (15.48 km^{2})
- Debris Hazard – 7,126 acres (28.84 km^{2})
- Deep Creek – 2,470 acres (10.00 km^{2})
- Deer Gulch – 1,810 acres (7.32 km^{2})
- Dillon Pinnacles – 532 acres (2.15 km^{2})
- Droney Gulch – 705 acres (2.85 km^{2})
- Duck Creek – 3,430 acres (13.88 km^{2})
- Dudley Bluffs – 1,630 acres (6.60 km^{2})
- East Douglas Creek – 47,610 acres (192.67 km^{2})
- Elephant Rocks – 1,338 acres (5.41 km^{2})
- Escalante Canyon – 1,895 acres (7.67 km^{2})
- Fairview – 377 acres (1.53 km^{2})
- Garden Park National Natural Landmark – 2,728 acres (11.04 km^{2})
- Glenwood Springs Debris Flow Hazard Zones – 6,100 acres (24.69 km^{2})
- Grand Hogback – 4,300 acres (17.40 km^{2})
- Grape Creek – 15,978 acres (64.66 km^{2})
- Gunnison Gravels – 5 acres (0.02 km^{2})
- Gunnison Sage Grouse – 22,000 acres (89.03 km^{2})
- Gypsum Valley – 13,135 acres (53.16 km^{2})
- Hardscrabble-East Eagle – 4,200 acres (17.00 km^{2})
- Indian Creek – 2,300 acres (9.31 km^{2})
- Irish Canyon – 11,680 acres (47.27 km^{2})
- Juanita Arch – 1,600 acres (6.47 km^{2})
- Kremmling – 674 acres (2.73 km^{2})
- Kremling Ammonite Site Research Natural Area – 160 acres (0.65 km^{2})
- Laramie River – 1,783 acres (7.22 km^{2})
- Los Mogotes – 33,456 acres (135.39 km^{2})
- Lower Colorado River – 9,000 acres (36 km^{2})
- Lower Greasewood Creek – 210 acres (0.85 km^{2})
- Lyons Gulch – 400 acres (1.62 km^{2})
- McCoy Fan Delta – 1,500 acres (6.07 km^{2})
- McElmo Rare Lizard and Snake – 427 acres (1.73 km^{2})
- Moosehead Mountain – 8,940 acres (36.18 km^{2})
- Mosquito Pass – 4,036 acres (16.33 km^{2})
- Mount Logan Foothills – 4,000 acres (16.19 km^{2})
- Mt. Garfield – 2,400 acres (9.71 km^{2})
- Native Plant Community – 4,577 acres (18.52 km^{2})
- Needle Rock – 80 acres (0.32 km^{2})
- North Park Natural Area – 4,444 acres (17.98 km^{2})
- North Park Phaceila – 300 acres (1.21 km^{2})
- North Sand Hills – 486 acres (1.97 km^{2})
- Oil Spring Mountain – 18,260 acres (73.90 km^{2})
- Phantom Canyon – 6,096 acres (24.67 km^{2})
- Pyramid Rock – 470 acres (1.90 km^{2})
- Rajadero Canyon – 3,632 acres (14.70 km^{2})
- Raven Ridge – 4,980 acres (20.15 km^{2})
- Red Cloud Peak – 5,947 acres (24.07 km^{2})
- Rio Grande – 2,830 acres (11.45 km^{2})
- Roan and Carr Creeks – 33,600 acres (135.97 km^{2})
- Rough Canyon – 1,470 acres (5.95 km^{2})
- Ryan Gulch – 1,440 acres (5.83 km^{2})
- San Luis Hills/Flattop – 29,261 acres (118.42 km^{2})
- San Miguel River – 20,964 acres (84.84 km^{2})
- Sheep Creek Uplands – 3,900 acres (15.78 km^{2})
- Sinbad Valley – 6,400 acres (25.90 km^{2})
- Slumgullion National Natural Landmark – 1,407 acres (5.69 km^{2})
- South Beaver Creek – 4,565 acres (18.47 km^{2})
- South Cathedral Bluffs – 1,330 acres (5.38 km^{2})
- South Shale Ridge – 27,800 acres (112.50 km^{2})
- The Palisade – 19,178 acres (77.61 km^{2})
- Thompson Creek – 4,286 acres (17.34 km^{2})
- Trickle Mountain – 44,521 acres (180.17 km^{2})
- Troublesome Creek – 998 acres (4.04 km^{2})
- Unaweep Seep Research Natural Area – 37 acres (0.15 km^{2})
- West Antelope Creek – 28,215 acres (114.18 km^{2})
- White River Riparian – 950 acres (3.84 km^{2})
- Yanks Gulch/Upper Greasewood Creek – 2,680 acres (10.85 km^{2})

=== Idaho ===
- Menan Buttes
- Long-billed Curlew Habitat

=== Montana ===
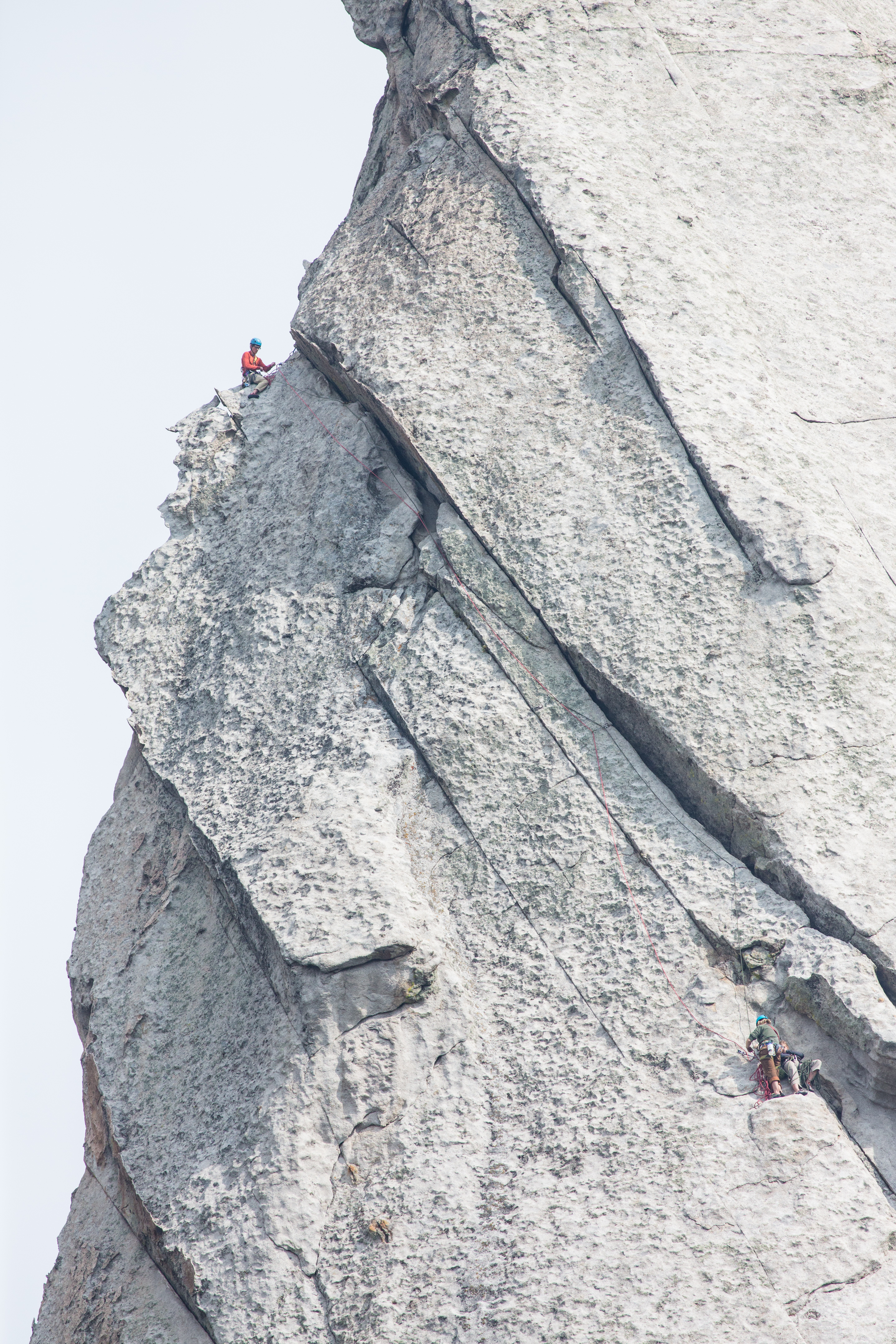
Climbers in Humbug Spires WSA

(For more detailed descriptions of the following sites see)

- Acid Shale-Pine Forest (endemic plant community, 2,463 acres (9.97 km^{2}), Lewistown Office)
- Ash Creek Divide (paleo, 7,931 acres (32.10 km^{2}), Miles City Office)
- Azure Cave (cave resources, bats; 140 acres (0.57 km^{2}), Malta Office)
- Battle Butte (cultural, 120 acres (0.49 km^{2}), Miles City)
- Bear Creek Flats (wildlife, oldgrowth pine, recreation, 564 acres (2.28 km^{2}), Missoula Office)
- Beaverhead Rock (historic petroglyphs, 120 acres (0.49 km^{2}), Dillon Office)
- Big Bend of the Milk River (archaeological resources 2,120 acres (8.6 km^{2}), Malta)
- Big Sheep Mountain (cultural, 360 acres (1.5 km^{2}), Miles City)
- Bitter Creek (vegetation, landscape; 59,600 acres (241 km^{2}), Malta)
- Black-footed ferret (wildlife, 11,166 acres (45.19 km^{2}), Miles City)
- Blue Lake (home to axoloti, rare form of tiger salamander; 430 acres (1.7 km^{2}), Dillon)
- Block Mountain (geological education, 8,661 acres (35.05 km^{2}), Dillon)
- Bridger Fossil (paleo, 575 acres (2.33 km^{2}), Billings Office)
- Bug Creek (paleo, 3,840 acres (15.5 km^{2}), Miles City)
- Castle Butte (cultural, 185 acres (0.75 km^{2}), Billings)
- Centennial Mountains (wildlife migration route, rare plants, grizzly bear, lynx, & wolf; 40,715 acres (164.77 km^{2}), Dillon)
- Centennial Sandhills (sand dunes, sensitive plants; 1,040 acres (4.2 km^{2}), Dillon)
- Collar Gulch (cutthroat trout, 1,618 acres (6.55 km^{2}), Lewistown)
- Cow Creek (geological, scenic; 14,000 acres (57 km^{2}), Lewistown)
- East Pryor Mountains (wildlife, wild horses, paleo; 29,500 acres (119 km^{2}), Billings)
- Elkhorn Mountains (historic & cultural sites, wildlife; 50,431 acres (204.09 km^{2}), Butte Office)
- Everson Creek (Stone Age archaeological site, 8,608 acres (34.84 km^{2}), Dillon)
- Finger Buttes (scenic, 1,520 acres (6.2 km^{2}), Miles City)
- Four Dances (cultural, scenic, peregrine falcon habitat; 765 acres (3.10 km^{2}), Billings)
- Hell Creek (paleo, 19,169 acres (77.57 km^{2}), Miles City)
- Hoe (cultural, 144 acres (0.58 km^{2}), Miles City)
- Howrey Island (wildlife, 321 acres (1.30 km^{2}), Miles City)
- Humbug Spires (scenic, wildlife, vegetation; 8,374 acres (33.89 km^{2}), Butte)
- Judith Mountains Scenic Area (scenic, wildlife, recreation; 3,702 acres (14.98 km^{2}), Lewistown)
- Jordan Bison Kill (cultural, 160 acres (0.65 km^{2}), Miles City Office)
- Kevin Rim (wildlife, cultural, recreation; 4,657 acres (18.85 km^{2}), Great Falls Office)
- Meeteetse Spires (rare plants, scenery; 960 acres (3.9 km^{2}), Billings)
- Mountain Plover (wildlife, vegetation; 24,730 acres (100.1 km^{2}), Malta)
- Muddy Creek/Big Sheep Creek (scenic, cultural; 13,097 acres (53.00 km^{2}), Dillon)
- Petroglyph Canyon (cultural, 240 acres (0.97 km^{2}), Billings)
- Piping Plover (wildlife, 16 acres (0.065 km^{2}), Miles City)
- Pompeys Pillar (historic, cultural, recreation; 470 acres (1.9 km^{2}), Billings)
- Powder River Depot (cultural, 1,386 acres (5.61 km^{2}), Miles City)
- Prairie Dog Towns, (black-footed ferret reintroduction site, 12,346 acres (49.96 km^{2}), Malta)
- Rattler Gulch Limestone Cliffs (scenic, 20 acres (0.081 km^{2}), Missoula office. See Garnet Range for description)
- Reynolds Battlefield (cultural, 336 acres (1.36 km^{2}), Miles City)
- Ringing Rocks (unique geology, 160 acres (0.65 km^{2}), Butte Office)
- Sand Arroyo (paleo, 9,056 acres (36.65 km^{2}), Miles City)
- Seline (cultural, 80 acres (0.32 km^{2}), Miles City)
- Sleeping Giant (recreation, wildlife, scenic; 11,679 acres (47.26 km^{2}), Butte Office)
- Smoky Butte (geology, recreation; 80 acres (0.32 km^{2}), Miles City)
- Square Butte (cultural, scenic, geologic; 1,947 acres (7.88 km^{2}), Lewistown)
- Squaw Rock (wildlife, scenic, recreation; 640 acres (2.6 km^{2}), Missoula)
- Sweetgrass Hills (Cultural, wildlife, recreation; 7,952 acres (32.18 km^{2}), Great Falls)
- Stark Site (cultural, 800 acres (3.2 km^{2}), Billings)
- Virginia City, Montana Historic District (historic, 513 acres (2.08 km^{2}), Dillon)
- Weatherman Draw (cultural, 4,268 acres (17.27 km^{2}), Billings)

=== Nevada ===
- Ash Meadows
- Beaver Dam Slope
- Condor Canyon
- Ivanpah
- Mormon Mesa
- Piute/Eldorado
- Rainbow Gardens
- River Mountains

=== New Mexico ===
- Sombrillo
- La Cienega
- Simon Canyon
- Florida Mountains
- Sacramento Escarpment
- Three Rivers Petroglyph
- Alamo Hueco Mountains
- Bear Creek
- Blue Spring
- Pecos River Canyon Complex
- Big Hatchet Mountains
- Cowboy Spring
- Granite Gap
- Guadalupe Canyon
- Chosa Draw
- Cookes Range
- Gila Lower Box
- Gila Middle Box
- Alkali Lakes
- Apache Box
- Central Peloncillo Mountains
- Uvas Valley
- Black Grama
- Cornudas Mountain
- Wind Mountain
- Alamo Mountain

=== Oregon ===
- Wassen Creek (Natural systems and botanical values, 3,397 acres (13.75 km^{2}), Coos Bay Office)
- North Spit (Botanical, wildlife, and cultural values, 710 acres (2.9 km^{2}), Coos Bay Office)
- North Fork Coquille River (Natural systems; botanical fish values, 311 acres (1.26 km^{2}), Coos Bay Office)
- Tioga Creek (Natural systems, 42 acres (0.17 km^{2}), Coos Bay Office)
- Cherry Creek (Natural systems and botanical values, 592 acres (2.40 km^{2}), Coos Bay Office)
- China Wall (Natural systems; botanical and cultural values, 303 acres (1.23 km^{2}), Coos Bay Office)
- Upper Rock Creek (Natural systems and botanical values, 472 acres (1.91 km^{2}), Coos Bay Office)
- New River (Botanical, wildlife, fish and cultural values, 1,135 acres (4.59 km^{2}), Coos Bay Office)
- North Fork Hunter Creek (Natural systems; botanical and cultural values, 1,925 acres (7.79 km^{2}), Coos Bay Office)
- Hunter Creek Bog (Natural systems and botanical values, 721 acres (2.92 km^{2}), Coos Bay Office)
- North Fork Chetco River (Natural systems; and botanical, fish, and cultural values 603 acres (2.44 km^{2}), Coos Bay Office)
- Upper and Lower Table Rock

=== Utah ===
- Copper Globe (historic, 128 acres (0.52 km^{2}), Vernal office)
- Dark Canyon (59,755 acres, Monticello office)
- I-70 Scenic ACEC (scenic, 45,463 acres (183.98 km^{2}), Price office)
- Lears Canyon (habitat, 1,378 acres (5.58 km^{2}), Vernal office)
- Lower Green River (scenic, habitat, 9,430 acres (38.2 km^{2}), Vernal office)
- Nine Mile Canyon (scenic, cultural, 48,151 acres (194.86 km^{2}), Vernal office)
- Pariette Wetlands (habitat, 10,635 acres (43.04 km^{2}), Vernal office)
- San Rafael Canyon (scenic, 54,102 acres (218.94 km^{2}), Price office)
- San Rafael Reef (scenic, 84,018 acres (340.01 km^{2}), Price office)
- Scenic Highway Corridor (scenic, 13,554 acres (54.85 km^{2}), Monticello office)
- Sid's Mountain (scenic, 61,380 acres (248.4 km^{2}), Price office)
- Temple Mountain (historic, 2,444 acres (9.89 km^{2}), Price office)
- Bonneville Salt Flats ((convert30,203))

=== Wyoming ===
- Greater Red Creek (175240 acres)
- Greater Sand Dunes (41644 acres)
- Natural Corrals Archeological Site (1116 acres)
- Pine Springs (6055 acres)
- Special Status Plant Species (1009 acres)
- White Mountain Petroglyphs (21.7 acres)

== See also ==
- United States
  - Department of the Interior
    - Bureau of Land Management
