= West Elks AVA =

Viticultural area in Colorado

Coordinates: 38°51′58″N 107°36′19″W

West Elks
- Wine region
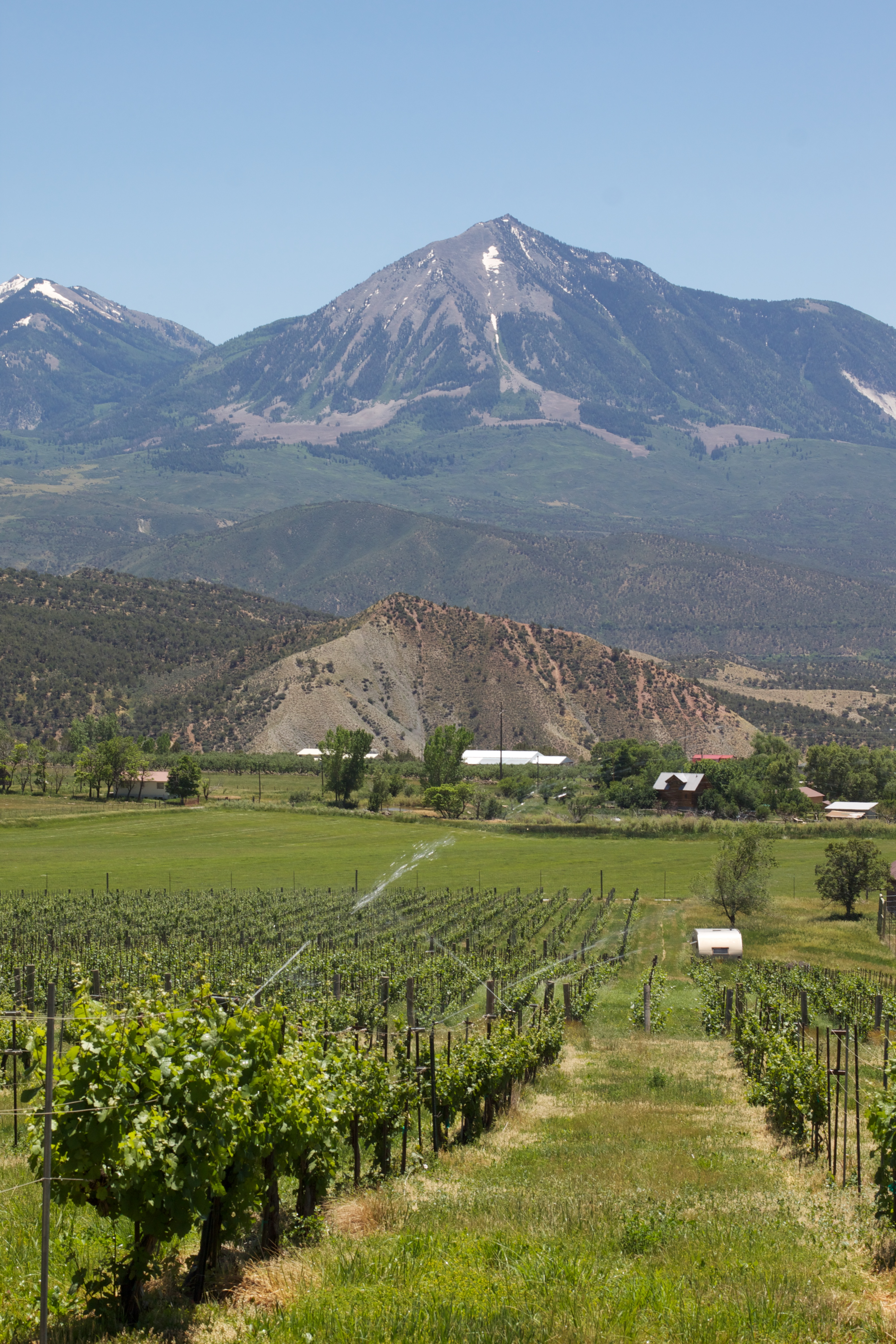
- North Fork Valley vineyard
- Type: American Viticultural Area
- Year established: 2001
- Country: United States
- Part of: Colorado
- Other regions in Colorado: Grand Valley AVA
- Climate region: Continental
- Precipitation (annual average): rain: 12.7 in (322.6 mm) snow: 41.4 in (105.2 cm)
- Soil conditions: Granite, Sand, and Loam, some lime, alkaline soils.
- Total area: 48,000 acres (75 sq mi)
- Size of planted vineyards: 84 acres (34 ha)
- No. of vineyards: 10
- Grapes produced: Cabernet Franc, Cayuga, Chambourcin, Chardonnay, Gewurztraminer, Marechal Foch, Merlot, Pinot Gris, Pinot noir, Riesling
- No. of wineries: 12

West Elks is an American Viticultural Area (AVA) located in Delta County on the Western Slope of Colorado within the North Fork Valley surrounding the towns of Cedaredge, Hotchkiss and Paonia. It was established as the nation's 140^{th} and the Centennial State's second appellation on March 6, 2001 by the Bureau of Alcohol, Tobacco and Firearms (ATF), Treasury after reviewing the petition submitted by Barbara E. Heck on behalf of local grape growers and winery owners proposing a viticultural area in Delta County, Colorado, known as "West Elks."
The viticultural area takes its name from the nearby West Elk Mountains. The area is located on mesa lands with 48,405 acres (76 sq mi) expanding along the North Fork Gunnison River from the historic mining town of Bowie, through Paonia and Hotchkiss. Its borders are the West Elk Range to the east and the higher Grand Mesa to the north. To the south, Crawford and Fruitland Mesa have higher elevations and the plateau climbs until it reaches the north rim of Black Canyon of the Gunnison. To the west lies the barren Adobe Badlands which has little plant growth. State Highway 133 bisects the AVA in a north–south direction. The high-altitude vineyards are situated mostly at 5,400 to 6,400 feet (1,600–2,000 m) above sea level.

The surrounding mountains limit access to the area, resulting in a far more secluded wine industry, when compared to its neighbor to the northwest, the Grand Valley AVA. The highest altitude AVA in the United States also boasts the highest altitude vineyards in the Northern Hemisphere. Due to the elevation, the mild growing season starts about two weeks later and has 30% fewer days between the last spring frost and the first fall frost than the Grand Valley. Consequently, the valley features many of the central European grape varieties quite successfully, such as Riesling, Gewurztraminer, Chardonnay, Pinot Gris and other lesser-known whites as well as red varieties Cabernet Franc, Pinot Noir, Merlot, and Chambourcin.

== Terroir ==
=== Topography ===
West Elks viticultural area is known for having some of the highest altitude vineyards in North America. The elevation, along with very low humidity and cool nights, produces quality fruit with good flavor. The area is completely protected and sheltered by lofty mesas and mountain ranges as the surrounding areas help protect the viticultural area from severe storms and climatic disturbances which often injure or destroy fruit. The boundaries of West Elks are defined by elevated geography. The far eastern boundary, Juanita Junction, sits at 5,942 feet (1,811 m). The eastern line projects mainly at 6,200 feet (1,900 m). The southern border of the viticultural area follows section lines of the U.S.G.S. maps with elevations that range from 5,300 to 5,800 feet (1,600–1,800 m). The northern border rises from 5,900 to 6,900 feet (1,800–2,100 m). The elevations surrounding West Elks AVA are much higher where the eastern elevations reach 11,000 feet (3,400 m). Grand Mesa is located to the north and rises to about 10,000 feet (3,000 m). To the south, Crawford and Fruitland Mesa have higher elevations and the plateau climbs until it reaches the north rim of the Black Canyon of the Gunnison. To the west, the Adobe Badlands, on which there is very little growth, and the Redlands Mesa sit above 6,200 feet (1,900 m) separating West Elks AVA from Delta, Cedaredge and the Surface Creek areas. The fertile farming area to the east of Delta lies under the 5,000 feet (1,500 m) level, resulting in a longer growing season than West Elks.

=== Climate ===
Air drainage is a geographical feature affecting viticulture found in any river valley. It is manifested by the tendency of cool air to sink along the surrounding topography and drain to the surface of the water. The phenomenon draws warmer air closer to the ground and reduces the incidence of frost damage. The climate of West Elks viticultural area is rather mild. With over 300 full sun days a year, grape sugar contents are high. The West Elk Loop Scenic and Historical Byway brochure states ". . . warm days, cool nights, and the so-called Million Dollar Breeze which flows down valley enhance the growing season." The areas surrounding the West Elks viticultural area are much cooler due to their higher elevations. Annual precipitation for the region is 12.7 inches (322.6 mm) and snowfall 41.4 inches (105.2 cm). The USDA plant hardiness zone range is 6a to 7a.

=== Soil ===
The soils of the West Elks AVA distinguish it from the surrounding areas. The area is composed mostly of Aqua Fria-Saration soils, which are deep and moderately deep well-drained stony soils that formed in outwash alluvium derived from igneous rock. To the north of the area, the soils change to Delson-Cerro soils and to the east the soils are Fughes-Bulkley, Absarokee-Beenom and Delson-Cerro. Billings-Gullied land soils are found to the south of the viticultural area.

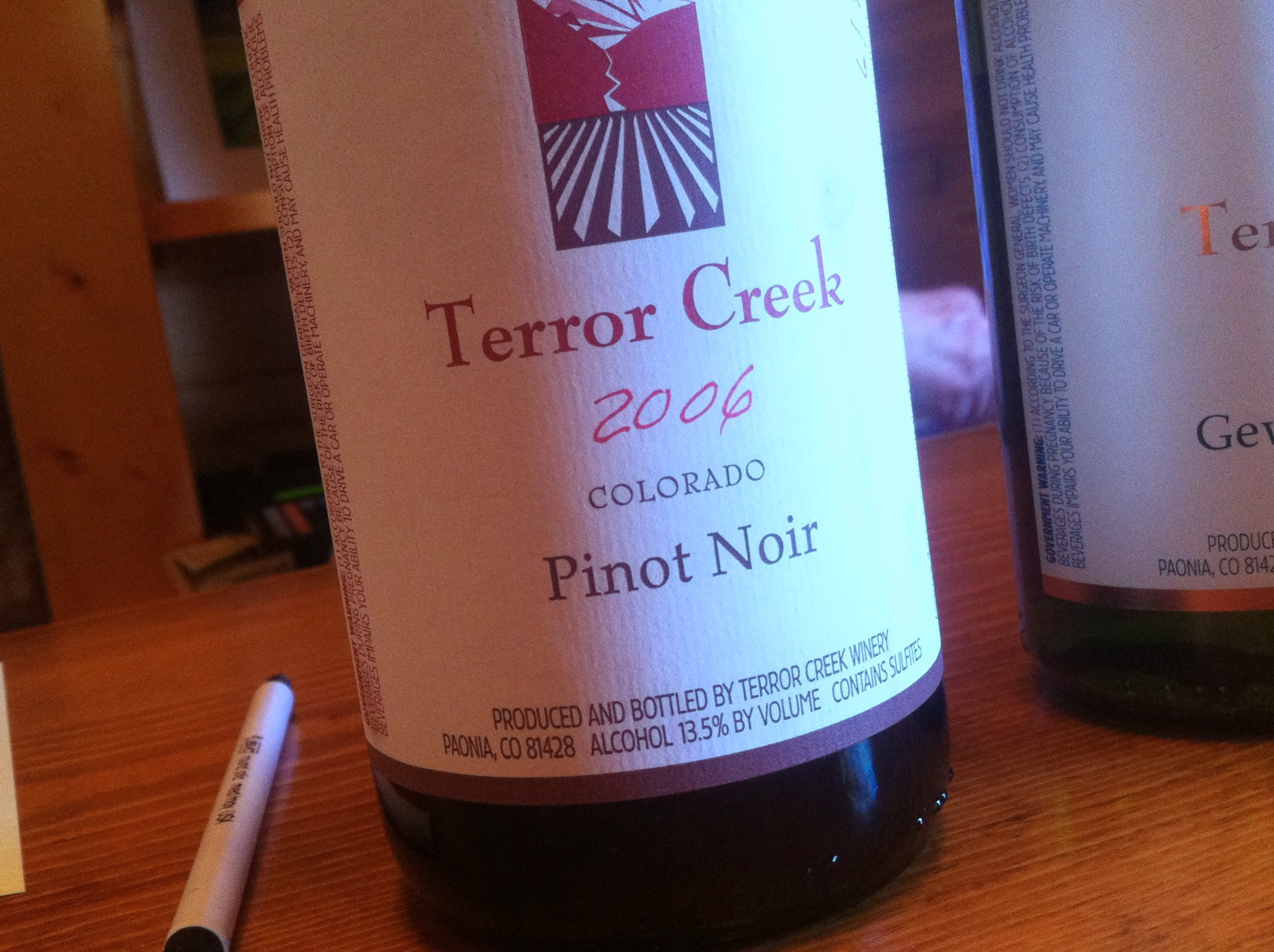
North Fork Valley wine

== Wine industry ==
The area encompasses approximately 75 square miles (48,000 acres) with 84 acres (34 ha) of vineyards currently planted in West Elks and the area presently has eighteen vineyard and/or winery businesses. West Elks wineries host two significant annual events, "North Fork Uncorked" and the "West Elks Wine Trail."
