= Rena Mary Taylor =

Colorado state legislator

Rena Mary Taylor was a state legislator in Colorado. She was a Republican. She served in the Colorado House of Representatives from 1951-1958. She represented Mesa County, Colorado. She served in the Colorado Senate in the 1960s.

She lived in Palisade, Colorado.
