= Natural Corrals Archeological Site =

- Natural Corrals Archeological Site (48SW336)
- U.S. National Register of Historic Places
- Nearest city: South Superior, Wyoming
- Area: 12 acres (4.9 ha)
- NRHP reference No.: 87000873
- Added to NRHP: August 17, 1987

The Natural Corrals is an Area of Critical Environmental Concern and an archeological site in Sweetwater County, Wyoming. The Natural Corrals Archeological Site has Smithsonian trinomial designation of 48SW336.

The Natural Corrals Area of Critical Environmental Concern, is a 1,116 acres (452 ha) area "of unique geologic and cultural features." The area was used in prehistory as a camp area and the natural corrals present may have been used for bison kills. It is on Bureau of Land Management-administered lands. A 12-acre (4.9 ha) area of the site was listed on the U.S. National Register of Historic Places in 1987. It was deemed important for its potential to yield information in the future. The National Register does not publicly release the location; it is recorded as "Address restricted".
