= Gordon Swann =

American geologist (1931–2014)

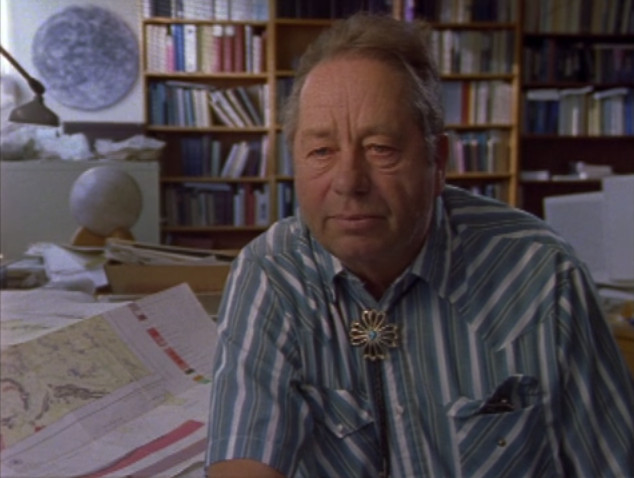
- Gordon Swann in 1998
- Born: September 21, 1931; Palisade, Colorado, US
- Died: May 22, 2014 (aged 82)
- Education: University of Colorado
- Scientific career
- Workplaces: NASA; University of Northern Arizona
- Military career
- Allegiance: United States
- Branch: United States Navy
- Service years: 1952–1956

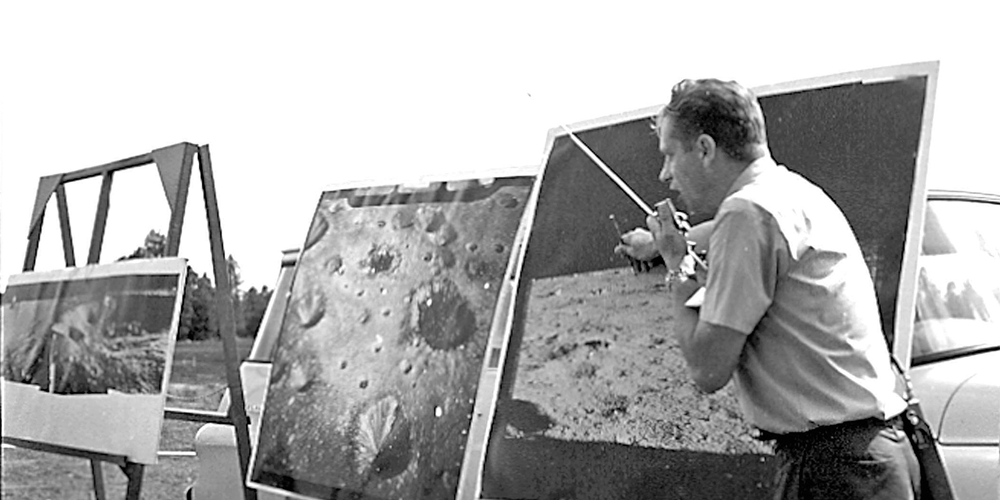
Gordon Swann giving briefing for Lunar Roving Vehicle demonstration at Cinder Lake Crater Field, near Flagstaff, Arizona, in about 1970

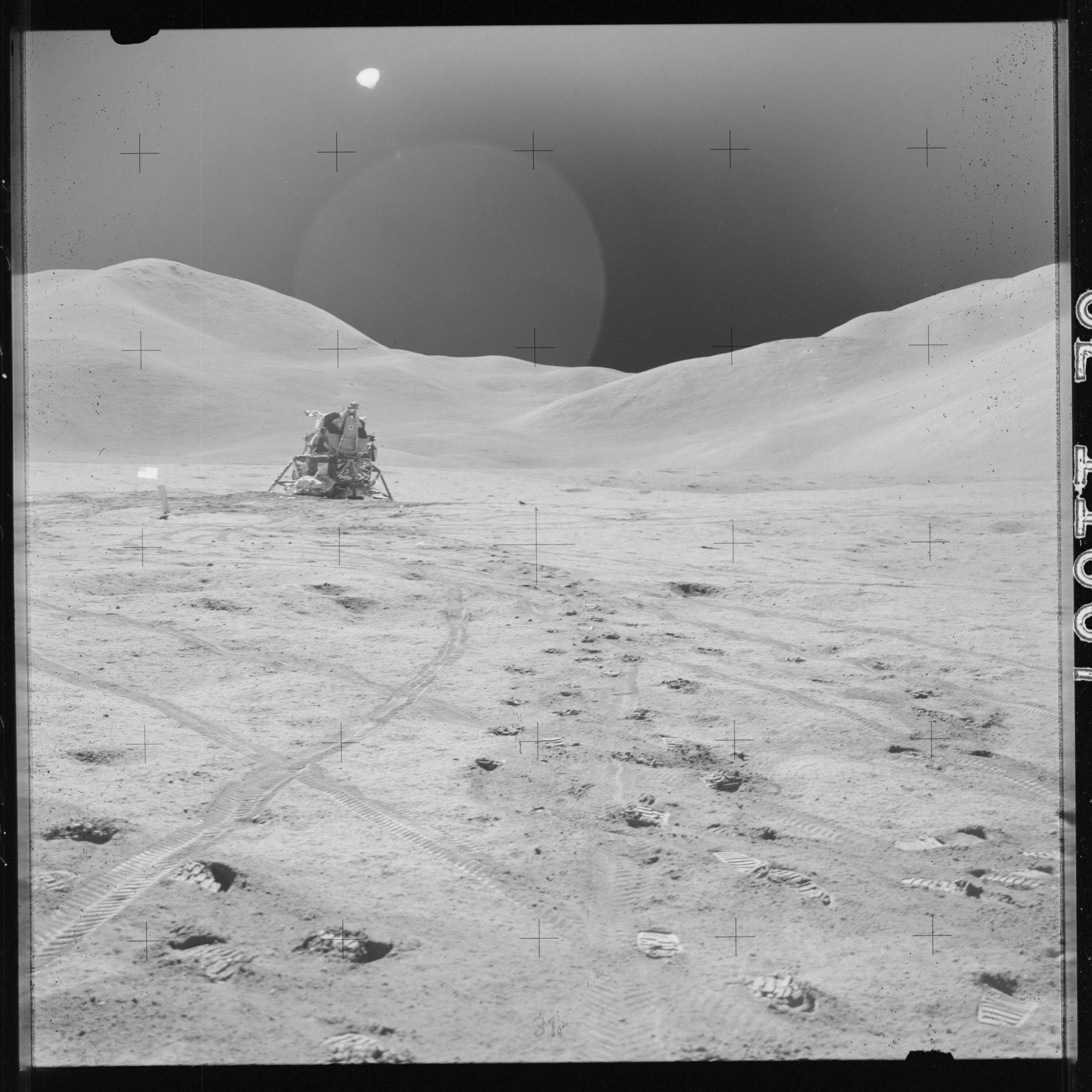
The mountains behind the Lunar Module Falcon in this Apollo 15 photo are informally called the Swann Range (AS15-82-11057)

Gordon Alfred Swann (September 21, 1931 – May 22, 2014) was an American geologist. Born in Palisade, Colorado, he went to high school in Olathe, Colorado, and then served in the U.S. Navy from 1952 to 1956. He received his PhD from the University of Colorado in 1962, and studied the Precambrian geology of the Front Range of Colorado while working for U.S. Geological Survey. He is notable for his work with NASA and the training of the astronauts of the Apollo program in field geology.

Swann served as the Principal Investigator of the Apollo Lunar Geologic Experiment for Apollo 14 and Apollo 15. A part of the Montes Apenninus (south of Mons Hadley) at the Apollo 15 landing site was informally called the Swann Range in his honor by the astronauts.

Besides his work for NASA, Swann was an adjunct professor at the University of Northern Arizona.

In his non-academic life Swann was a Master at the Flagstaff Masonic Lodge.

== Books and publications ==
- Karlstrom, N. V.; Swann, Gordon A.; Eastwood, Raymond L., eds. (1974). Geology of Northern Arizona with Notes on Archaeology and Paleoclimate. Geological Society of America. hdl:10150/630724.
- Swann, G. A.; et al. (1977). Geology of the Apollo 14 landing site in the Fra Mauro highlands. National Aeronautics and Space Administration. LCCN 74026964. OCLC 1104157.

== Recognition ==
- The asteroid 4082 Swann is named after him by the Minor Planet Center.
- NASA Exceptional Scientific Achievement Medal
- American Institute of Professional Geologists Excellence Award
- Thirty Third Degree Scottish Rite Mason, plus two Albert Pike awards
