= De Beque Canyon =

Canyon on the Colorado River

Coordinates: 39°08′56″N 108°18′52″W

De Beque Canyon is a narrow canyon on the Colorado River in western Colorado in the United States. It is approximately 15 miles (24 km) long, located on the river downstream from the town of De Beque, in eastern Mesa County. The canyon forms a narrow passage where the river passes along the western end of the Grand Mesa. At its lower end, the canyon opens out on the eastern end of the Grand Valley at the town of Palisade, approximately 10 miles (16 km) east of Grand Junction. Interstate 70 follows the river through the canyon.

Geologically the canyon walls are stairstep cliffs of Mesaverde Group, shoreline sands deposited during the Cretaceous. The sedimentary rock layers contain several low-sulfur coal seams that thicken to as much as 50 feet (15 m) at the Cameo Mine near Mile 46 on Interstate 70. The coal is typically soft bituminous coal, since it has never been compressed by overlying rocks to the degree required to form harder coal.

== See also ==
- Glenwood Canyon
