= Garnet Range =

Mountain range in Montana, United States

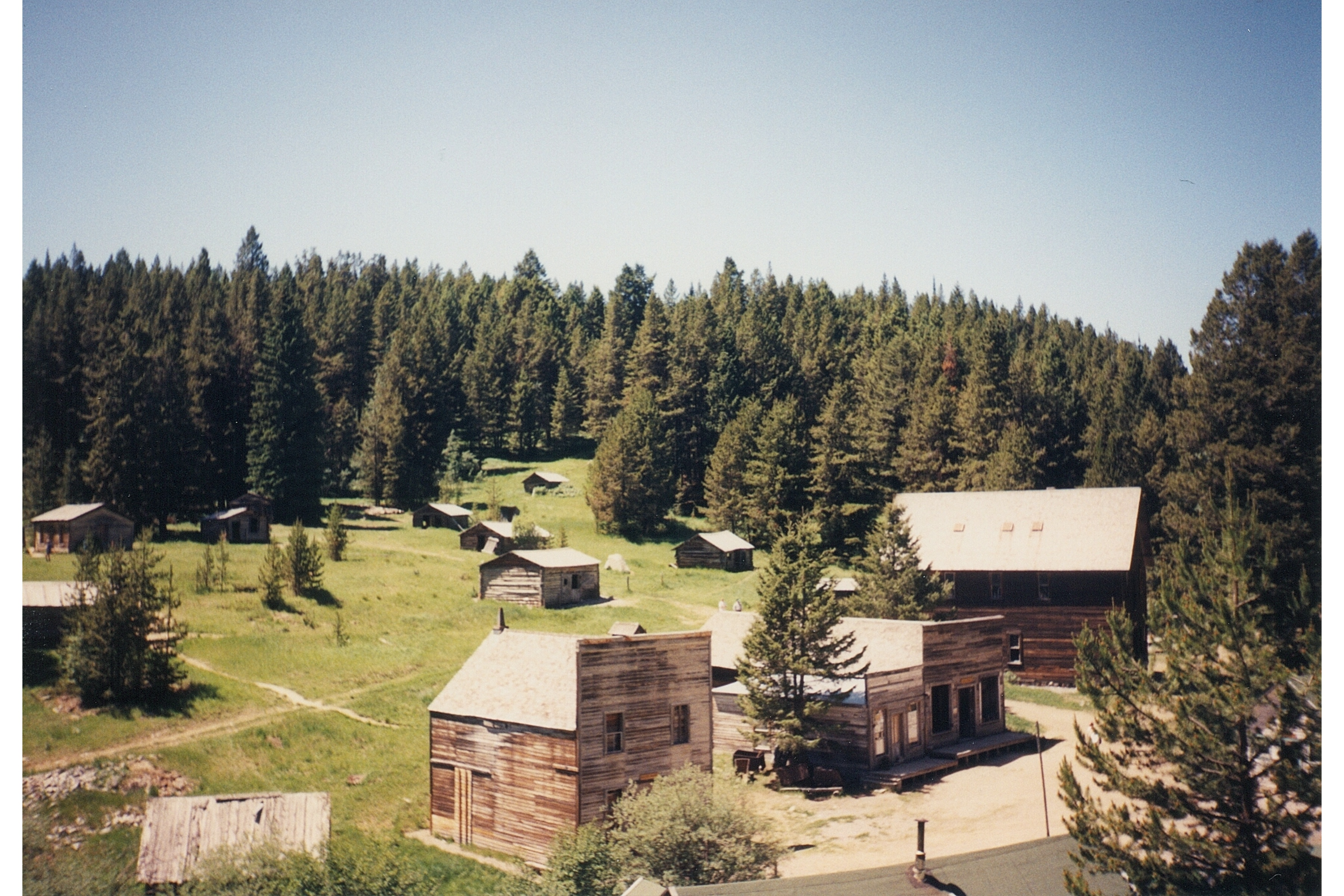
- Garnet Ghost Town, Garnet Range

Highest point
- Peak: Old Baldy Mountain
- Elevation: 7,511 ft (2,289 m)
- Coordinates: 46°42′38″N 112°52′17″W

Geography
- Location within Montana
- Country: United States
- State: Montana

The Garnet Range, highest point Old Baldy Mountain, elevation 7,511 feet (2,289 m), is a mountain range northeast of Drummond, Montana in Powell County, Montana.

A popular historic site, Garnet Ghost Town, is in the Garnet Range. Situated on Bureau of Land Management (BLM) land, the ghost town is the remnant of a mining settlement that was inhabited from the late 1800s to the 1930s. The town's population reached several thousand during its peak. A visitor center and self-guided tours are available.

Although heavily forested, no portion of the Garnet Range is part of the National Forest system. The BLM owns much of the range, including the 11,580-acre Wales Creek Wilderness Study Area. The Wales Creek WSA is the last major drainage area without a road in the western Garnets, and features dense forests of lodgepole pine, spruce, Douglas fir, larch, aspen, and subalpine fir. Wales Creek WSA also hosts a thriving moose herd, goshawk nesting sites, a native cutthroat trout fishery, and four hot springs used in the past by miners and now by skiers and hunters.

Another BLM Wilderness Study Area is in the eastern Garnets: the 11,380-acre Hoodoo Mountain WSA. This WSA is separated from unprotected BLM land in the Gallagher Creek drainage by a dirt road. Petrified wood is found along streams in the Gallagher Creek area.

On the southern slope of the Garnets near the town of Drummond, the BLM's Rattler Gulch Area of Critical Environmental Concern protects 20 acres of exposed Madison Group limestone cliffs. Parking is provided, as Rattler Gulch is a popular rock-climbing area.

Grizzly bears have recently been confirmed inhabiting the Garnets.

== See also ==
- List of mountain ranges in Montana
