= Adobe Badlands =

Wildlife study area in Colorado, United States

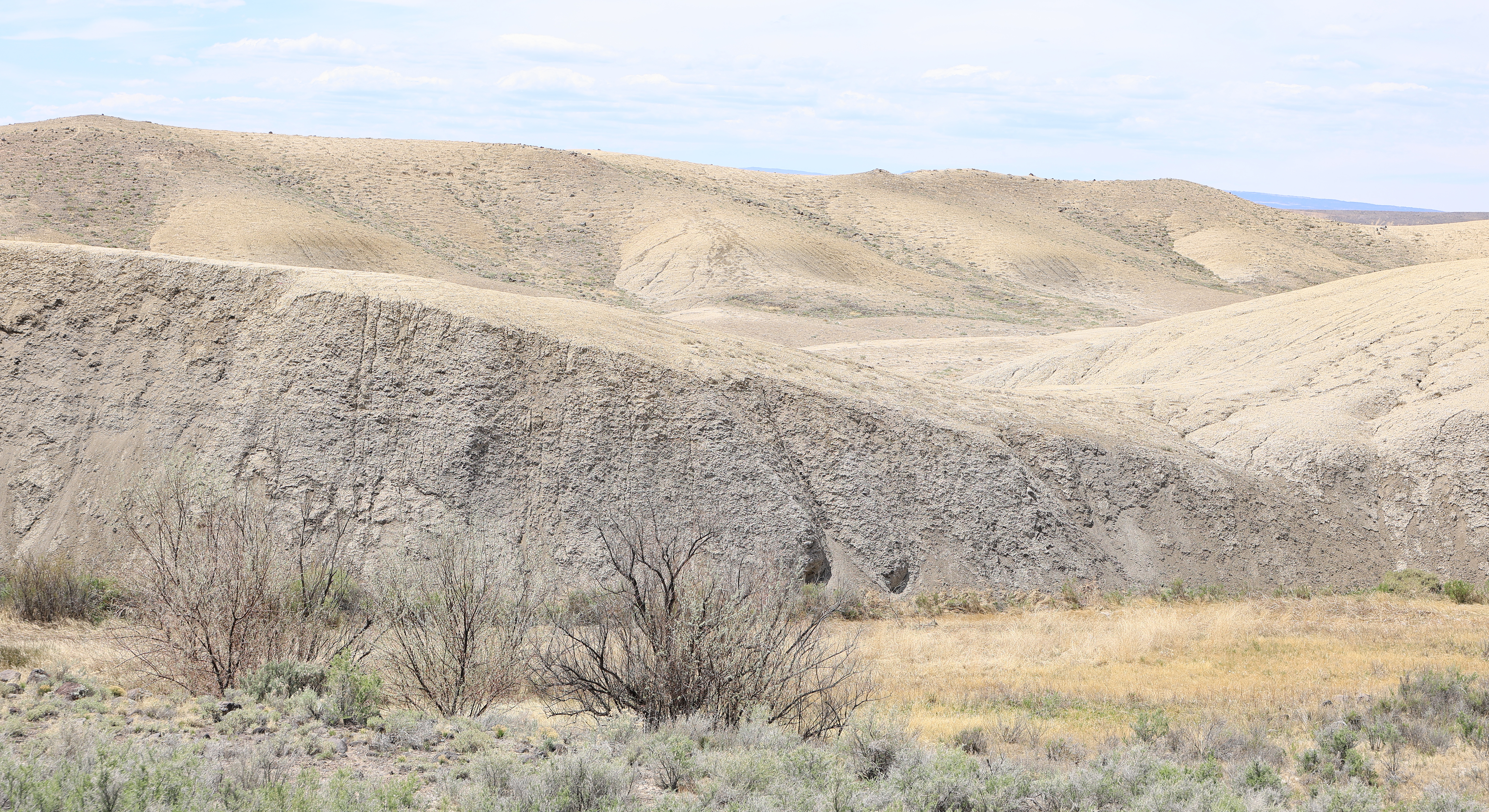

- Location within Colorado
- Location: Delta County, Colorado
- Nearest city: Delta, Colorado
- Coordinates: 38°48′23″N 108°4′16″W
- Area: 10,320 acres (41.8 km^{2})
- Elevation: 5,755 feet (1,754 meters) (Devils Thumb)
- Governing body: Bureau of Land Management
- Website: blm.gov

The Adobe Badlands are a barren area with a moonlike landscape located between Delta, Colorado, U.S., and Grand Mesa. Part of the badlands lie within the Adobe Badlands Wildlife Study Area (WSA), owned and managed by the Bureau of Land Management. The wildlife study area overlaps with the larger Adobe Badlands Area of Critical Environmental Concern (ACEC).

== Geographical features ==
Two documented geographical features occur within the wildlife study area, and one is found outside of it but within the area of critical environmental concern. Devils Thumb, a rock pilar, elevation 5,755 feet (1,754 meters), and Petrie Mesa, elevation 6,444 feet (1,964 meters), are within the WSA. The Adobe Buttes, elevation 5,640 feet (1,720 meters), lie to the east of the WSA and are within the ACEC.

There are no formal trails within the Adobe Badlands, but one can hike anywhere in them, for there is practically no vegetation to get in the way. However, the clay-like nature of the shale makes hiking difficult when the ground is wet.

== Geology ==
The badlands are made up of Mancos Shale.
