= Mount Garfield (Mesa County, Colorado) =

Mountain in Colorado, United States

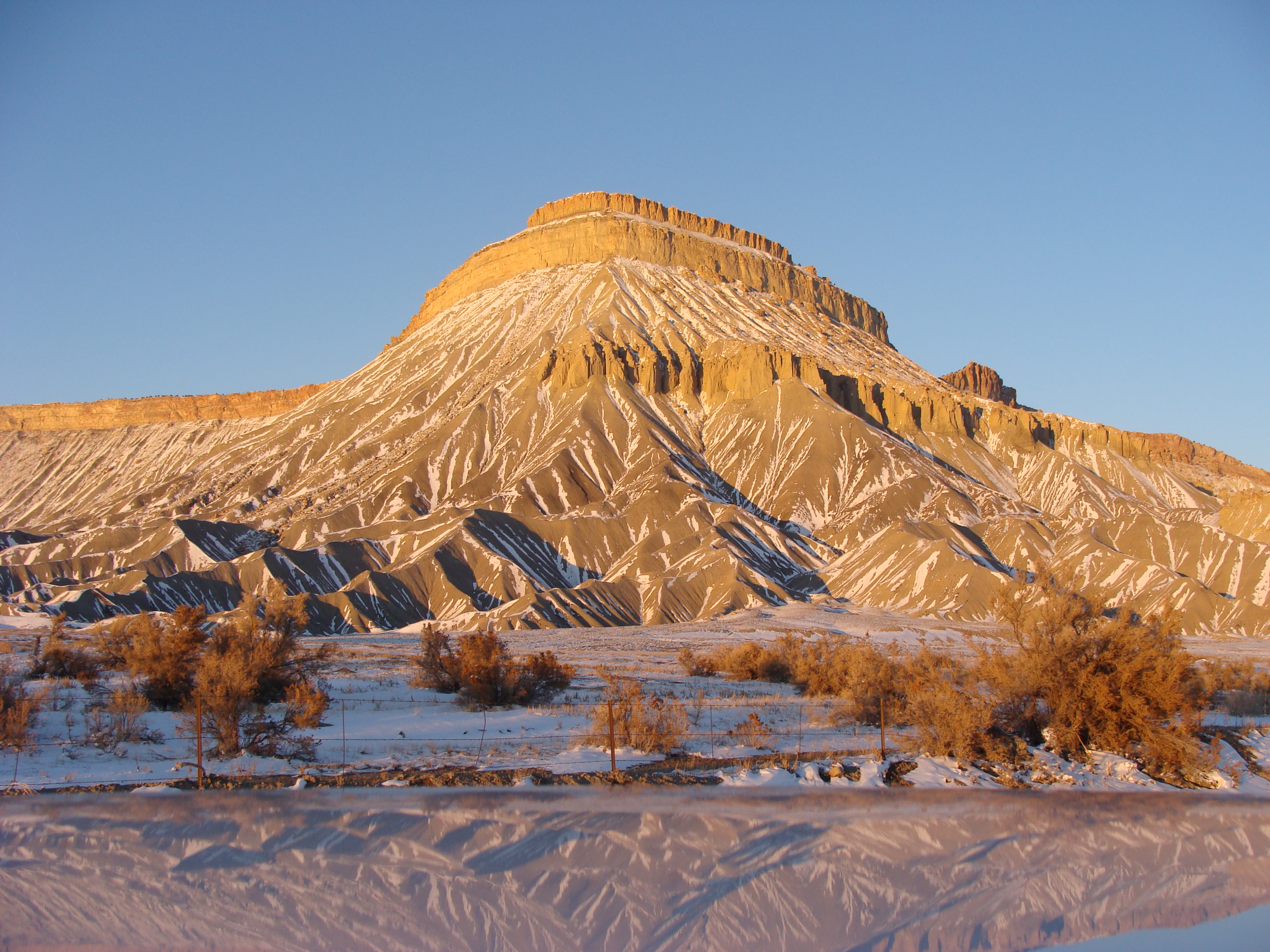
- Southwest aspect

Highest point
- Elevation: 6,765 ft (2,062 m)
- Prominence: 445 ft (136 m)
- Isolation: 5.54 mi (8.92 km)
- Coordinates: 39°07′29″N 108°24′37″W

Geography
- Location within Colorado Location within the United States
- Location: Mesa County, Colorado, U.S.
- Parent range: Colorado Plateau
- Topo map: USGS Clifton

Geology
- Rock age: Late Cretaceous
- Rock type(s): sandstone, mudstone, shale

Climbing
- Easiest route: class 1 hiking

Mt. Garfield is the high point of the Book Cliffs, east-northeast of Grand Junction, and overlooking the town of Palisade. Two classic hiking trails ascend the mountain. The mountain was named after President James Garfield a year after Garfield's death. The mountain is composed of Mesaverde Group overlaying Mancos Shale.

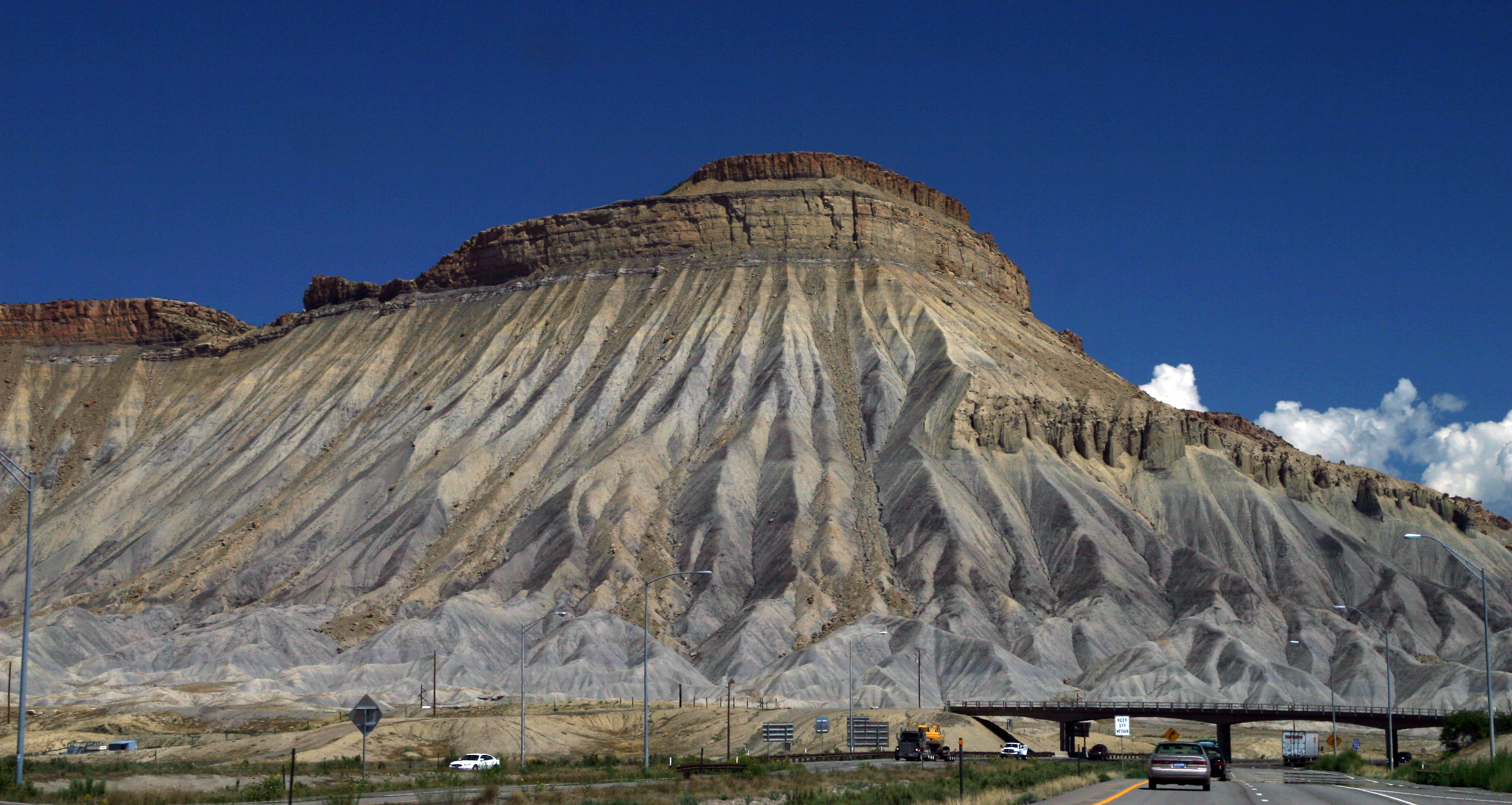
Mt. Garfield from Interstate 70
