= 4082 Swann =

Asteroid within the Asteroid Belt

Discovery
- Discovered by: C. Shoemaker
- Discovery site: Palomar Obs.
- Discovery date: 27 September 1984

Designations
- Named after: Gordon Swann (American geologist)
- Alternative designations: 1984 SW_{3} · 1947 UF; 1969 PE
- Minor planet category: main-belt · (inner)

Orbital characteristics
- Epoch 4 September 2017 (JD 2458000.5)
- Uncertainty parameter 0
- Observation arc: 69.54 yr (25,399 days)
- Aphelion: 3.0076 AU
- Perihelion: 1.7721 AU
- Semi-major axis: 2.3899 AU
- Eccentricity: 0.2585
- Orbital period (sidereal): 3.69 yr (1,349 days)
- Mean anomaly: 317.29°
- Mean motion: 0° 16^{m} 0.48^{s} / day
- Inclination: 9.5978°
- Longitude of ascending node: 294.36°
- Argument of perihelion: 100.28°

Physical characteristics
- Dimensions: 5.85 km (derived); 9.535±0.066 km 11.06±0.29 km
- Synodic rotation period: 4.03632±0.00009 h (Note: Pravec (2006) web: rotation period of 4.03632±0.00009 hours with a brightness amplitude of 0.67 mag. Summary figures for (4082) Swann at Collaborative Asteroid Lightcurve Link (CALL) and Pravec, P.; Wolf, M.; Sarounova, L. (2006)); 4.1±0.1 h
- Geometric albedo: 0.029±0.012; 0.101±0.006; 0.20 (assumed)
- Spectral type: SMASS = Ch · C
- Absolute magnitude (H): 12.90 · 13.08±0.2 (R) · 13.4 · 13.46±0.206 · 13.58±0.27 · 14.55

4082 Swann, provisional designation 1984 SW_{3}, is a carbonaceous asteroid from the inner regions of the asteroid belt, approximately 10 kilometers in diameter.

The asteroid was discovered on 27 September 1984, by American astronomer Carolyn Shoemaker at Palomar Observatory in California, United States, and later named for American geologist Gordon Swann.

== Orbit and classification ==
Swann orbits the Sun in the inner main-belt at a distance of 1.8–3.0 AU once every 3 years and 8 months (1,349 days). Its orbit has an eccentricity of 0.26 and an inclination of 10° with respect to the ecliptic. First identified as 1947UF at the Finnish Turku Observatory in 1947, Swann's observation arc was extended by 37 years prior to its official discovery observation at Palomar.

== Physical characteristics ==
The C-type asteroid is classified as a Ch-subtype in the SMASS taxonomy.

=== Diameter and albedo ===
According to the surveys carried out by the Japanese Akari satellite and NASA's Wide-field Infrared Survey Explorer with its subsequent NEOWISE mission, Swann measures 9.5 and 11.1 kilometers in diameter and its surface has an albedo of 0.029 and 0.101, respectively. The Collaborative Asteroid Lightcurve Link, however, assumes a standard albedo for stony asteroids of 0.20 and derives a much smaller diameter of 5.85 kilometers, based on an absolute magnitude of 13.46.

=== Rotation period ===
In July 2006, a rotational lightcurve of Swann was obtained from photometric observations by Petr Pravec at the Ondřejov Observatory in the Czech Republic. It gave a rotation period of 4.03632±0.00009 hours with a brightness variation of 0.67 magnitude (U=3). A second lightcurve obtained by Jean-Gabriel Bosch in September 2006, gave a period of 4.1±0.1 hours and an amplitude of 0.35 magnitude (U=2).

== Naming ==
This minor planet was named after American geologist Gordon A. Swann (born 1931). He served as the principal investigator of the "Apollo Lunar Geologic Experiment" conducted at the lunar landing sites of Apollo 14 and Apollo 15. The official naming citation was published by the Minor Planet Center on 12 December 1989 (M.P.C. 15576).
