= Government Highline Canal =

Coordinates: 39.1167°N 108.5367°W

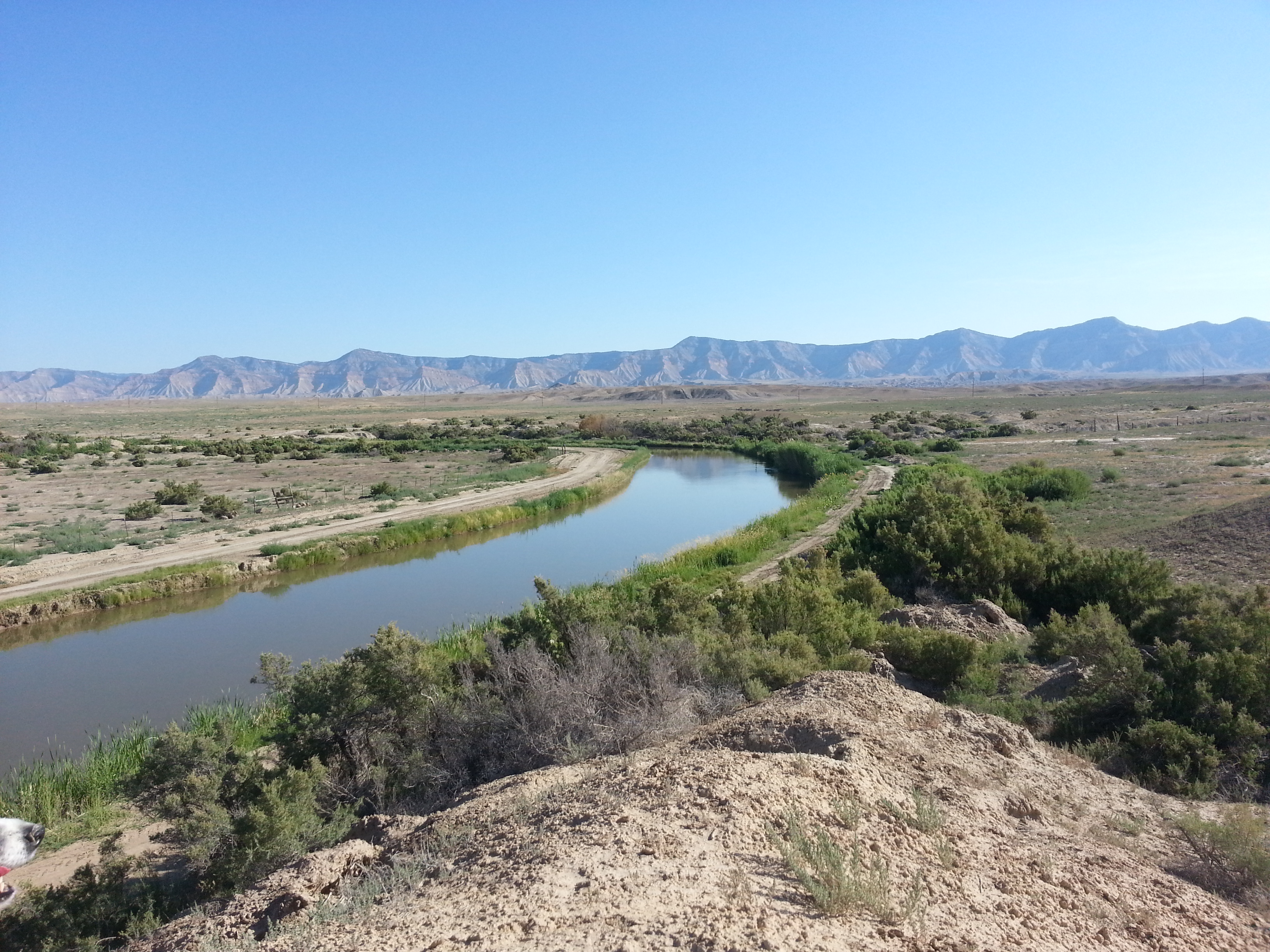
The Government Highline Canal

The functional Government High Line Canal, also known as the Grand Valley Project, runs along the settled northern edge of the Grand Valley near Grand Junction, Colorado. The canal was built by the U.S. Bureau of Reclamation and is owned by the federal government, through authorization of the 1902 Reclamation Act.

The Bureau of Reclamation is the branch of the federal government charged with constructing large irrigation projects, like dams and canals, that made western settlement possible. The Government Highline Canal was started in 1902 and completed in 1917, after many delays caused by private landowners whose land needed to be condemned to make the project possible. The Canal is 55 miles long and carries 1,675 second feet (s/f) of water. The project consists of a single, 14 foot high, concrete diversion weir on the Colorado River with a movable crest that provides water to four canals that stretch over 90 miles through the region. In 1903, a Grand Junction group proposed that the project be constructed by a private party using private financing, but after several years it became apparent that private construction would not proceed.

In 1909, a U.S. Army Board of Engineers met and determined the project was feasible, and the U.S. Government allocated $1.5 million - equivalent to over $38 million today - to construct the Highline Canal system and its bank maintenance roads. By the mid-1930s, project facilities began to show a significant amount of wear and tear. Wooden structures were beginning to fail, culverts washed out, tunnels were showing wear and the attractive canal banks and roads were beginning to show signs of deterioration. The U.S. Government and taxpayers again came to the rescue in 1935, when the Civilian Conservation Corps established camps on project lands and began to repair and rehabilitate the features of the Government Highline Canal. This magnificent irrigation project, funded by public monies, made the area's famous agricultural industries, like fruit and wine, possible, and made it possible for private farmland owners to make a living off of their land for many generations. The Grand Valley Water Users Association leases the canal facilities from the U.S. Government and operates the canal as a non-profit, charging users for the use of the water.
