= Book Cliffs =

Geographic feature in Colorado and Utah, US

Coordinates: 39°10′00″N 110°17′33″W

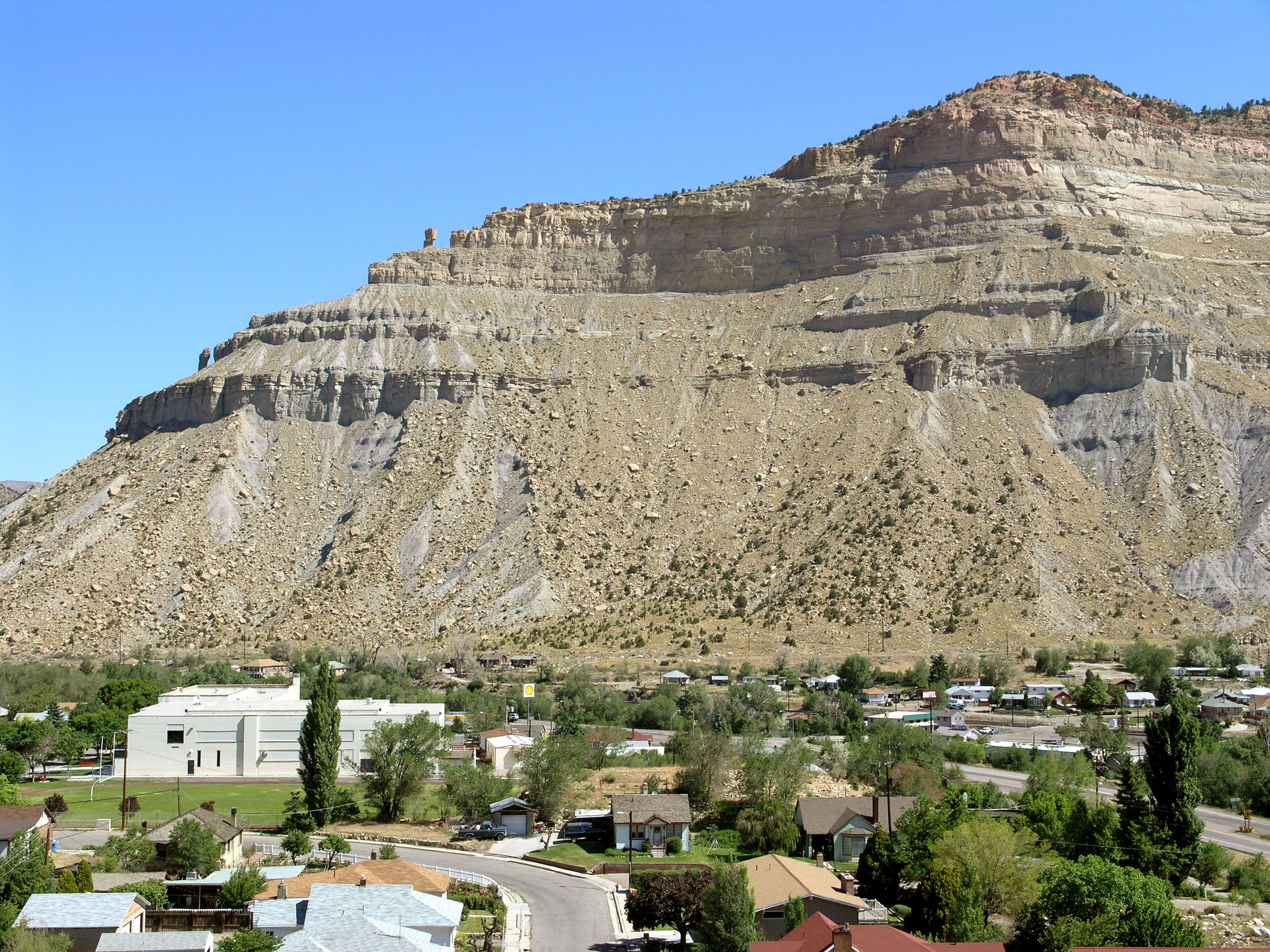
The Spring Canyon sandstones in the Book Cliffs above Helper, Utah, with several sedimentary cycles visible in the cliffs

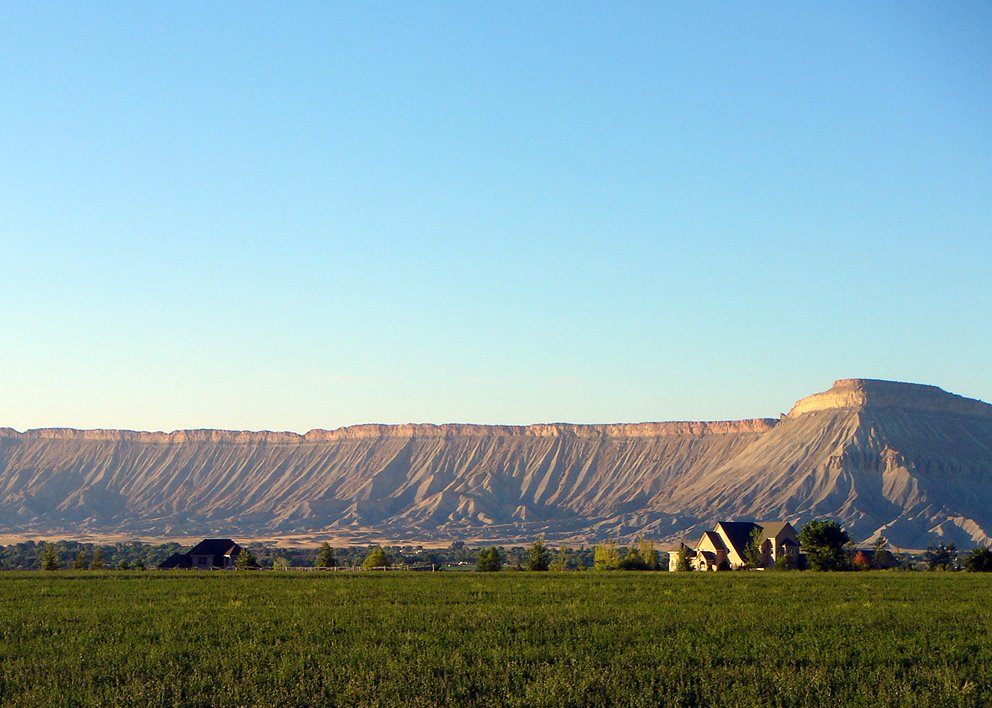
Book Cliffs and Mt. Garfield (on right, approximate altitude 6,600 ft or 2,000 m) in Mesa County, Colorado

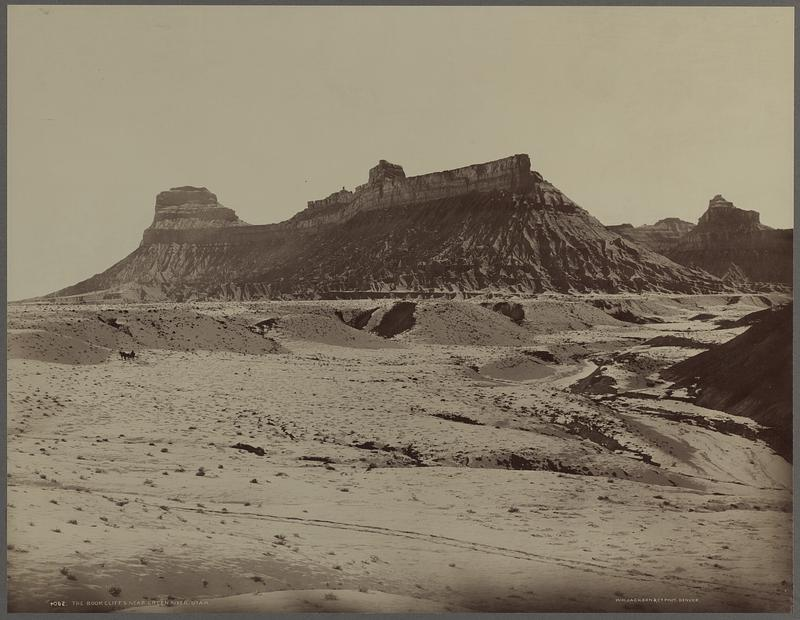
The Book Cliffs near Green River, Utah, ca. 1879–1894. Photographs of the American West, Boston Public Library

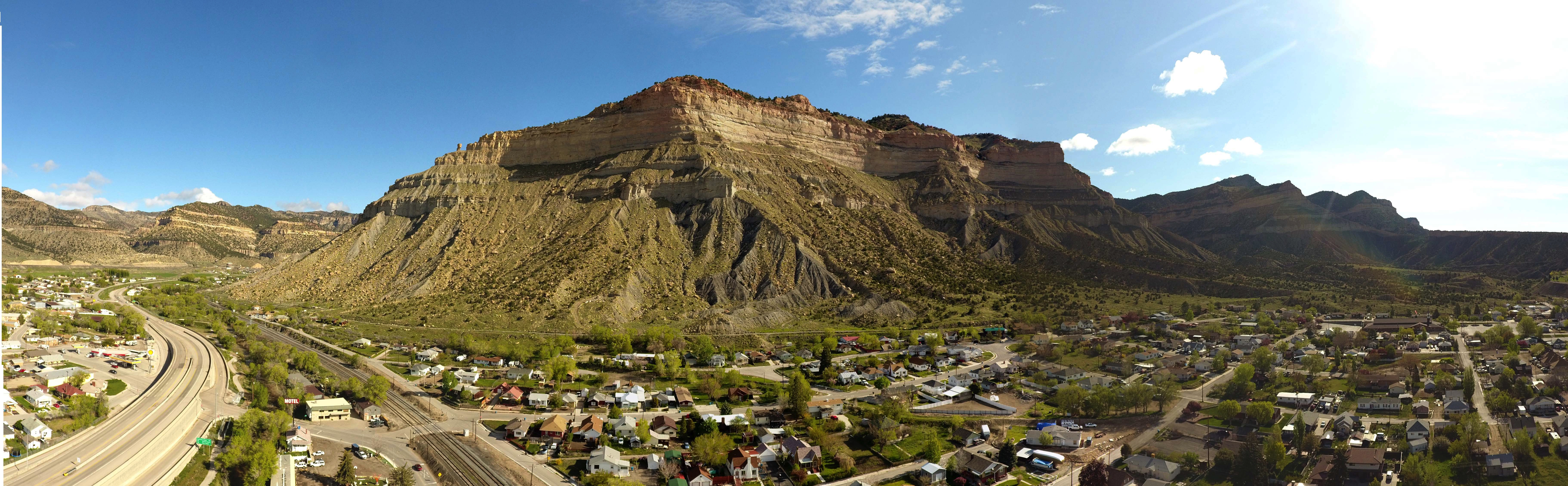
The Book Cliff in Helper, Utah

The Book Cliffs are a series of desert mountains and cliffs in western Colorado and eastern Utah in the Western United States. They are so named because the sandstone layers that make up the Cretaceous-aged cliffs capping many of the south-facing buttes appear similar to a shelf of books. The escarpment of the Book Cliffs is approximately 250 miles (400 km) long, and is the longest continuous escarpment in the world, stretching from Helper, Utah to Grand Junction, Colorado.

== Stratigraphy ==
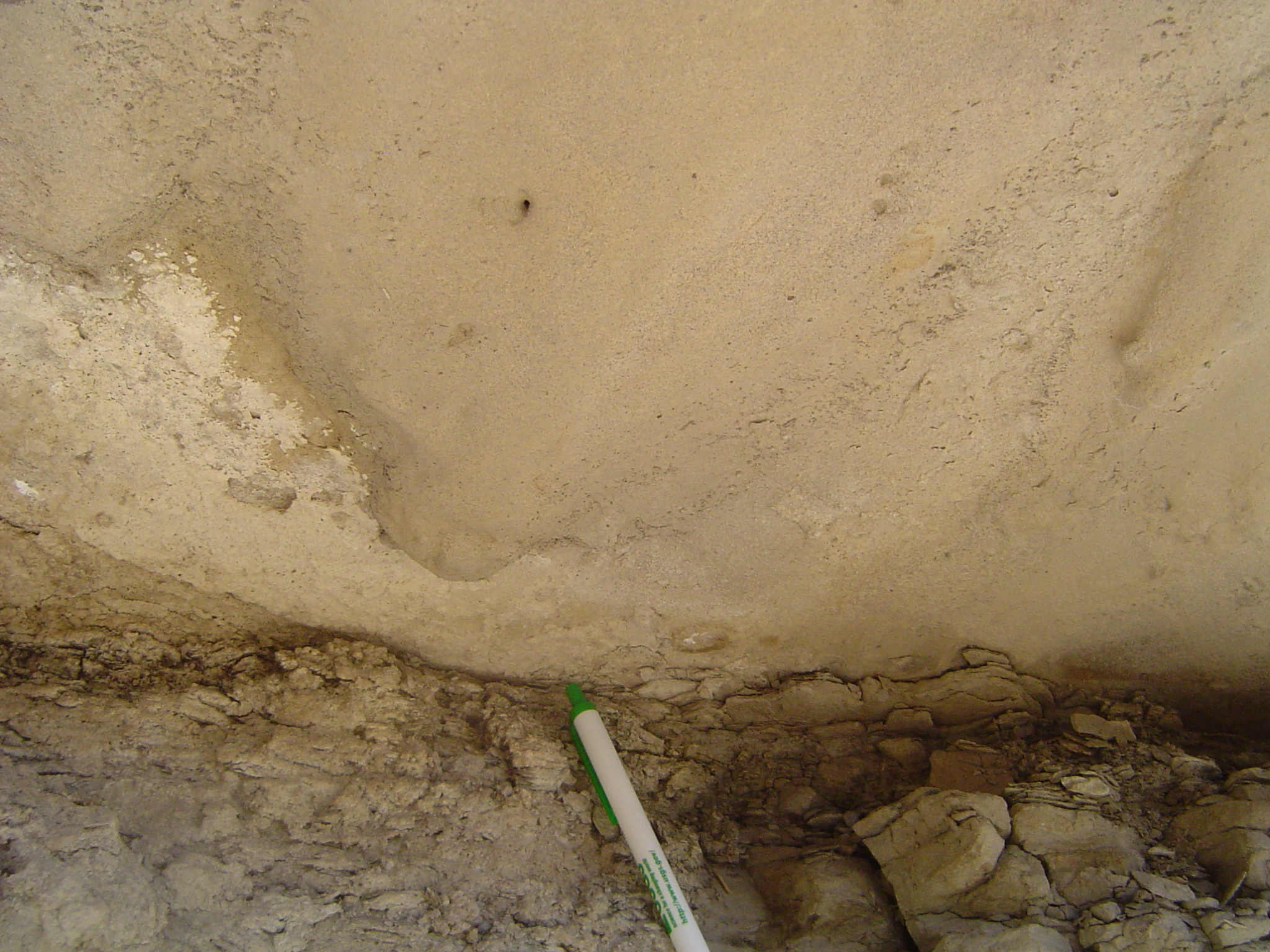
A flute cast, one of many sedimentary structures found in the Book Cliffs

The Book Cliffs are one of the world's best places to study sequence stratigraphy. In the 1980s, Exxon scientists used the Cretaceous strata of the Book Cliffs to develop the science of sequence stratigraphy. The Book Cliffs have preserved excellent strata of the foreland basin of the ancient Western Interior Seaway that stretched north from the Gulf of Mexico to the Yukon in the Cretaceous Period. Components of deltaic and shallow marine reservoirs are very well preserved in the Book Cliffs.

== Wildlife ==
There are many small streams that contain a variety of trout species.

Large mammals found in the Book Cliffs include coyotes, mountain lions, bobcats, mule deer, elk, black bears, pronghorn, American bison as an extension of the Henry Mountains bison herd and bighorn sheep. In January 2009, Utah Division of Wildlife Resources officials transplanted 31 bison from the Henry Mountains bison herd to the Book Cliffs. The new group joined 14 animals previously released in August 2008 from a private herd on the nearby Uintah and Ouray Indian Reservation. This herd is approximately 100 miles (160 km) north of the Henry Mountains across mostly harsh, desert terrain.

== See also ==
- List of mountains in Colorado
- List of mountains in Utah
- Roan Cliffs
