= George A. Crawford =

American politician, lawyer and journalist (1827–1891)

George Addison Crawford (July 27, 1827 – January 26, 1891) was an American politician, lawyer and journalist.

Crawford was born in Clinton County, Pennsylvania. He graduated from Jefferson College (now Washington & Jefferson College) in 1847.

Crawford was a delegate to the Pennsylvania Democratic State Convention in 1855. In 1857, along with Norman Eddy and others, he purchased and founded the city of Fort Scott, Kansas. He was elected governor of Kansas in 1861; however the election was declared illegal before he could assume the post.

In 1871, he was appointed commissioner to the Centennial Exposition by Ulysses S. Grant.

He was also the city founder of Grand Junction, Colorado (incorporated July 22, 1882). where he died and was buried. He is the namesake of Crawford, Colorado.
