= Palisade, Colorado =

Town in Mesa County, Colorado, United States

- Town
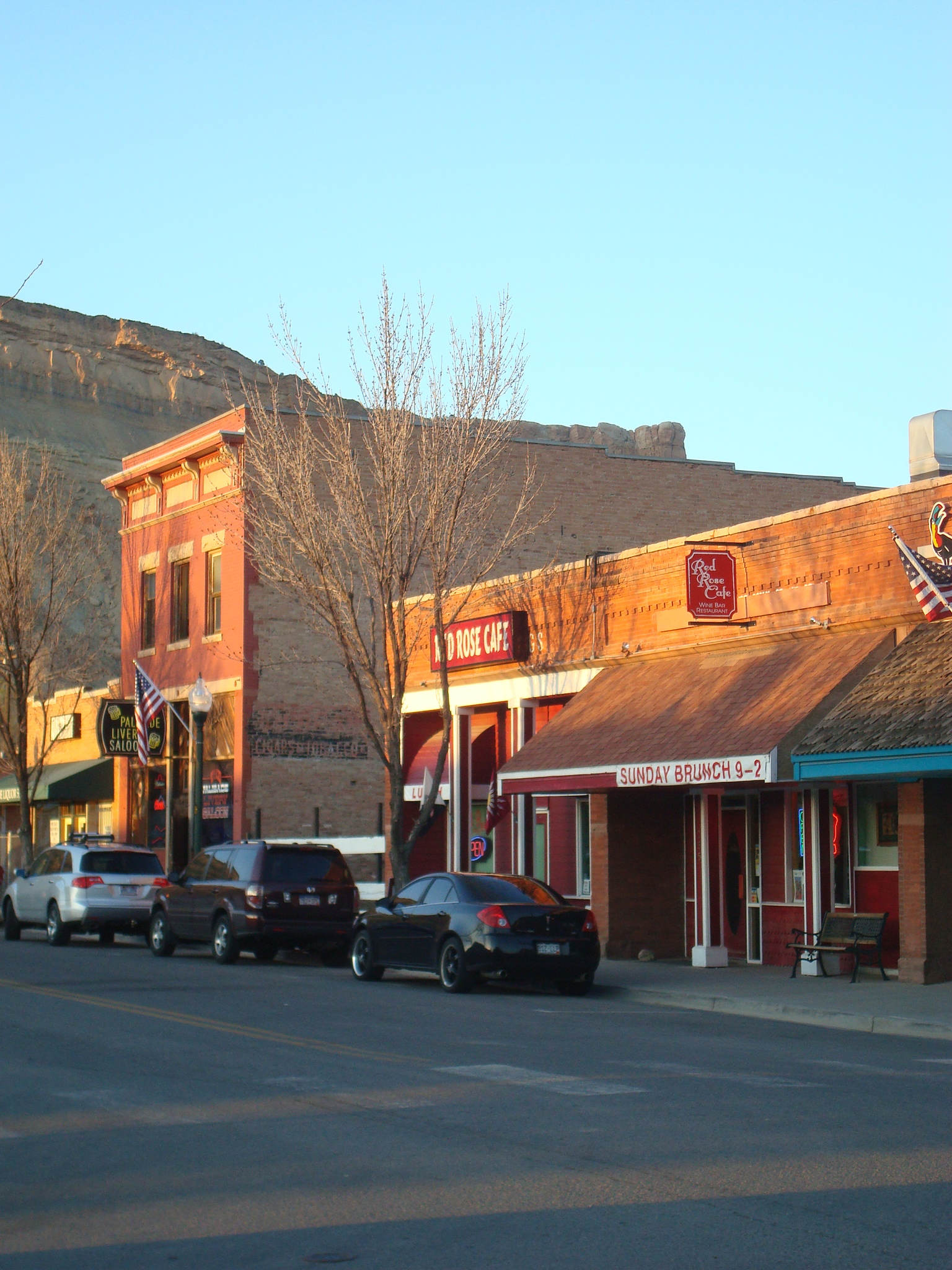
- Main Street in Palisade
- Nickname: Peach Capital of Colorado
- Location in Mesa County, Colorado
- Coordinates: 39°06′30″N 108°21′26″W
- Country: United States
- State: Colorado
- County: Mesa
- Incorporated (town): April 4, 1904

Government
  - Type: Statutory town

Area
  - Total: 1.19 sq mi (3.09 km^{2})
  - Land: 1.19 sq mi (3.08 km^{2})
  - Water: 0.0039 sq mi (0.01 km^{2})
- Elevation: 4,718 ft (1,438 m)

Population (2020)
  - Total: 2,565
  - Density: 2,155.5/sq mi (832.2/km^{2})
- Time zone: UTC-7 (Mountain (MST))
  - Summer (DST): UTC-6 (MDT)
- ZIP code: 81526
- Area code: 970
- FIPS code: 08-56970
- GNIS feature ID: 2413101
- Website: palisade.colorado.gov

Palisade is a statutory town in Mesa County, Colorado, United States. It is part of the Grand Junction Metropolitan Statistical Area. The population was 2,565 at the 2020 census, down from 2,692 in 2010.

The community was named for the cliffs near the town site. Palisade is known for its peach orchards and wine vineyards. The climate, a 182-day growing season, and an average 78 percent of sunshine makes Palisade "The Peach Capital of Colorado".

== Geography ==
Palisade lies on the north side of the Colorado River, 11 miles (18 km) east of Grand Junction, the county seat. U.S. Route 6 passes through the town as 8th Street, while Interstate 70 runs along the northern border of the town at the foot of the cliffs to the north, with access to the town from Exit 42.

According to the United States Census Bureau, the town has a total area of 1.2 square miles (3.1 km^{2}), of which 0.006 square miles (0.016 km^{2}), or 0.50%, are water.

=== Climate ===
Palisade has a cool semi-arid climate (Köppen BSk), relatively mild by Colorado standards. On average each year the town sees 13 inches (0.33 m) of snow and 10 inches (250 mm) of precipitation, with the wettest calendar year having been 1983 with 19.37 inches or 492.0 millimeters, and the driest 1956 with 4.68 inches or 118.9 millimeters. The most precipitation in one month has been 4.49 inches or 114.0 millimeters in October 1941, and the most in 24 hours 1.93 inches or 49.0 millimeters on October 4, 1914. The most snowfall in one season has been 55.4 inches or 1.4 meters between July 1915 and June 1916, and the most during one month 28.3 inches or 0.72 meters in January 1957; in contrast, only a trace fell between July 1933 and June 1934.

Palisade falls within the USDA hardiness zone 7. The average window for freezing temperatures is October 22 to April 19, allowing a frost-free season of 187 days. On average 121 mornings each year fall to or below freezing, but 0 °F (−17.8 °C) is not reached in most winters and maxima top freezing on all but thirteen afternoons. During summer afternoons top 90 °F or 32.2 °C on 66 afternoons; however, 100 °F or 37.8 °C is reached only about half a dozen times each summer and only ten mornings stay above 68 °F or 20 °C. The coldest temperature recorded has been −23 °F or −30.6 °C on January 7, 1913 and the coldest maximum 3 °F (−16.1 °C) on January 12, 1963 and February 6, 1989, while the hottest recorded temperature is 111 °F or 43.9 °C on July 5, 1937. The hottest month has been July 2003 with a mean of 84.0 °F or 28.9 °C and a mean maximum of 100.5 °F (38.1 °C); the coldest has been January 1917 with a mean of 15.2 °F or −9.3 °C.

Climate data for Palisade 1991–2020 normals, extremes 1911–
Month	Jan	Feb	Mar	Apr	May	Jun	Jul	Aug	Sep	Oct	Nov	Dec	Year
Record high °F (°C)	64 (18)	74 (23)	84 (29)	90 (32)	98 (37)	110 (43)	111 (44)	106 (41)	101 (38)	92 (33)	79 (26)	69 (21)	111 (44)
Mean daily maximum °F (°C)	39.9 (4.4)	47.2 (8.4)	58.4 (14.7)	65.6 (18.7)	75.6 (24.2)	87.3 (30.7)	92.6 (33.7)	89.6 (32.0)	81.1 (27.3)	67.4 (19.7)	52.9 (11.6)	40.5 (4.7)	66.5 (19.2)
Mean daily minimum °F (°C)	20.7 (−6.3)	26.3 (−3.2)	34.5 (1.4)	40.4 (4.7)	49.7 (9.8)	58.5 (14.7)	64.8 (18.2)	62.9 (17.2)	54.5 (12.5)	41.6 (5.3)	30.9 (−0.6)	21.5 (−5.8)	42.2 (5.7)
Record low °F (°C)	−23 (−31)	−13 (−25)	4 (−16)	12 (−11)	27 (−3)	34 (1)	43 (6)	40 (4)	28 (−2)	11 (−12)	3 (−16)	−18 (−28)	−23 (−31)
Average precipitation inches (mm)	0.61 (15)	0.65 (17)	0.85 (22)	1.11 (28)	1.10 (28)	0.55 (14)	0.68 (17)	0.88 (22)	1.36 (35)	1.30 (33)	0.79 (20)	0.59 (15)	10.47 (266)
Average snowfall inches (cm)	4.1 (10)	2.5 (6.4)	1.2 (3.0)	0.4 (1.0)	0.0 (0.0)	0.0 (0.0)	0.0 (0.0)	0.0 (0.0)	0.0 (0.0)	0.3 (0.76)	1.0 (2.5)	3.4 (8.6)	12.9 (33)
Average precipitation days (≥ 0.01 in)	5.2	5.2	5.6	6.8	6.0	3.0	4.6	6.6	6.5	5.7	4.8	4.6	64.6
Average snowy days (≥ 0.1 in)	2.4	1.7	0.9	0.3	0.0	0.0	0.0	0.0	0.0	0.2	0.9	2.5	8.9
Source: NOAA

== Demographics ==
Historical population
Census	Pop.	Note	%±
1910	900		—
1920	855		−5.0%
1930	851		−0.5%
1940	855		0.5%
1950	861		0.7%
1960	860		−0.1%
1970	874		1.6%
1980	1,551		77.5%
1990	1,871		20.6%
2000	2,579		37.8%
2010	2,692		4.4%
2020	2,565		−4.7%
U.S. Decennial Census

=== 2020 census ===
As of the 2020 census, Palisade had a population of 2,565. The median age was 45.1 years. 18.0% of residents were under the age of 18 and 24.4% of residents were 65 years of age or older. For every 100 females there were 100.4 males, and for every 100 females age 18 and over there were 95.9 males age 18 and over.

100.0% of residents lived in urban areas, while 0.0% lived in rural areas.

There were 1,185 households in Palisade, of which 25.1% had children under the age of 18 living in them. Of all households, 40.4% were married-couple households, 22.2% were households with a male householder and no spouse or partner present, and 29.9% were households with a female householder and no spouse or partner present. About 36.1% of all households were made up of individuals and 18.4% had someone living alone who was 65 years of age or older.

There were 1,254 housing units, of which 5.5% were vacant. The homeowner vacancy rate was 0.5% and the rental vacancy rate was 6.8%.

Racial composition as of the 2020 census
Race	Number	Percent
White	2,175	84.8%
Black or African American	9	0.4%
American Indian and Alaska Native	24	0.9%
Asian	27	1.1%
Native Hawaiian and Other Pacific Islander	3	0.1%
Some other race	120	4.7%
Two or more races	207	8.1%
Hispanic or Latino (of any race)	304	11.9%

=== 2000 census ===
As of the census of 2000, there were 2,579 people, 1,051 households, and 689 families residing in the town. The population density was 2,399.5 inhabitants per square mile (926.5/km^{2}). There were 1,117 housing units at an average density of 1,039.3 units per square mile (401.3 units/km^{2}). The racial makeup of the town was 93.91% White, 0.19% African American, 1.05% Native American, 0.50% Asian, 0.27% Pacific Islander, 1.36% from other races, and 2.71% from two or more races. Hispanic or Latino of any race were 6.24% of the population.

There were 1,051 households, out of which 30.5% had children under the age of 18 living with them, 49.8% were married couples living together, 12.0% had a female householder with no husband present, and 34.4% were non-families. 29.5% of all households were made up of individuals, and 12.9% had someone living alone who was 65 years of age or older. The average household size was 2.35 and the average family size was 2.91.

In the town, the population was spread out, with 24.3% under the age of 18, 7.6% from 18 to 24, 26.5% from 25 to 44, 21.5% from 45 to 64, and 20.2% who were 65 years of age or older. The median age was 40 years. For every 100 females, there were 87.8 males. For every 100 females age 18 and over, there were 85.3 males.

The median income for a household in the town was $27,739, and the median income for a family was $31,797. Males had a median income of $28,231 versus $21,875 for females. The per capita income for the town was $15,539. About 11.0% of families and 14.0% of the population were below the poverty line, including 21.2% of those under age 18 and 10.7% of those age 65 or over.

== Education ==
Palisade has one high school, Palisade High School. It also has one elementary school, Taylor Elementary. Mount Garfield Middle School is located on the border of Clifton and Palisade.

== Notable people ==
- Clair Finch, Wisconsin state legislator and lawyer
- Gordon Swann, geologist for the Apollo 14 and Apollo 15 lunar landings – the asteroid 4082 Swann is named after him
- Rena Mary Taylor, state legislator

== See also ==
- List of municipalities in Colorado
