= Trail of the Mountain Spirits Scenic Byway =

Colorado Scenic and Historic Byway

Trail of the Mountain Spirits Scenic Byway

Route information
- Maintained by NMDOT
- Length: 95 mi (153 km)
- Existed: 2021–present

Major junctions
- South end: US 180 Silver City or NM 35 / NM 152 San Lorenzo
- North end: NM 15 Gila Cliff Dwellings National Monument

Location
- Country: United States
- State: New Mexico
- Counties: Grant, Catron

Highway system
- Scenic Byways; National; National Forest; BLM; NPS; New Mexico State Highway System; Interstate; US; State; Scenic

The Trail of the Mountain Spirits Scenic Byway is a 95-mile (153 km) National Scenic Byway and New Mexico State Byway located in Grant and Catron counties in New Mexico.
