= Black River National Forest Scenic Byway =

Road in Gogebic County, Michigan, United States

Black River National Forest Scenic Byway
- County Road 513
- Black River NFSB highlighted in red

Route information
- Maintained by GCRC and USFS
- Length: 11.328 mi (18.231 km)
- Existed: June 20, 1992–present

Major junctions
- South end: CR 204 near Bessemer
- North end: Black River Harbor

Location
- Country: United States
- State: Michigan
- County: Gogebic

Highway system
- Scenic Byways; National; National Forest; BLM; NPS; Gogebic County Roads

The Black River National Forest Scenic Byway is a National Forest Scenic Byway that runs along the Black River in the Ottawa National Forest in the U.S. state of Michigan. The byway follows County Road 513 (CR 513) through Gogebic County in the Upper Peninsula. As a county road, it is maintained jointly by the Gogebic County Road Commission (GCRC) with assistance from the U.S. Forest Service (USFS). The byway provides access to several waterfalls and other visitor attractions in the area. The route of the byway first existed as a wagon road in the 1840s and as a county road in the 1920s. The byway designation was instituted on June 20, 1992, and the byway was dedicated later that year.

== Route description ==
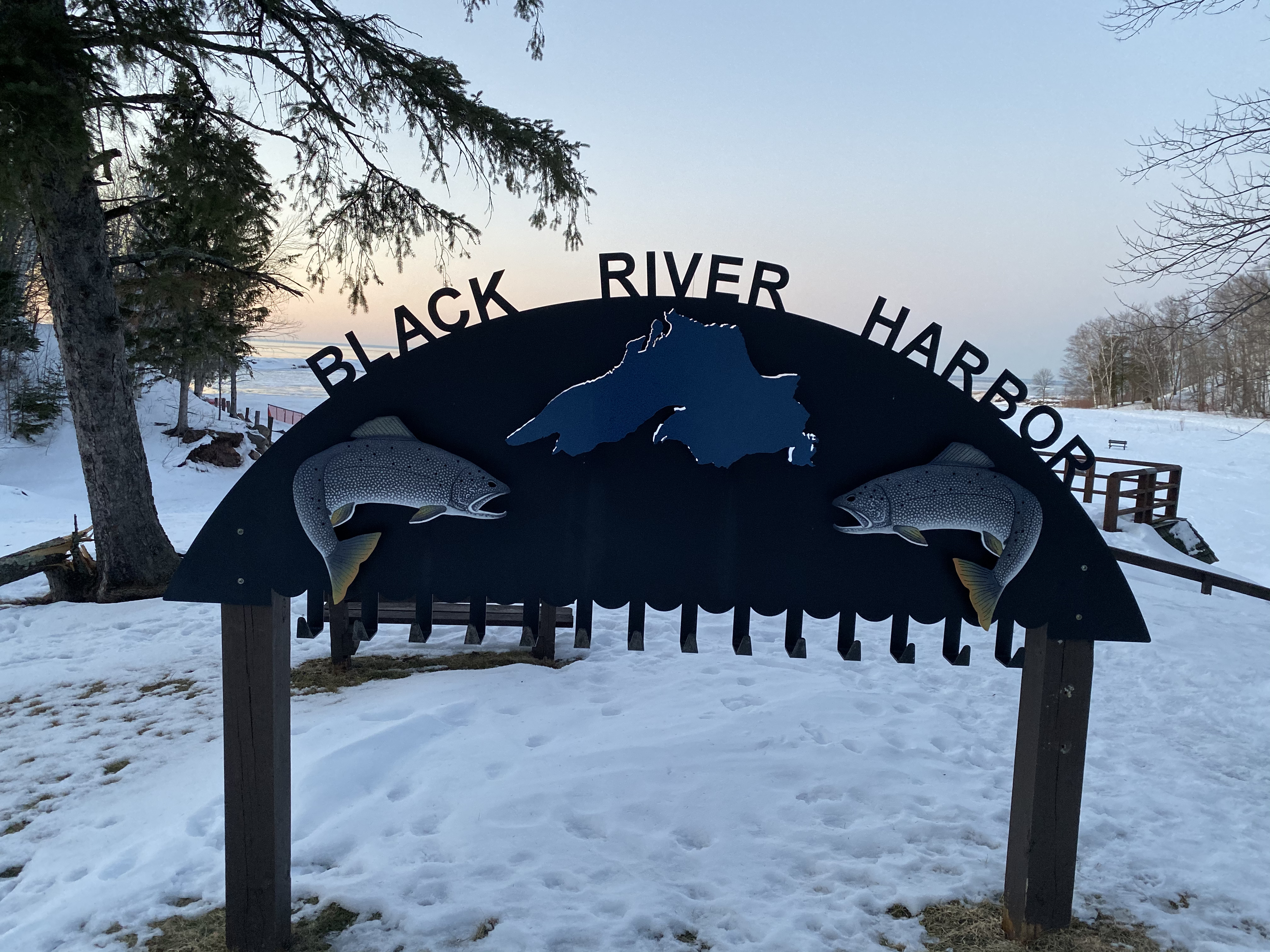
Black River Harbor, located at the end of the byway

While CR 513 (Black River Road) extends further south to connect with US Highway 2 near Bessemer, the National Forest Scenic Byway designation starts at the intersection with CR 204 (Airport Road) west of the Gogebic-Iron County Airport and north of the Big Powderhorn Mountain. From this southern starting point, the roadway runs northward along the Black River through the Ottawa National Forest. CR 513 runs along the western side of the river, staying shy of the banks as it passes through the woods. The woods through which the roadway passes contain pine, hemlock, and hardwood trees. The Royal Palm Ranch, a nationally known equestrian school, is located along the road on 100 acres (40 ha) of land next to the river. The byway curves away from the river near Copper Peak, the tallest ski flying hill in the world. The 18-story facility allows visitors on clear enough days to see 85 miles (137 km) in the distance to places like Minnesota, Isle Royale and Canada.

North of Copper Peak, the road once again roughly parallels the river, but stays away from the river's course. The road provides access to five sets of waterfalls. The first is Great Conglomerate Falls, followed by Potawatomi, Gorge, Sandstone, and Rainbow Falls. The falls are connected to the road by four separate hiking trails. The byway continues past these landmarks before terminating at Black River Harbor. The harbor is the site of a 1920s fishing village, one of only two harbors in the National Forest System. The area was also host to three taverns built by the Civilian Conservation Corps during the Great Depression and a pedestrian suspension bridge used by the North Country Trail to cross the mouth of the river.

== History ==
According to the surveys of William A. Burt in 1848, a wagon road ran south from the modern site of the Black River Harbor to Chippewa Hill, the location of Copper Peak. A wagon road was built by the State of Michigan in 1904 to connect the waterfront with Bessemer. The county had purchased the land around the waterfront in 1924 for a park, and a county road running parallel to the Black River was in place by 1927. The residents of the fishing village were forced to move and settled at Black River Village. The roadway was improved to a gravel surface by 1930, and fully paved in late 1949 or early 1950. In 1967, the Gogebic County exchanged the park land along the river, including the harbor, with the USFS for other land in the area, and the harbor has been under federal maintenance since. Local officials originally proposed the National Forest Scenic Byway designation for the road in April 1991. The desire was to "showcase a special part of the National Forest" and boost tourism to the area, according to the park ranger in charge of handling the application. The designation was conferred by the USFS on June 20, 1992, with a dedication ceremony on September 19 that year.

== Major intersections ==
The entire road is in Ironwood Township, Gogebic County.

mi	km	Destinations	Notes
0.000	0.000	CR 204 west (Airport Road) CR 513 south (Black River Road)	Roadway continues southward as Black River Road
11.328	18.231	Black River Harbor	
1.000 mi = 1.609 km; 1.000 km = 0.621 mi

== See also ==
- River Road National Scenic Byway, another National Forest Scenic Byway in Michigan
- Whitefish Bay National Forest Scenic Byway, the other National Forest Scenic Byway in the Upper Peninsula
