= White Mountain Trail =

Scenic Byway in New Hampshire

White Mountain Trail National Forest Scenic Byway

Route information
- Maintained by NHDOT
- Length: 100 mi (160 km)

Location
- Country: United States
- State: New Hampshire

Highway system
- Scenic Byways; National; National Forest; BLM; NPS; New Hampshire Highway System; Interstate; US; State; Turnpikes

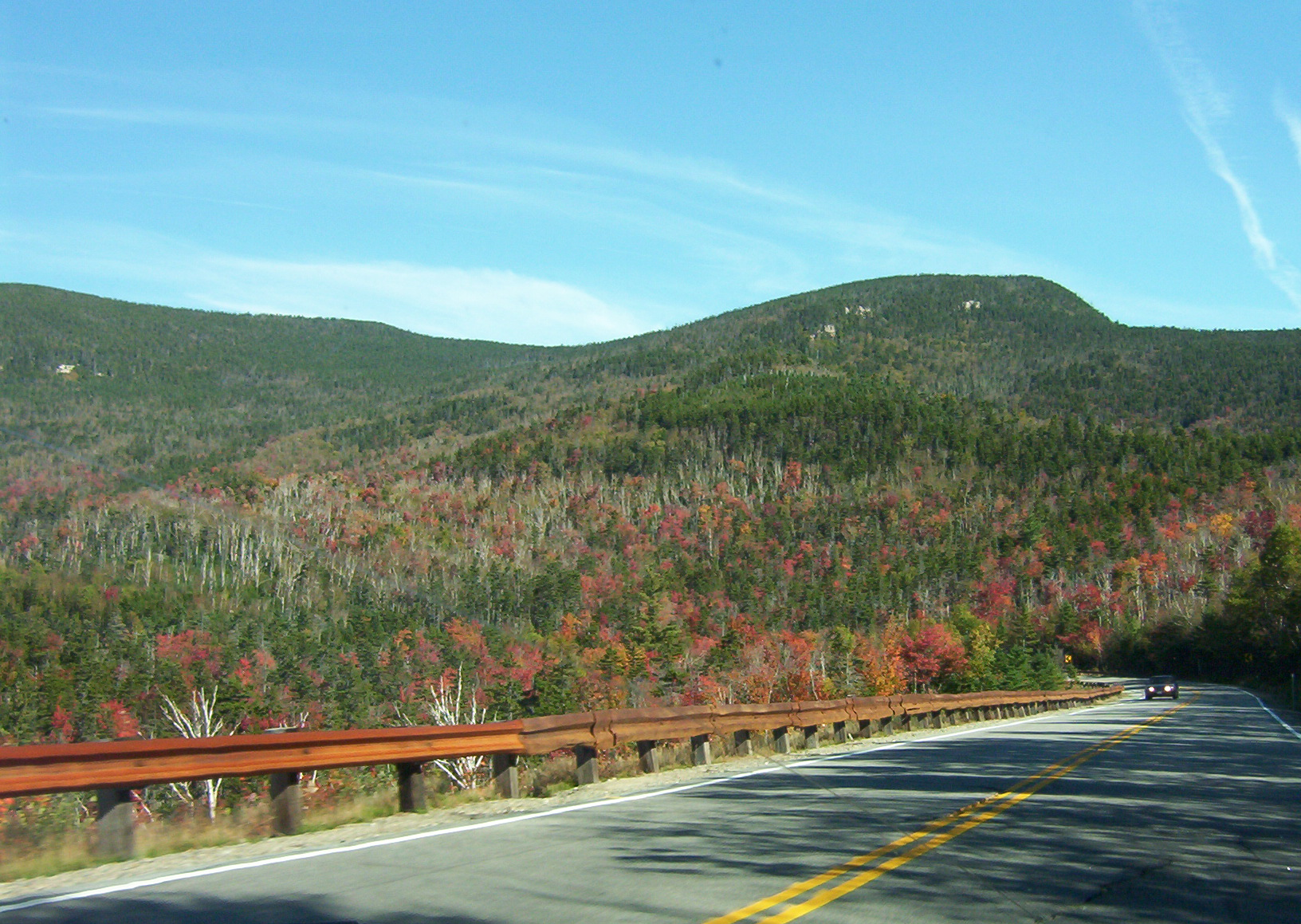
The Kancamagus Highway is a component of the White Mountain Trail.

The White Mountain Trail is a National Scenic Byway in the U.S. state of New Hampshire. It travels through the heart of the White Mountains crossing three major mountain passes. Despite the name it is a scenic byway accessible by car and not a hiking trail.

The trail includes sections of U.S. Route 3 and US 302, between Lincoln and Conway, connecting at both ends with the Kancamagus Highway (part of New Hampshire Route 112). It also includes a branch which travels south from Bartlett to the Kancamagus over Bear Notch. The byway is primarily in the White Mountain National Forest but also traverses Franconia Notch State Park and Crawford Notch State Park. The White Mountain Trail was designated on June 9, 1998, and is approximately 100 miles (160 km) long.
