= National Scenic Byway =

United States category of road

National Scenic Byways Program
- Highway marker

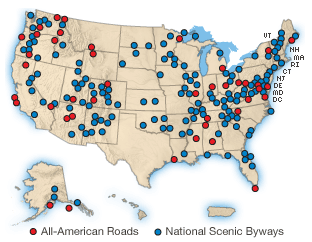
- All-American Roads highlighted with red dots, National Scenic Byways with blue dots

System information
- Formed: 1991

Highway names
- Interstates: Interstate nn (I-nn)
- US Highways: U.S. Highway nn, U.S. Route nn (US nn)
- State: Varies by state

System links
- Scenic Byways; National; National Forest; BLM; NPS

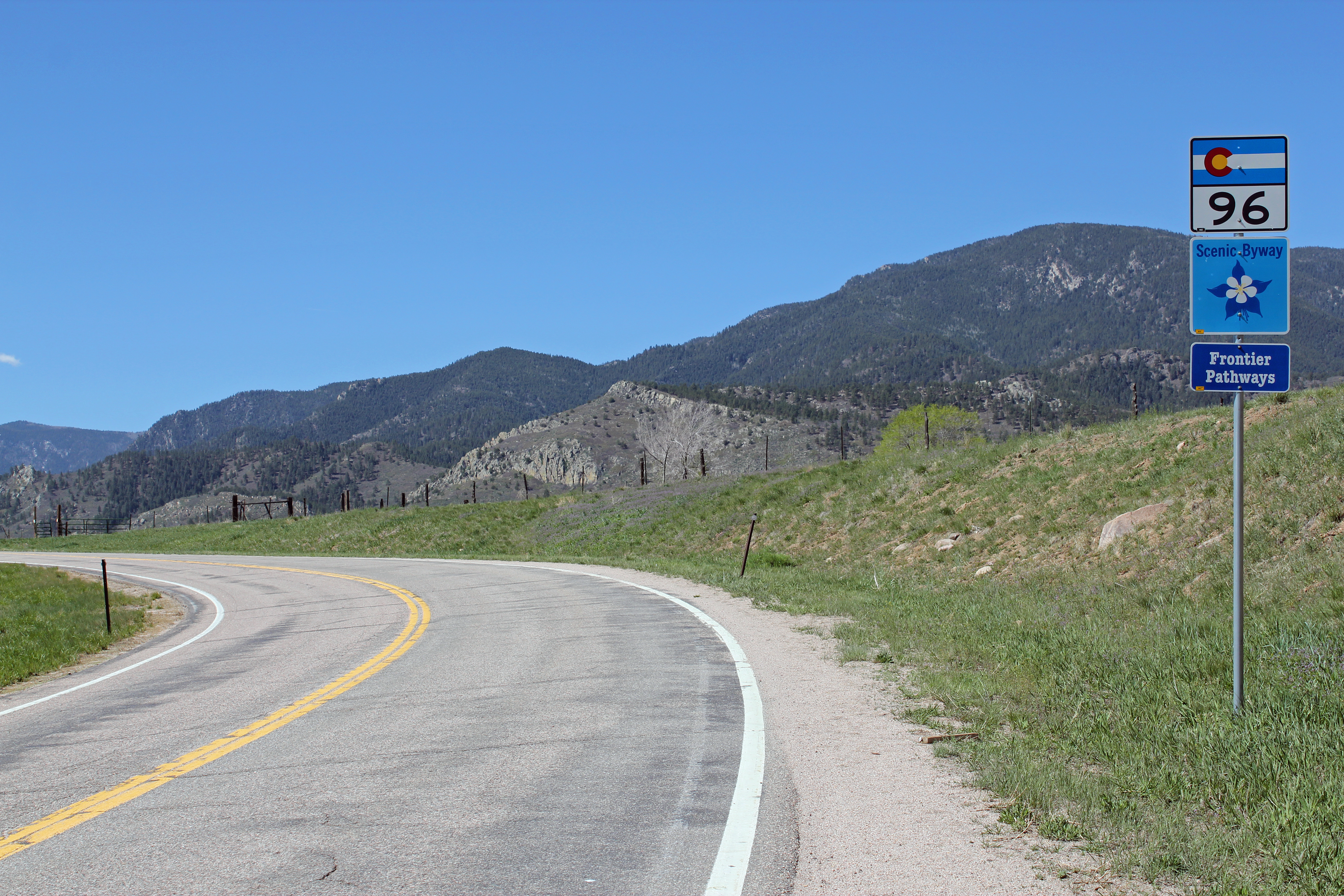
The Frontier Pathways National Scenic and Historic Byway as it passes through Wetmore, Custer County, Colorado

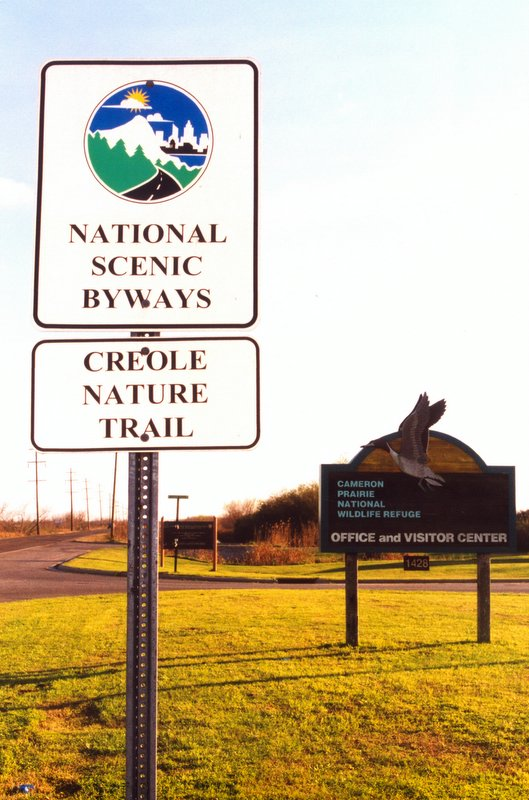
A sign indicating the National Scenic Byway designation for the Creole Nature Trail

A National Scenic Byway is a road recognized by the United States Department of Transportation (USDOT) for one or more of six "intrinsic qualities": archeological, cultural, historic, natural, recreational, and scenic. The program was established by Congress in 1991 to preserve and protect the nation's scenic but often less-traveled roads and promote tourism and economic development. The National Scenic Byways Program (NSBP) is administered by the Federal Highway Administration (FHWA).

Some scenic byways are designated All-American Roads, which must meet two out of the six intrinsic qualities. The designation means they have features that do not exist elsewhere in the United States and are unique and important enough to be tourist destinations unto themselves. As of January 21, 2021, there are 184 National Scenic Byways located in 48 states (all except Hawaii and Texas).

== History ==
The NSBP was established under the Intermodal Surface Transportation Efficiency Act of 1991, which provided $74.3 million in discretionary grants. On May 18, 1995, FHWA specified the intrinsic qualities that would serve as criteria for designating road as National Scenic Byways or All-American Roads. In September 1998, Secretary Federico Peña announced the first 14 National Scenic Byways and six All-American Roads. On June 9, 1998, the Transportation Equity Act for the 21st Century (TEA-21) provided $148 million to states so they could develop state roads to take advantage of the program.

On August 10, 2005, President George W. Bush signed the Safe, Accountable, Flexible, Efficient Transportation Equity Act: A Legacy for Users (SAFETEA-LU), which provided $175 million to states and Indian tribes. On October 16, 2009, U.S. Transportation Secretary Ray LaHood designated 37 new roads as National Scenic Byways and five new All-American Roads. The U.S. Department of Transportation approved the designation on January 19, 2021, of 34 new roads as National Scenic Byways, in addition to 15 new All-American Roads.

== Requirements ==
National Scenic Byways go through a nomination procedure. They must already be designated state scenic byways to be nominated (However, roads that meet all criteria for national designation but not state designation may be considered for national designation on a case-by-case basis).

=== Intrinsic qualities ===
For designation as a National Scenic Byway a road must have one of six intrinsic qualities. To be designated an All-American Road, a road must have at least two of the six qualities.

- Scenic quality is the heightened visual experience derived from the view of natural and manmade elements of the visual environment of the scenic byway corridor. The characteristics of the landscape are strikingly distinct and offer a pleasing and most memorable visual experience.
- Natural quality applies to those features in the visual environment that are in a relatively undisturbed state. These features predate the arrival of human populations and may include geological formations, fossils, landform, water bodies, vegetation, and wildlife. There may be evidence of human activity, but the natural features reveal minimal disturbances.
- Historic quality encompasses legacies of the past that are distinctly associated with physical elements of the landscape, whether natural or manmade, that are of such historic significance that they educate the viewer and stir an appreciation for the past. The historic elements reflect the actions of people and may include buildings, settlement patterns, and other examples of human activity.
- Cultural quality is evidence and expressions of the customs or traditions of a distinct group of people. Cultural features include, but are not limited to, crafts, music, dance, rituals, festivals, speech, food, special events, or vernacular architecture.
- Archeological quality involves those characteristics of the scenic byways corridor that are physical evidence of historic or prehistoric human life or activity. The scenic byway corridor's archeological interest, as identified through ruins, artifacts, structural remains, and other physical evidence have scientific significance that educate the viewer and stir an appreciation for the past.
- Recreational quality involves outdoor recreational activities directly associated with and dependent upon the natural and cultural elements of the corridor's landscape. The recreational activities provide opportunities for active and passive recreational experiences. They include, but are not limited to, downhill skiing, rafting, boating, fishing, and hiking. Driving the road itself may qualify as a pleasurable recreational experience. The recreational activities may be seasonal, but the quality and importance of the recreational activities as seasonal operations must be well recognized.

=== Corridor management plans ===
A corridor management plan must also be developed, with community involvement, and the plan "should provide for the conservation and enhancement of the byway's intrinsic qualities as well as the promotion of tourism and economic development". The plan includes, but is not limited to:

- A map identifying the corridor boundaries and the location of intrinsic qualities and different land uses within the corridor.
- A strategy for maintaining and enhancing those intrinsic qualities.
- A strategy describing how existing development might be enhanced and new development might be accommodated while still preserving the intrinsic qualities of the corridor.
- A general review of the road's or highway's safety and accident record to identify any correctable faults in highway design, maintenance, or operations.
- A signage plan that demonstrates how the State will insure and make the number and placement of signs more supportive of the visitor experience.
- A narrative describing how the National Scenic Byway will be positioned for marketing.

Corridor management plans for All-American Roads must also include:

- A narrative on how the All-American Road would be promoted, interpreted, and marketed in order to attract travelers, especially those from other countries.
- A plan to encourage the accommodation of increased tourism, if this is projected. Some demonstration that the roadway, lodging and dining facilities, roadside rest areas, and other tourist necessities will be adequate for the number of visitors induced by the byway's designation as an All-American Road.
- A plan for addressing multi-lingual information needs.

The final step is when the highway (or highways) is approved for designation by the United States secretary of transportation.

== List of byways ==
Type	Name	Length (mi)	Length (km)	State(s)	Southern or western terminus	Northern or eastern terminus	Date designated	Description	Intrinsic qualities	Ref(s)
AAR	A1A Scenic and Historic Coastal Byway	72.0	115.9	Florida	Gamble Rogers Memorial State Recreation Area	SR 202 in Ponte Vedra Beach	June 13, 2002 (NSB); February 16, 2021 (AAR)	Follows Atlantic coast barrier islands	Recreational, Historic	
AAR	Acadia All-American Road	40.0	64.4	Maine	Entirety of the Park Loop Road in Acadia National Park	Ellsworth–Trenton town line on SR 3	June 15, 2000	Scenic drive providing access to the coastal mountains of Acadia National Park	Recreational, Scenic	
NSB	Alabama's Coastal Connection	130.0	209.2	Alabama	I-10 and Grand Bay Wilmer Road north of Grand Bay	I-10 and US 98 south of Spanish Fort	October 16, 2009	Scenic and historic drive along Alabama's Gulf Coast	Scenic	
AAR	Alaska's Marine Highway	3,500.0	5,632.7	Alaska	Ferry terminal in Unalaska	Ferry terminal in Metlakatla (with ferry connections to Prince Rupert, BC and Bellingham, WA)	June 13, 2002 (NSB); September 22, 2005 (AAR)	Ferry system connecting Alaskan coastal communities	Scenic, Cultural, Natural	
NSB	Amish Country Byway	76.2	122.6	Ohio	SR 39 in Loudonville; US 62 near Brinkhaven	US 62 near Wilmot; SR 39 near Sugarcreek	June 13, 2002	Route forms a double loop through the pastoral countryside of eastern Ohio's Amish communities	Cultural	
NSB	Arroyo Seco Historic Parkway - I-110/SR 110	9.5	15.3	California	US 101 in downtown Los Angeles	Glenarm Street in Pasadena	June 13, 2002	The first freeway in the United States connects Los Angeles and Pasadena through the park-like landscape of the Arroyo Seco	Historic	
NSB	Ashley River Road	11.0	17.7	South Carolina	Mile marker 5.84 on SC 61	Mile marker 15.75 on SC 61	June 15, 2000	Traverses a historic plantation district along the Ashley River near Charleston	Historic	
NSB	Baltimore's Historic Charles Street	12.0	19.3	Maryland	Winder Street in South Baltimore	Bellona Avenue in Lutherville	October 16, 2009	Travels the entire length of historic Charles Street through downtown Baltimore	Historic	
NSB	Bayou Teche National Scenic Byway	183.8	295.8	Louisiana	LA 182 in Morgan City	LA 31 and LA 93 in Arnaudville	February 16, 2021	Follows the original course of the Mississippi along Bayou Teche, a culturally significant and scenic waterway in the Atchafalaya National Heritage Area	Cultural	
NSB	Bayshore Heritage Scenic Byway	142.0	228.5	New Jersey	Cape May Point State Park	CR 540 in Mannington	February 16, 2021	Traverses the coastal communities and wetlands of the Delaware Bay, a significant birding and migratory destination	Natural	
AAR	Beartooth Highway	68.7	110.6	Montana, Wyoming	Wyoming–Montana state line on US 212 near Cooke City	US 212 and MT 78 in Red Lodge	June 15, 2000; June 13, 2002 (extended in Montana)	Scenic high-elevation highway to Yellowstone National Park's northeast entrance	Natural, Scenic	
NSB	Big Bend Scenic Byway	220.0	354.1	Florida	Scipio Creek Marina in Apalachicola	St. Marks Light in St. Marks National Wildlife Refuge	October 16, 2009	Travels along hundreds of acres of wet prairie, wet flatwoods, strand swamp, and bottomland forest	Natural	
NSB	Billy the Kid Trail	84.0	135.2	New Mexico	NM 48 and Sudderth Drive in Ruidoso	US 70 and US 380 near Hondo	June 9, 1998	Loop through historic Old West towns in the rugged mountains of the Lincoln National Forest	Scenic	
AAR	Blue Ridge Parkway	469.0	754.8	North Carolina, Virginia	US 441 near Cherokee	US 250 near Waynesboro	September 19, 1996 (NC); September 22, 2005 (VA)	Scenic drive along America's longest linear park and the winding spine of the Blue Ridge Mountains	Historic, Scenic (NC); Recreational, Cultural (VA)	
NSB	Bold Coast Scenic Byway	147.0	236.6	Maine	Gouldsboro	Calais	February 16, 2021	Coastal route through Down East Maine to the Canadian border	Historic	
NSB	Boom or Bust Byway	137.0	220.5	Louisiana	LA 2 at the Louisiana-Texas state line	Lake Claiborne State Park	February 16, 2021	Explores the rural remnants of the oil and gas, lumber, transportation, farming, and entertainment industries of Ark-La-Tex and Northern Louisiana	Historic	
NSB	Brandywine Valley Scenic Byway	37.3	60.0	Delaware, Pennsylvania	King Street and 11th Street in downtown Wilmington	PA 162 near West Chester	September 22, 2005 (DE); February 16, 2021 (PA)	Historic drive along the Brandywine Creek through the "Chateau Country" of northern Delaware and southeastern Pennsylvania	Historic	
NSB	Cascade Lakes Scenic Byway	66	106	Oregon	Junction of OR 58 and Crescent Cutoff Road (NF-61) near Crescent Lake	Boundary between Deschutes National Forest and Bend on SW Century Drive	June 9, 1998	Traverses forested region of glacial lakes and volcanic mountains in Central Oregon	Scenic	
NSB	Cascade Loop	440	710	Washington	Whidbey Island; Everett; Stevens Pass	North Cascades National Park; Lake Chelan; Wenatchee	February 16, 2021	Loop around the Cascade Mountains, Columbia River in Central Washington, and the Skagit Valley	Scenic	
NSB	Cherohala Skyway	43.0	69.2	North Carolina, Tennessee	SR 165 in Tellico Plains	NC 143 in Robbinsville	September 19, 1996 (TN); June 9, 1998 (NC)	Ridgetop drive in the Appalachians	Scenic	
NSB	Cherokee Foothills Scenic Highway	112.0	180.2	South Carolina	I-85 west of Fair Play	SC 150 in Gaffney	June 9, 1998	Follows part of the historic Cherokee Path through the Blue Ridge Escarpment of Upstate South Carolina	Scenic	
NSB	Cherokee Hills Byway	84.0	135.2	Oklahoma	I-40 south of Gore	Oklahoma–Arkansas state line on US 412	October 16, 2009	Situated in the foothills of the Ozark Mountains, this route showcases eastern Oklahoma's tremendous natural diversity and rich Cherokee heritage	Cultural	
AAR	Chesapeake Country Scenic Byway	85.5	137.6	Maryland	MD 18 in Stevensville (southern spur) and MD 445 on Eastern Neck Island (northern spur)	Chesapeake & Delaware Canal on MD 213 in Chesapeake City	June 13, 2002 (NSB); February 16, 2021 (AAR)	Traverses the historic Eastern Shore of Chesapeake Bay	Cultural, Recreational	
AAR	Chinook Scenic Byway (Stephen Mather Memorial Parkway)	85.0	136.8	Washington	SR 164 and SR 169 in Enumclaw	US 12 near Naches	June 9, 1998	Scenic drive with dramatic views of Mount Rainier	Scenic	
NSB	City of Las Vegas, Las Vegas Boulevard State Scenic Byway	3.4	5.5	Nevada	Las Vegas Boulevard at Sahara Avenue; Las Vegas Strip	Las Vegas Boulevard at E Washington Avenue	June 15, 2000	Extensive displays of neon art between downtown and the Las Vegas Strip	Scenic	
NSB	Coal Heritage Trail	97.6	157.1	West Virginia	US 52 at the West Virginia-Virginia state line	WV 16 at I-77 in Beckley	June 9, 1998	Historic drive through coal-producing areas of southwestern West Virginia	Historic	
AAR	Colonial Parkway	23.0	37.0	Virginia	Historic Jamestowne Visitor Center in Jamestown	Yorktown Battlefield Visitor Center in Yorktown	September 22, 2005	Landscaped parkway connecting three Colonial-era historic sites	Natural, Historic	
NSB	Colorado River Headwaters Byway	69.0	111.0	Colorado	SH 131 and Trough Road south of Bond	US 34 and West Portal Road in Grand Lake	September 22, 2005	Follows the upper reaches of the Colorado River past alpine reservoirs, lush ranchlands, and dramatic canyon landscapes	Historic	
NSB	Connecticut River Byway	498.7	802.6	Massachusetts, New Hampshire, Vermont	Route 116 and Route 47 in South Hadley	VT 114 at US 3 in West Stewartstown	September 22, 2005 (NH, VT); October 16, 2009 (MA)	Scenic drive on both sides of New England's longest river	Historic	
NSB	Connecticut State Route 169	32.0	51.5	Connecticut	Route 138 in Lisbon	Connecticut–Massachusetts state line on Route 169	September 19, 1996	Scenic and historic route through one of the last unspoiled areas in New England	Scenic	
NSB	Copper Country Trail	47.0	75.6	Michigan	Portage Lake Lift Bridge in Hancock	M-26 in Copper Harbor	September 22, 2005	Follows US 41 and traverses an area developed for copper mining	Historic	
NSB	Coronado Trail Scenic Byway	123.0	197.9	Arizona	US 191 and Burro Alley in Morenci	US 180 and Main Street in Springerville	September 22, 2005	Scenic drive from the Chihuahuan Desert to the Colorado Plateau, crossing the Mogollon Rim in Apache-Sitgreaves National Forest	Scenic	
NSB	Coulee Corridor Scenic Byway	150.0	241.4	Washington	SR 26 and SR 17 near Othello	SR 155 and US 97 in Omak	September 22, 2005	Passes through coulees and the Channeled Scablands formed by receding glaciers	Natural	
NSB	Country Music Highway	144.1	231.9	Kentucky	US 119 near Whitesburg	KY 2 in Greenup	June 13, 2002	Backwoods drive commemorating eastern Kentucky's cultural heritage	Cultural	
AAR	Creole Nature Trail	180.0	289.7	Louisiana	LA 27 in Sulphur; LA 82 at Sabine Pass	LA 27 and LA 385 in Lake Charles; LA 82 near the Rockefeller Wildlife Refuge	September 19, 1996 (NSB); June 13, 2002 (AAR)	Meanders through the marshes, prairies, and coastal region of Acadiana in southwestern Louisiana	Cultural, Natural	
NSB	Crowley's Ridge Parkway	212.0	341.2	Arkansas, Missouri	Helena Bridge on US 49 near Helena–West Helena	J Street and Route 25 near Malden	June 9, 1998 (AR); June 15, 2000 (MO)	Scenic and historic drive along Crowley's Ridge through the Mississippi Embayment and the Missouri Bootheel	Natural	
NSB	Cumberland Historic Byway	156.0	251.1	Tennessee	SR 52 at the Cumberland River in Celina	SR 63 at US 25E near Cumberland Gap National Historical Park	February 16, 2021	Winds through the hidden frontier of the Cumberland Plateau	Historic	
NSB	Death Valley Scenic Byway	81.5	131.2	California	Death Valley National Park west entrance on SR 190	Death Valley National Park east entrance on SR 190	June 9, 1998; June 13, 2002 (extended)	Scenic drive through the expansive desert basin of the lowest place in North America	Scenic	
NSB	Delaware Bayshore Byway	157.0	252.7	Delaware	Lewes	New Castle	January 19, 2021	Scenic and historic drive along the Delaware Bay and Delaware River in Delaware	Historic	
NSB	Delaware River Scenic Byway	32.8	52.8	New Jersey	I-195/I-295 in Hamilton Township	Trenton Avenue and Route 12 in Frenchtown	October 16, 2009	Scenic and historic drive along the Delaware River in central New Jersey	Historic	
NSB	Dinosaur Diamond Prehistoric Highway	480.0	772.5	Colorado, Utah	US 191 in Price; US 191 in Moab	US 40/US 191 in Vernal; SH 139 between Rangely and Loma	June 13, 2002	Loop through the northern Colorado Plateau, passing many dinosaur fossil sites and museums	Natural	
NSB	Door County Coastal Byway	67.1	108.0	Wisconsin	WIS 57 and WIS 42 in Sturgeon Bay	WIS 42 in Northport	February 16, 2021	Loop along the coast of Green Bay and Lake Michigan, through the forests and Niagara Escarpment of Door County	Natural	
NSB	East Tennessee Crossing Byway	83.0	133.6	Tennessee	North Carolina–Tennessee state line on US 25 near Del Rio	Tennessee–Kentucky state line on US 25E near Cumberland Gap	October 16, 2009	Explores the historic trails, cultural heritage, and recreational opportunities of East Tennessee's Appalachian backcountry	Historic	
NSB	Eastern Sierra Scenic Byway	245.0	394.3	California	U.S. Route 395 just north of Pearsonville	U.S. Route 395 in Topaz	October 16, 2008	Scenic route past natural landmarks like the Inyo National Forest, Sierra Nevada mountains, Sequoia National Forest, Mono Lake, and the Owens Valley	Scenic	
NSB	Ebbetts Pass Scenic Byway	61.0	98.2	California	SR 4 in Arnold	SR 89 near Markleeville	September 22, 2005	Traverses the high-alpine Sierra Nevada through Ebbetts Pass, with access to the northernmost groves of giant sequoia	Scenic	
NSB	Edge of the Wilderness	47.0	75.6	Minnesota	US 2 in Grand Rapids	MN 1 in Effie	September 19, 1996	Scenic drive through forests and rollings hills of the Minnesota Northwoods	Natural	
NSB	Edisto Island National Scenic Byway	16.8	27.0	South Carolina	Palmetto Boulevard and SC 174 in Edisto Beach	Dawhoo Bridge on SC 174	October 16, 2009	Scenic drive through salt marshes and live oak forests in the South Carolina Lowcountry	Scenic	
NSB	El Camino Real	299.0	481.2	New Mexico	NM 273 at the Rio Grande in Sunland Park	NM 74 in Ohkay Owingeh	June 9, 1998; September 22, 2005 (extended)	Historic north–south route through the Rio Grande Valley of central New Mexico	Historic	
NSB	The Energy Loop: Huntington/Eccles Canyons Scenic Byway	85.9	138.2	Utah	SR 31 in Huntington; SR 31 in Fairview	US 6 in Colton	June 15, 2000	Scenic route comprising historic towns, coal mining operations, and Manti–La Sal National Forest	Scenic	
NSB	Flaming Gorge-Uintas Scenic Byway	82.0	132.0	Utah	US 191 in Vernal	SR 44 in Manila; US 191 at the Utah-Wyoming state line	June 9, 1998	Scenic drive through the Uinta Mountains and Flaming Gorge National Recreation Area	Natural	
AAR	Flaming Gorge-Green River Basin Scenic Byway	96.0	154.5	Wyoming	WYO 530 at the Wyoming-Utah state line; US 191 at the Wyoming-Utah state line	WY 530 in Green River; US 191 at I-80 in Purple Sage	February 16, 2021	Parallel routes through high desert and redrock country on either side of the Flaming Gorge	Natural, Recreational	
NSB	Flint Hills Scenic Byway	48.0	77.2	Kansas	I-35 near Cassoday	US 56 in Council Grove	September 22, 2005	Scenic drive through the Flint Hills and some of the last remaining tallgrass prairie in North America	Scenic	
NSB	Florida Black Bear Scenic Byway	123.0	197.9	Florida	SR 19 at National Forest boundary; SR 40 in Silver Springs	SR 19 at National Forest boundary; SR 40 at I-95 in Ormond Beach	October 16, 2009	Route connecting natural springs, pine forests, and endangered species' habitats in Ocala National Forest	Natural	
AAR	Florida Keys Scenic Highway	106.5	171.4	Florida	Mile marker 0 on US 1 in Key West	Jewfish Creek Bridge on Key Largo	October 16, 2009 (AAR)	Scenic route across a system of open ocean bridges connecting the numerous tropical islands of the Florida Keys	Recreational, Scenic	
NSB	Forest Heritage National Scenic Byway	17.6	28.3	North Carolina	Junction of US 276 and US 64	US 276 at the Pigeon River near the Shining Rock Wilderness	October 16, 2009	Rural route through the Cradle of Forestry in Pisgah National Forest	Historic	
NSB	Frontier Pathways Scenic and Historic Byway	103.0	165.8	Colorado	SH 96 in Westcliffe	El Pueblo History Museum in Pueblo;	June 9, 1998	Follows the paths of early explorers through the Sangre de Cristo Mountains	Scenic	
NSB	The George Parks Highway Scenic Byway	203.0	326.7	Alaska	Chulitna River Bridge in Denali State Park	Steese Highway in Fairbanks	October 16, 2009	Wilderness route stretching from the Alaska Range through the interior of Alaska	Natural	
AAR	George Washington Memorial Parkway	25.0	40.2	Virginia, Washington, D.C.	SR 235 in Mount Vernon	I-495 near McLean	September 22, 2005	Landscaped greenway connecting national memorials and historic sites along the Potomac River, across from the nation's capital	Natural, Historic	
NSB	Geronimo Trail Scenic Byway	154.0	247.8	New Mexico	NM 152 in San Lorenzo; NM 59 at Beaverhead station in Gila National Forest	Geronimo Trail Interpretive Center in Truth or Consequences	September 22, 2005	Scenic drive past hot springs, mining towns, and traditional lands of the Apache in southwestern New Mexico	Historic	
NSB	Glenn Highway	135.0	217.3	Alaska	Gambell Street in Anchorage	Lake Louise Road near Mendeltna	June 13, 2002	Terrain shaped by receding glaciers	Scenic	
NSB	Gold Belt Tour Scenic and Historic Byway	135.0	217.3	Colorado	US 50 in Florence	Florissant	June 15, 2000	Follows stage and rail routes to historic gold mining locations	Historic	
NSB	Grand Mesa Scenic and Historic Byway	63.0	101.4	Colorado	SH 65 in Cedaredge; Lands End Observatory on FS 100	Junction of SH 65 and I-70	September 19, 1996	Climbs from the Colorado River in the Grand Valley to the Grand Mesa, the largest flat-topped mountain in	Historic	
NSB	Grand Rounds National Scenic Byway	52.0	83.7	Minnesota	Loop route	Northeast spur trail to Cross Golf Course	June 9, 1998	Continuous parkway surrounding Minneapolis	Recreational	
NSB	Great Lakes Seaway Trail	518.0	833.6	New York, Pennsylvania	Ohio–Pennsylvania state line on US 20 west of Erie, Pennsylvania	Seaway International Bridge near Massena, New York	September 19, 1996 (NY); September 22, 2005 (PA)	Scenic drive along the shores of Lake Erie, Lake Ontario, and the St. Lawrence River	Historic	
AAR	Great River Road	2,069.0	3,329.7	Arkansas, Illinois, Iowa, Kentucky, Louisiana, Minnesota, Mississippi, Missouri, Tennessee, Wisconsin	LA 23 in Venice, Louisiana	Itasca State Park north of Park Rapids, Minnesota	June 15, 2000 (IL, IA, MN, WI); June 13, 2002 (AR); September 22, 2005 (MS); October 16, 2009 (TN)	Numerous scenic, historic, and culturally significant roadways paralleling the entire length of the Mississippi River from its headwaters to the Gulf of Mexico	Historic, Cultural, Scenic, Natural	
NSB	Gunflint Trail Scenic Byway	57.0	91.7	Minnesota	North Shore Scenic Drive in Grand Marais	Trails End near Sea Gull Lake	October 16, 2009	Scenic drive through the Superior National Forest	Natural	
NSB	Haines Highway-Valley of the Eagles	44.0	70.8	Alaska	AK 7 at the Canadian border	Ferry terminal in Haines	October 16, 2009	Route through the Chilkat River valley, a migratory site for the world's largest congregation of bald eagles	Natural	
AAR	Harriet Tubman Underground Railroad Byway	144.0	231.7	Maryland	Rosehill Place and Byrn Street in Cambridge	Maryland–Delaware state line on MD 287 near Goldsboro	October 16, 2009	Threads together numerous historic sites in the Delmarva Peninsula commemorating Harriet Tubman and the Underground Railroad	Cultural, Historic	
AAR	Hells Canyon Scenic Byway	218.4	351.5	Oregon	OR 86 and I-84 near Baker City	OR 82 and I-84 in La Grande	June 15, 2000	Provides views of Hells Canyon on the Snake River	Natural, Scenic	
NSB	Highland Scenic Highway	43.0	69.2	West Virginia	WV 39 in Fenwick	Junction of WV 150 and US 219	September 19, 1996	Scenic drive through mountains and valleys	Natural	
NSB	Historic Bluff Country Scenic Byway	88.0	141.6	Minnesota	MN 16 and US 14 / Great River Road in La Crescent	MN 16 and I-90 in Dexter	June 13, 2002	Historic and scenic drive through southeastern Minnesota	Scenic	
AAR	Historic Columbia River Highway	70.0	112.7	Oregon	Crown Point Highway east of Troutdale (western section); US 30 and I-84 in Mosier (eastern section)	I-84 near the Bonneville Dam (western section); US 30 and Hostetler Way in The Dalles (eastern section)	June 9, 1998	America's oldest scenic highway exists in two discontinuous sections which follow historic routes through the Columbia River Gorge	Historic, Scenic	
AAR	Historic National Road	824.2	1,326.4	Illinois, Indiana, Maryland, Ohio, Pennsylvania, West Virginia	Eads Bridge in East St. Louis	Lombard Street in downtown Baltimore	June 9, 1998 (IN); June 15, 2000 (IL); June 13, 2002 (AAR, all states)	Travels the route of the nation's first federally funded interstate highway along a historic corridor to the American Midwest	Cultural, Historic	
AAR	Historic Route 66	1,408.6	2,266.9	Arizona, Missouri, New Mexico, Oklahoma (AAR); California, Illinois (NSB)	Main Street in Barstow	Lakeshore Drive and Jackson Boulevard in Chicago	June 15, 2000 (AZ, IL, NM, OK); February 16, 2021 (CA, MO)	Historic "Mother Road" linking Chicago to Los Angeles	Historic, Natural, Cultural	
NSB	Hocking Hills Scenic Byway	30.0	48.3	Ohio	SR 56 and SR 374 near South Bloomingville	US 33 and SR 374 near Rockbridge	February 16, 2021	Scenic route through the forested and geologically varied Hocking Hills	Recreational	
NSB	Illinois River Road (Route of the Voyageurs)	291.0	468.3	Illinois	Water Street and US 136 in Havana	Reddick Mansion in Ottawa	September 22, 2005	A loop through the scenic Illinois River Valley with routes along both sides of the upper Illinois River	Natural	
NSB	Indian River Lagoon National Scenic Byway	150.0	241.4	Florida	US 1 and 85th Street in Wabasso	US 1 and Kennedy Parkway near Oak Hill	June 13, 2002	Series of connected loops providing access to the most biodiverse lagoon ecosystem in the northern hemisphere, as well as Kennedy Space Center and Cape Canaveral	Natural	
NSB	Indiana's Historic Pathways	250.0	402.3	Indiana	US 50 at the Ohio state line near Lawrenceburg; US 150 at Falls of the Ohio State Park in Clarksville	US 50 at the Wabash River near Vincennes	October 16, 2009	Historic Pioneer route through the lower Ohio River Valley	Historic	
AAR	International Selkirk Loop (Note: Distance and termini shown refer to the United States portion of the loop. Including the additional 125.5 miles (202.0 km) of the Canadian portion, the total length of the loop is 288.7 miles (464.6 km).)	144.1	231.9	Idaho, Washington	British Columbia–Washington border on SR 31	Idaho–British Columbia border on SH 1	September 22, 2005	Internationally designated scenic highway encircles the remote Selkirk Mountains spanning the Canadian border	Historic, Recreational, Scenic	
NSB	Jemez Mountain Trail	163.0	262.3	New Mexico	US 550 and NM 126 in Cuba; US 550 and NM 4 in San Ysidro	NM 4 and NM 501 near Los Alamos	June 9, 1998	Scenic drive past geological formations and Indian ruins	Recreational	
NSB	Journey Through Hallowed Ground Byway	180.0	289.7	Maryland, Pennsylvania, Virginia	A loop that begins and ends at the intersection of SR 20 and SR 231 near Somerset, Virginia	PA 394 near Gettysburg, Pennsylvania	October 16, 2009	Historic corridor featuring hundreds of sites significant to American history, most notably the densest collection of Civil War battlefields in the nation; "Where America Happened"	Recreational, Historic	
NSB	Kaibab Plateau–North Rim Parkway	42.0	67.6	Arizona	Bright Angel Point in Grand Canyon National Park	US 89A in Jacob Lake	June 9, 1998	Scenic drive through ponderosa pine forests to the North Rim of the Grand Canyon	Scenic	
NSB	Kancamagus Scenic Byway	26.5	42.6	New Hampshire	US 3 in North Woodstock	NH 113 in Conway	September 19, 1996	Scenic drive through the heart of the White Mountains	Scenic	
NSB	Katahdin Woods and Waters Scenic Byway	89.0	143.2	Maine	South entrance of Baxter State Park	Grand Lake Road near Grand Lake Matagamon	February 16, 2021	Scenic route around the forested waterways of inland Maine near Mt. Katahdin and the neighboring national monument	Recreational	
NSB	Lake Erie Coastal Ohio Trail	293.0	471.5	Ohio	Waterville, Ohio	US 20 at the Pennsylvania state line	September 22, 2005	Follows the south shore of Lake Erie	Historic	
NSB	Lake Tahoe - Eastshore Drive	28.0	45.1	Nevada	US 50 in Stateline	SR 28 in Crystal Bay	September 19, 1996	Follows the east shore of Lake Tahoe	Scenic	
AAR	Lakes to Locks Passage	234.0	376.6	New York	US 4 and NY 32 in Waterford	US 11 and NY 9B in Rouses Point	June 13, 2002 (AAR)	Parallels the interconnected waterways of the Hudson River, Champlain Canal, Lake George, and Lake Champlain between Upstate New York and Quebec	Historic, Recreational	
NSB	Lariat Loop Scenic and Historic Byway	40	64	Colorado	Evergreen, Colorado	Begins and ends at the intersection of 6th Avenue and 19th Street in Golden	October 16, 2009	Loops through the historic towns of Morrison, Evergreen and Golden in the foothills west of Denver	Historic	
AAR	Las Vegas Strip	4.5	7.2	Nevada	Las Vegas Boulevard and Russell Road	Las Vegas Boulevard and Sahara Avenue	June 15, 2000	Urban boulevard lined with the glitz and glamour of Las Vegas's world-famous casinos	Cultural, Scenic	
NSB	Lincoln Heritage Scenic Highway	71.2	114.6	Kentucky	Abraham Lincoln Birthplace National Historical Park	US 150 in Danville	October 16, 2009	Explores aspects of Kentucky history including Abraham Lincoln, the Civil War, and bourbon heritage	Historic	
NSB	Lincoln Highway	178.8	287.8	Illinois	IL 136 at the Mississippi River in Fulton	US 30 at the Indiana state line	June 15, 2000	A portion of America's first transcontinental highway, the Lincoln Highway	Historic	
NSB	Lincoln Highway Heritage Byway	460.0	740.3	Iowa	US 30 at the Missouri River near Missouri Valley; I-480/US 6 at the Missouri River in Council Bluffs	Iowa 136 and US 30 in Clinton	February 16, 2021	Portion of the first transcontinental highway, visiting historical communities across the entirety of Iowa	Historic	
NSB	Lincoln Highway Scenic and Historic Byway	450.0	724.2	Nebraska	US 30 at the Wyoming state line near Bushnell	US 30 at the Missouri River in Blair	February 16, 2021	Portion of the Main Street of America, following the Platte River across Nebraska	Historic	
NSB	Loess Hills Scenic Byway	220.0	354.1	Iowa	US 275 at the Missouri border	Iowa 12 and Iowa 48 near Akron	June 15, 2000	Unique and expansive silt deposits in the Missouri River Valley	Natural	
NSB	Logan Canyon Scenic Byway	41.0	66.0	Utah	Main Street and US 89 in downtown Logan	US 89 and SR 30 in Garden City at Bear Lake	June 13, 2002	Follows the Logan River through the forests, meadows, and rock formations of scenic Logan Canyon	Natural	
NSB	McKenzie Pass-Santiam Pass Scenic Byway	82.0	132.0	Oregon	Junction of OR 126 and OR 242 at the McKenzie River ranger station	Begins and ends at the intersection of OR 242 and US 20 in Sisters	June 9, 1998	Loop around Mount Washington crossing two Cascade passes	Scenic	
NSB	Meeting of the Great Rivers Scenic Route	33.0	53.1	Illinois	IL 108 at the Illinois River near Kampsville	IL 3 near Alton	June 9, 1998; June 15, 2000 (extended)	Floodplain where the Illinois, Mississippi, and Missouri rivers meet	Historic	
NSB	Merritt Parkway	37.0	59.5	Connecticut	New York–Connecticut state line on Route 15	Sikorsky Bridge on the Housatonic River near Milford	September 19, 1996	Historic parkway through Connecticut's Gold Coast known for its elaborate Art Deco bridges	Historic	
NSB	Midland Trail	116.8	188.0	West Virginia	US 60 in Charleston	US 60 in White Sulphur Springs	June 15, 2000	Scenic drive through the New River Gorge	Recreational	
NSB	Millstone Valley Scenic Byway	27.5	44.3	New Jersey	Kingston, New Jersey	East Millstone, New Jersey	October 16, 2009	Scenic and historic drive along the Millstone River in central New Jersey	Historic	
NSB	Minnesota River Valley Scenic Byway	287	462	Minnesota	MN 7 in Browns Valley	MN 93 near Belle Plaine	June 13, 2002	Historic drive through the Minnesota River Valley	Historic	
NSB	Mohawk Towpath Byway	26.2	42.2	New York	Aqueduct Road in Schenectady	Fonda Road and NY 32 in Waterford	September 22, 2005	Follows the historic Erie Canal	Historic	
NSB	Mohawk Trail Scenic Byway	69.0	111.0	Massachusetts	Route 2 in Williamstown	Routee 2A near Athol	February 16, 2021	Culturally significant route connecting the Connecticut River Valley and the Hudson River Valley through the Berkshires	Historic	
NSB	Mountains to Sound Greenway - I-90	100.0	160.9	Washington	I-90 in Seattle	I-90 near Thorp	June 9, 1998	Scenic drive across Snoqualmie Pass in the Cascades	Scenic	
NSB	Mt. Hood Scenic Byway	105.0	169.0	Oregon	Troutdale Bridge crossing the Sandy River near Troutdale	OR 35 near Hood River	September 22, 2005	Provides scenic views of Mount Hood	Historic	
AAR	Natchez Trace Parkway	444.0	714.5	Alabama, Mississippi, Tennessee	Liberty Road in Natchez	SR 100 in Pasquo	September 19, 1996	Two-lane limited-access parkway through rural countryside commemorating the historic route of the Natchez Trace	Historic, Scenic	
NSB	Native American Scenic Byway	350	560	North Dakota, South Dakota	SD 50 and I-90 in Chamberlain	ND 24 at Lake Oahe near Cannon Ball	June 9, 1998 (South Dakota); September 22, 2005 (extended)	Traverses four Lakota Sioux reservations	Cultural, Historic	
NSB	Nebo Loop Scenic Byway	37.0	59.5	Utah	SR 132 near Nephi	I-15 and SR 115 in Payson	June 9, 1998	Alpine backroad through the Mount Nebo Wilderness in the southern Wasatch Range	Scenic	
AAR	Newfound Gap Road Byway	31.0	49.9	Tennessee, North Carolina	US 441 at park boundary near Cherokee	US 441 at park boundary near Gatlinburg	February 16, 2021	One of the primary routes, passing through Newfound Gap, through Great Smoky Mountains National Park	Historic, Scenic	
NSB	Norris Freeway	21.0	33.8	Tennessee	US 441 and SR 33 in Halls Crossroads	US 441 and US 25W in Rocky Top	February 16, 2021	Route through rural eastern Tennessee, crossing Norris Dam, the first large-scale project of the TVA	Recreational	
AAR	North Shore Scenic Drive	154.0	247.8	Minnesota	Canal Park in Duluth	Canadian border on MN 61 near Grand Portage	June 15, 2000 (AAR); June 13, 2002 (extended)	Follows the scenic North Shore of Lake Superior	Recreational, Scenic	
AAR	Northwest Passage Scenic Byway	202.0	325.1	Idaho	Washington–Idaho state line on US 12 near Lewiston	Idaho–Montana state line on US 12 at Lolo Pass	June 13, 2002 (NSB); September 22, 2005 (extended, AAR)	Follows the route of Lewis and Clark's historic search for the Northwest Passage through scenic mountains and river valleys	Historic, Cultural	
NSB	Ohio & Erie Canalway	110.0	177.0	Ohio	New Philadelphia	Public Square, Cleveland	June 15, 2000	Historic drive along the Ohio and Erie Canal through Cuyahoga Valley National Park and Cleveland Metroparks	Historic	
NSB	Ohio River Scenic Byway	943.0	1,517.6	Illinois, Indiana, Ohio	US 60/US 62 at the Cairo Mississippi River Bridge in Cairo	SR 39 at the Pennsylvania border near East Liverpool	September 19, 1996 (Indiana); June 9, 1998 (Illinois, Ohio)	Follows the north bank of the Ohio River	Historic	
NSB	Old Canada Road Scenic Byway	78.2	125.9	Maine	US 201 and SR 43 near Madison	US 201 at the Canadian border	June 15, 2000	Historic route between Maine and Quebec along the Kennebec River	Scenic	
NSB	Old Frankfort Pike Historic and Scenic Byway	15.5	24.9	Kentucky	KY 1681 and US 60 near Frankfort	KY 1681 and KY 4 in Lexington	February 16, 2021	Rural route through the historic inner Bluegrass Region	Historic	
NSB	Old Kings Highway (Route 6A)	34.0	54.7	Massachusetts	Sandwich Road and US 6 in Bourne	Route 6A and US 6 in Orleans	February 16, 2021	Route through Cape Cod traversing numerous National Historic Districts	Historic	
NSB	Ormond Scenic Loop & Trail	36.0	57.9	Florida	SR 40 in Ormond Beach	Bulow Creek State Park	February 16, 2021	Loop route connecting numerous state and local parks along Florida's Surf Coast	Scenic	
NSB	Outback Scenic Byway	170.0	273.6	Oregon	California–Oregon state line on US 395	OR 31 and US 97 near La Pine	June 9, 1998	Scenic drive through rugged backcountry of south-central Oregon	Natural	
NSB	Outer Banks Scenic Byway	137.8	221.8	North Carolina	US 70 near Beaufort	NC 12 and US 64 in Nags Head	October 16, 2009	Connects the barrier islands, beaches, and lighthouses of the Outer Banks	Cultural	
AAR	Pacific Coast Scenic Byway-Oregon	363.0	584.2	Oregon	California–Oregon state line on US 101	Oregon–Washington state line on US 101	June 9, 1998 (NSB); June 13, 2002 (AAR)	Scenic drive along the entire length of Oregon's Pacific coast	Natural, Scenic	
NSB	Palisades Scenic Byway	57.5	92.5	New Jersey, New York	Palisades Parkway at US 9 / George Washington Bridge in Fort Lee	US 6 and US 202 at the Highland Falls, New York in Highland Falls	February 16, 2021	Route along the Hudson River and the Palisades cliffs	Scenic	
NSB	Paul Bunyan Scenic Byway	54.0	86.9	Minnesota	Loop route connecting: Pequot Lakes, Pine River	Loop route connecting: Manhattan Beach, Crosslake	September 22, 2005	Passes through the North Woods of central Minnesota	Recreational	
NSB	Payette River Scenic Byway	112.0	180.2	Idaho	SH 55 at SH 44 in Eagle	ID 55 at US 95 in New Meadows	June 13, 2002	Traverses foothills and the Long Valley along the Payette River in Idaho	Recreational	
NSB	Pend Oreille Scenic Byway	33.0	53.1	Idaho	SH 200 at US 2/US 95 in Ponderay	SH 200 and MT 200 at the Montana state line near Clark Fork	June 13, 2002	Scenic drive along Lake Pend Oreille	Recreational	
NSB	Peter Norbeck Scenic Byway	68.0	109.4	South Dakota	Loop connecting: Custer via SD 87 and SD 89	Loop connecting: Keyston via US 16A and SD 244	September 19, 1996	Scenic drive through the Black Hills National Forest, Custer State Park, and the Mount Rushmore environs of southwestern South Dakota	Scenic	
NSB	Pine Barrens Byway	130.0	209.2	New Jersey	Route 47 in Maurice River Township	US 9 in Tuckerton	February 16, 2012	Rural route through the largest remaining coastal pine barren ecosystem	Natural	
NSB	Pioneer Historic Byway	127.0	204.4	Idaho	US 91 at the Utah state line near Franklin	SH 34 at the Wyoming state line near Freedom	September 22, 2005	Scenic route exploring the rich pioneer history of southeastern Idaho, including Mormon settlements and Oregon Trail ruts	Historic	
NSB	Pyramid Lake Scenic Byway	30.2	48.6	Nevada	Washeim and Main streets in Wadsworth	NV 447 near Nixon; NV 446 and Hardscrabble Canyon Road in Sutcliffe	September 19, 1996	One of the largest desert lakes in the world	Natural	
NSB	Rangeley Lakes Scenic Byway	35.6	57.3	Maine	SR 17 near Houghton	SR 4 near Madrid	June 15, 2000	Scenic drive along the northern Appalachian ridgeline and the forests and lakes of the Western Maine Mountains	Recreational	
NSB	Red River Gorge Scenic Byway	46.0	74.0	Kentucky	KY 11 at KY 715 in Zachariah	KY 11 at KY 213 in Stanton	June 13, 2002	Scenic drive through the Red River Gorge	Natural	
AAR	Red Rock Scenic Byway	7.5	12.1	Arizona	I-17 north of Rimrock	SR 89A in Sedona	September 22, 2005	Scenic drive through the red sandstone canyons of the Coconino National Forest	Scenic, Recreational	
NSB	Religious Freedom Byway	195	314	Maryland	MD 234 near Port Tobacco	MD 5 at Point Lookout State Park	October 16, 2009	Provides access to historic churches and the first capital of Maryland, St. Mary's City	Historic	
NSB	Revolutionary Heritage Byway	6.0	9.7	Rhode Island	Route 114 at the Mount Hope Bridge	Route 114 at Bristol-Warren town line	February 16, 2021	Exemplifies the culture of colonial New England and the site of the oldest continuous Independence Day celebration	Historic	
NSB	River of Lakes Heritage Corridor	156.0	251.1	Florida	SR 415 in Sanford	River Drive in Oak Hill; US 17 near Seville	February 16, 2021	Tours through the lakelands of the Halifax Area, site of some of the earliest settlements in Florida	Historic	
NSB	River Road Scenic Byway	23.5	37.8	Michigan	M-65 and Rollways Road near Hale	US 23 in Oscoda	September 22, 2005	Scenic drive through the Au Sable River Valley	Recreational	
NSB	Rogue-Umpqua Scenic Byway	172.0	276.8	Oregon	OR 234 at I-5 in Gold Hill	OR 138 at I-5 in Roseburg	June 13, 2002	Follows two scenic rivers through southwestern Oregon	Recreational	
AAR	Route One, Big Sur Coast Highway	72.0	115.9	California	San Luis Obispo–Monterey county line	Ocean Avenue in Carmel	September 19, 1996	Scenic drive along the Pacific coast	Historic, Scenic	
AAR	Route One, San Luis Obispo North Coast Byway	57.0	91.7	California	US 101 in San Luis Obispo	San Luis Obispo–Monterey county line	June 13, 2002	Scenic drive along the Pacific coast	Historic, Scenic	
NSB	Russell-Brasstown Scenic Byway	40.6	65.3	Georgia	SR 348, SR 17, SR 75 near Robertstown	SR 180 at Brasstown Bald	June 15, 2000	Winds through the southern Appalachians and the highest point in Georgia	Scenic	
AAR	San Juan Skyway	233.0	375.0	Colorado	US 160 in Durango; SSR 145 in Cortez	SR 62 in Ridgway; US 550 in Ouray	September 19, 1996	Loop through the San Juan Mountains, Colorado's most rugged and isolated mountain range	Historic, Scenic	
NSB	Sandhills Journey Scenic Byway	272.0	437.7	Nebraska	N-2 in Alliance	NE 2 in Grand Island	February 16, 2021	Route through the ecologically unique Sand Hills, the largest dunefield in the western hemisphere	Natural	
NSB	Santa Fe Trail Scenic and Historic Byway	565.0	909.3	Colorado, New Mexico	Santa Fe Plaza in Santa Fe	US 50/US 400 at the Kansas state line near Holly; NM 410 at the Oklahoma state line near Clayton	June 9, 1998	Follows part of the route of the historic Santa Fe Trail through scenic mountains and high plains	Historic	
NSB	Savannah River Scenic Byway	110.0	177.0	South Carolina	SC 28 at the Georgia border near Clarks Hill	SC 24 in Oakway	June 9, 1998	Scenic drive along the Savannah River in rural South Carolina	Historic	
AAR	Scenic Byway 12 (Journey Through Time)	124.0	199.6	Utah	US 89 near Panguitch	SR 24 near Torrey	June 13, 2002 (AAR)	Scenic drive through canyons, plateaus, and valleys	Historic, Scenic	
NSB	Scenic Byway 143 - Utah's Patchwork Parkway	51.0	82.1	Utah	SR 143 at I-15 in Parowan	UT 143 at US 89 in Panguitch	October 16, 2009	Scenic drive through Dixie National Forest and Cedar Breaks National Monument	Historic	
NSB	Scenic Highway 30A	32.0	51.5	Florida	CR 30A at US 98 near Santa Rosa Beach	CR 30A at US 98 near Rosemary Beach	February 16, 2021	Local route through historic beach communities on Florida's Emerald Coast	Natural	
NSB	Scenic Highway of Legends	82.0	132.0	Colorado	SH 12 near Stonewall	US 160 in Walsenburg; SH 12 in Trinidad	February 16, 2021	Route through undisturbed cultural crossroads in the Spanish Peaks	Natural	
NSB	Schoodic Scenic Byway	29.0	46.7	Maine	US 1 in Hancock	SSR 186 at SR 195 in Prospect Harbor	June 15, 2000	Unspoiled coastline through the Schoodic Peninsula and the "quiet side" of Acadia National Park	Scenic	
AAR	Selma to Montgomery March Byway	54.0	86.9	Alabama	J.L. Chestnut Jr. Boulevard and Martin Luther King Street in Selma	Alabama State Capitol in Montgomery	September 19, 1996	Historic route of the 1965 Selma to Montgomery marches led by Martin Luther King Jr.	Historic, Natural	
NSB	Sequatchie Valley Scenic Byway	65.0	104.6	Tennessee	SR 28 at I-24 in Jasper	SR 28 / US 127 at I-40 in Crossville	February 16, 2021	Route through one of the most undisturbed valleys in the Appalachians	Scenic	
AAR	Seward Highway	125.3	201.7	Alaska	Railway Avenue in Seward	East 5th Avenue in Anchorage	June 9, 1998 (NSB); June 15, 2000 (AAR)	Showcases the peaks and fjords of south-central Alaska	Recreational, Scenic	
NSB	Sheyenne River Valley Scenic Byway	63.0	101.4	North Dakota	ND 32 in Lisbon	CR 21 north of Valley City	June 13, 2002	Historic drive through quaint farmland along the Sheyenne River	Historic	
NSB	Silver Thread Colorado Scenic & Historic Byway	117.0	188.3	Colorado	SH 149 and US 160 in South Fork	SH 149 and US 50 in Curecanti National Recreation Area	February 16, 2021	Route tracing the geological and mining history in the San Juan Mountains	Historic	
NSB	Sky Island Scenic Byway	27.2	43.8	Arizona	Catalina Highway north of Tucson	Catalina Highway in Summerhaven	September 22, 2005	Climb from the Sonoran Desert through Coronado National Forest to the peak of Mount Lemmon in the Catalina Mountains	Natural	
NSB	Skyline Drive	105.0	169.0	Virginia	US 250 near I-64 in Rockfish Gap	US 340 near Front Royal	September 22, 2005	Scenic drive through Shenandoah National Park	Scenic	
NSB	St. John Valley Cultural Byway/Fish River Scenic Byway	134.0	215.7	Maine	SR 161 in Allagash; SR 11 at Portage Lake	US 1 in Hamlin	February 16, 2021	Route through the Saint John and Fish river valleys in the rural "County" of northern Maine	Cultural	
NSB	Staunton-Parkersburg Turnpike	180.0	289.7	West Virginia	WV 47 and WV 618 in Parkersburg	West Virginia–Virginia state line on US 250	September 22, 2005	Historic drive through West Virginia forests and backcountry	Historic	
NSB	Stevens Pass Greenway	89.2	143.6	Washington	US 2 near Monroe	US 2 in Cashmere	September 22, 2005	Scenic drive across the Cascades	Recreational	
NSB	Strait of Juan de Fuca Highway - SR 112	61.1	98.3	Washington	Makah Indian Reservation boundary near Neah Bay	US 101 near Port Angeles	June 15, 2000	Follows the shoreline of the Olympic Peninsula where it meets the Strait of Juan de Fuca	Natural	
NSB	Talimena Scenic Drive	54.0	86.9	Arkansas, Oklahoma	SH 1 and US 271 near Talihina	AR 88 and US 71 in Mena	September 22, 2005	Crest drive through the Ouachita Mountains, some of the highest ridges between the Appalachians and Rockies	Scenic	
NSB	Talladega Scenic Drive	26.4	42.5	Alabama	Adams Gap Road southwest of Cheaha State Park	US 78 west of Heflin	June 9, 1998	Scenic drive through the southernmost extension of the Appalachian Mountains	Scenic	
AAR	The Battle Road Scenic Byway	16.0	25.7	Massachusetts	Barrett's Mill Road near Minuteman National Historical Park in Concord	Massachusetts Avenue at Alewife Brook in Arlington	February 16, 2021	Connects sites of literary, technological, and environmental importance to the American Revolution	Historic, Cultural	
NSB	Tioga Road/Big Oak Flat Road	64.0	103.0	California	Big Oak Flat entrance gate to Yosemite	Tioga Pass entrance gate to Yosemite	September 19, 1996	High mountain pass through Yosemite National Park	Natural	
NSB	Top of the Rockies	75.0	120.7	Colorado	SH 82 in Aspen	I-70 west of Vail; I-70 near Copper Mountain	June 9, 1998; October 16, 2009 (extended)	Scenic high-altitude drive through the Rocky Mountains and historic Leadville	Scenic	
NSB	Trail of the Ancients	1,271.0	2,045.5	Colorado, Utah, New Mexico	Loop connecting: Monument Valley, Zuni Pueblo, El Malpais National Monument	Loop connecting: Natural Bridges National Monument, Monticello, Mesa Verde National Park	September 22, 2005; February 16, 2021 (NM)	Scenic drive through the Native American history of the Four Corners region	Archeological	
NSB	Trail of the Mountain Spirits Scenic Byway	95.0	152.9	New Mexico	US 180 in Silver City; NM 35 and NM 152 in San Lorenzo	NM 15 at Gila Cliff Dwellings National Monument	September 22, 2005	Scenic drive through the mountains of southwestern New Mexico	Natural	
AAR	Trail Ridge Road/Beaver Meadow Road	48.0	77.2	Colorado	US 34 near Grand Lake	Loop connecting: Moraine Avenue and West Elkhorn Avenue in Estes Park	September 19, 1996 (AAR)	America's highest continuously paved road crosses the alpine tundra of Rocky Mountain National Park	Natural, Scenic	
NSB	Turquoise Trail	62.0	99.8	New Mexico	NM 14 at NM 333 in Tijeras	NM 14 at I-25 in Santa Fe	June 15, 2000	High route between Albuquerque and Santa Fe	Scenic	
AAR	Volcanic Legacy Scenic Byway	500.0	804.7	California, Oregon	A bypass around Lake Almanor	US 97 and OR 138 at Diamond Lake Junction	June 9, 1998 (AAR, Oregon); June 13, 2002 (AAR, California)	Scenic drive through the Cascade Volcanic Arc	Natural, Recreational	
NSB	Washington Heritage Trail	136.0	218.9	West Virginia	WV 9 in Paw Paw	WV 51 in Harpers Ferry	June 15, 2000	Scenic drive tracing the footsteps of George Washington through West Virginia's Eastern Panhandle	Historic	
NSB	West Cascades Scenic Byway	220.0	354.1	Oregon	OR 58 in Oakridge	OR 224 in Estacada	June 15, 2000	Intimate backcountry tour of old-growth forests, rivers, and lakes along the west side of the Cascades	Scenic	
NSB	Western Heritage Historic Byway	40.0	64.4	Idaho	Swan Falls Road at the Swan Falls Dam	SH 69 at I-84 in Meridian	September 22, 2005	Scenic drive to the Snake River Canyon	Scenic	
NSB	Western Highlands Scenic Byway	21.4	34.4	New Jersey	CR 515 at Route 23 in Hardyston Township	Route 94 at the New York state line in Vernon Township	February 16, 2021	Route through the central Appalachian Highlands in the Skylands Region of New Jersey	Recreational	
NSB	Wetlands and Wildlife Scenic Byway	76.7	123.4	Kansas	NE 70th Street and US 281 near St. John	US 281 and K-4 near Hoisington	September 22, 2005	Scenic drive through wetlands of central Kansas	Natural	
NSB	White Mountain Trail	100.0	160.9	New Hampshire	US 3 near Lincoln	US 302 in Conway	June 9, 1998	Passes through the White Mountains and past Mount Washington	Scenic	
NSB	White Pass Scenic Byway	120.0	193.1	Washington	US 12 at I-5 near Chehalis	US 12 at SR 410 near Naches	October 16, 2009	Scenic route through Wenatchee and Gifford Pinchot National Forests, across the Cascades through White Pass	Recreational	
NSB	Whitewater Canal Scenic Byway	430.0	692.0	Indiana	Loop connecting: Lawrenceburg, Batesville on SR 101, SR 46, SR 350	Loop connecting: Hagestown, West Harrison on SR 1, SR 121, US 52, US 27, US 40	February 16, 2021	Follows a canalway connecting the National Road to the Ohio River Valley	Recreational	
NSB	Wichita Mountains Byway	93.0	149.7	Oklahoma	Loop connecting: Wichita Mountains Wildlife Refuge, Medicine Park on SH 49	Loop connecting: Carnegie, Apache on SH 115, SH 58, SH 19	October 16, 2009	Guides drivers through the protected valleys of the 550 million-year-old Wichita Mountains	Natural	
NSB	Wilderness Road Heritage Highway	93.8	151.0	Kentucky	US 25E at the Cumberland Gap near Middlesboro	US 25 in Berea	June 13, 2002	Follows Daniel Boone's historic entrance to the valleys of Kentucky	Historic	
NSB	Wisconsin Lake Superior Scenic Byway	70.4	113.3	Wisconsin	WIS 13 near Brule	WIS 13 and US 2 near Ashland	February 16, 2021	Follows the Lake Superior coastline through the Bayfield Peninsula near Apostle Islands National Lakeshore	Natural	
NSB	Woodlands Trace	43.0	69.2	Kentucky, Tennessee	SR 49 near Dover	KY 453 near Grand Rivers	February 16, 2021	Ridge-top route through Land Between the Lakes National Recreation Area	Recreational	
AAR	Woodward Avenue (M-1) – Automotive Heritage Trail	25.5	41.0	Michigan	Jefferson Avenue in Detroit	Cesar E. Chavez Boulevard in Pontiac	June 13, 2002 (NSB); February 16. 2021 (AAR)	Connects automobile-related historic sites of the "Motor City"	Cultural, Historic	
NSB	Zion Scenic Byway	28.0	45.1	Utah	SR 9 at SR 17 in La Verkin	SR 9 at Zion National Park boundary near Mt. Carmel Junction	February 16, 2021	Scenic route through Zion Canyon, the Mt. Carmel Tunnel, and the red rock country of southern Utah	Scenic	

== Former byways ==
Name	State(s)	Description
Catoctin Mountain Scenic Byway	Maryland, Virginia	Incorporated into part of the Journey Through Hallowed Ground National Scenic Byway
Dry Cimarron Scenic Byway	New Mexico, Oklahoma	De-designated in 2010
Tamiami Trail Scenic Highway	Florida	De-designated in 2008

== See also ==
- Scenic byways in the United States
- State wildlife trails
