= 2025 New Mexico wildfires =

Natural disasters in the USA

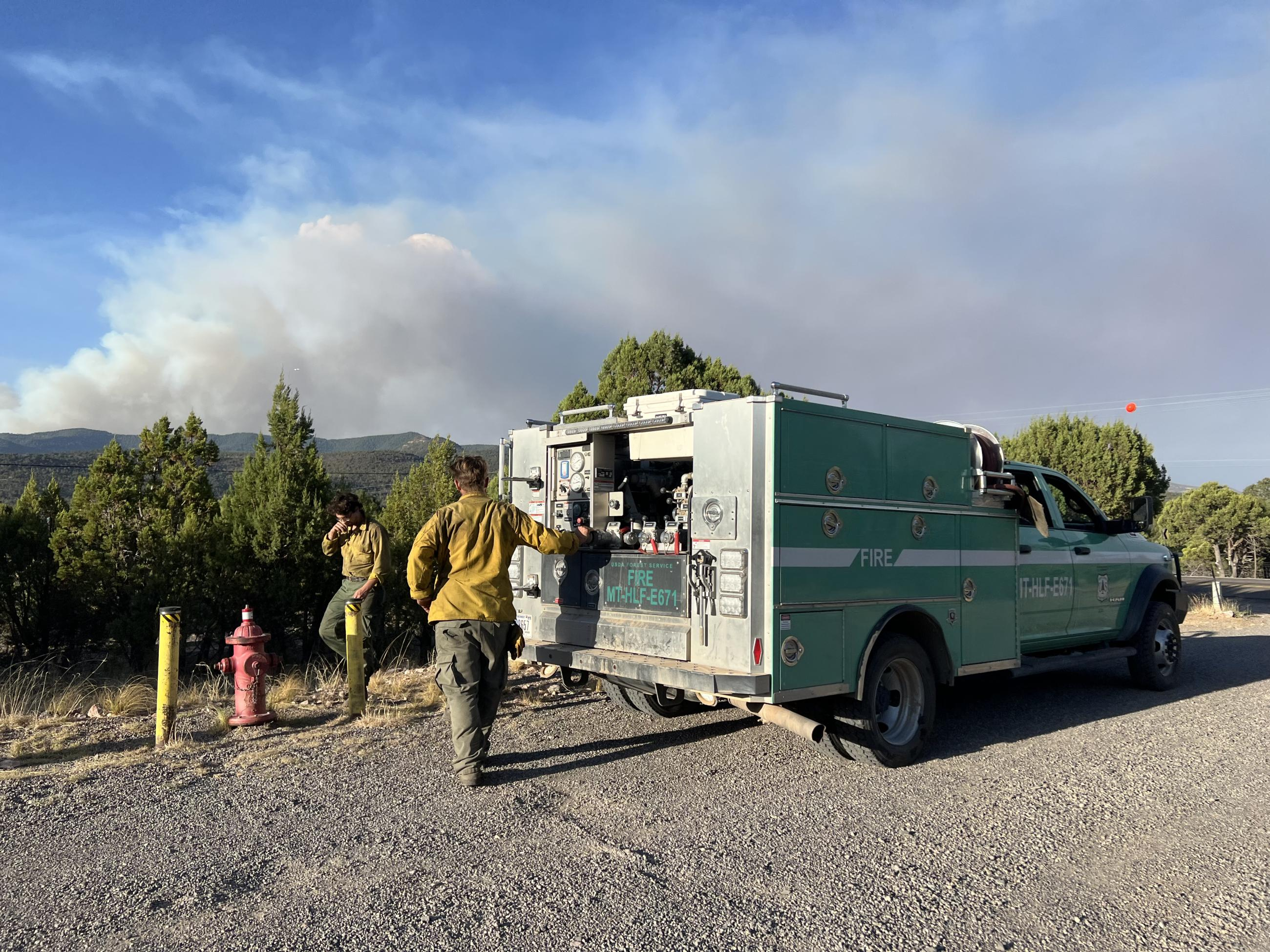
- Crews refilling water tanks fighting the Trout Fire on June 13

The 2025 New Mexico wildfires were a series of wildfires that burned in the U.S. state of New Mexico.

== Background ==
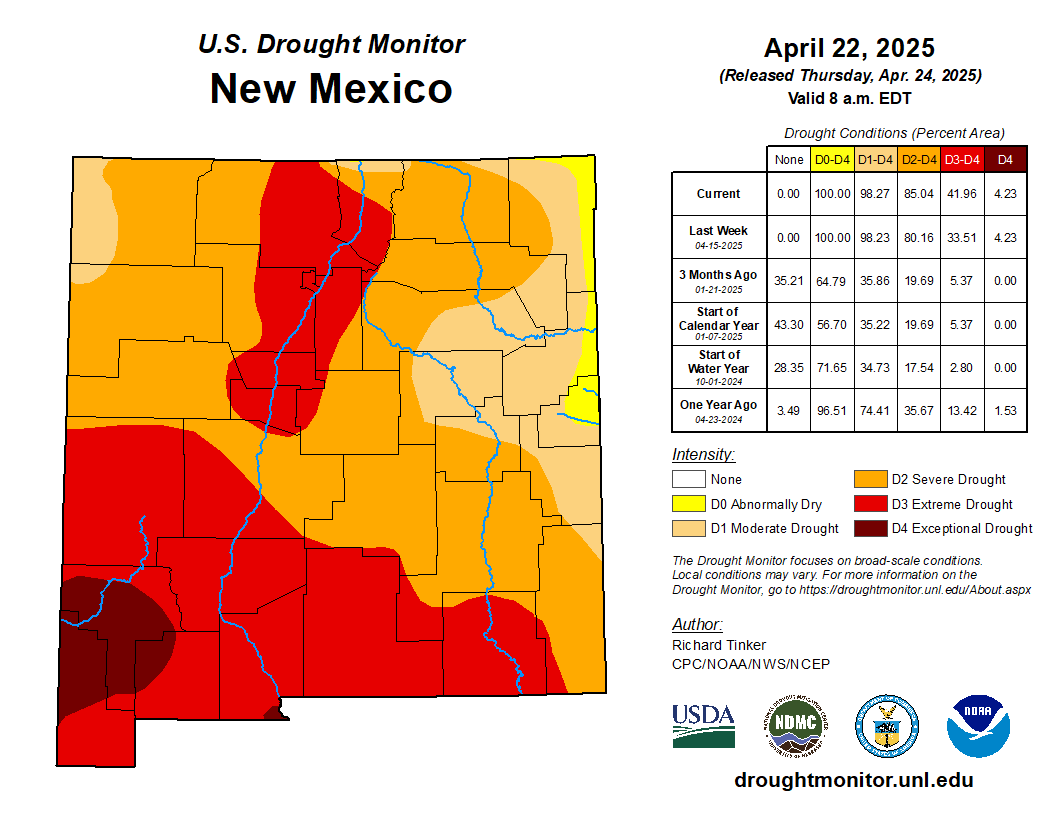
New Mexico Drought Monitor on April 22, 2025

While "fire season" can vary every year in New Mexico based on weather conditions, most wildfires occur in from early May through June, before the monsoon season. However, there is an increasing fire risk year-round from climate change. Droughts are becoming more common partly from rising temperatures in the state that evaporate water from streams. Unpredictable monsoon levels can increase fire risks. New Mexico is prone to strong winds, and jet stream disruption from climate change can make them stronger. Intense winds contribute to drought, allow wildfires to spread, and dry out vegetation. Unique plant life and fine fuels in the state fuel wildfires, especially in the Eastern New Mexico grasslands. Rising temperatures will reduce snowpack and shorten the snowmelt season which can increase drought and wildfire severity.

Overgrazing and logging in the late 1800s and over 100 years of strict fire suppression affected natural systems of New Mexico led to a growing wildfire risk and intensity. Scientists predict New Mexico's forests will gradually deteriorate, turning into shrublands as wildfires burn the forests.

== Summary ==
The 2025 New Mexico wildfire season has been more active than in some recent years, fueled by worsening drought, low humidity, and strong winds.

By early June, large fires had already erupted in southwestern New Mexico. The Buck and Trout fires—both ignited by lightning—together burned over 80,000 acres by mid-June, rapidly spreading under dry, windy conditions.

The Trout Fire, located in Grant County near the Gila National Forest, has consumed more than 47,000 acres as of July 9 and remains mostly contained.

Prescribed fire operations have also been scheduled in many areas, particularly in the Carson and Cibola National Forests, as part of hazardous fuels reduction efforts.

Smoke from large fires, particularly in the southwest, has affected air quality in adjacent counties and reduced visibility on impacted days.

== List of wildfires ==
The following is a list of fires that burned more than 1,000 acres (400 ha), produced significant structural damage, or resulted in casualties.

Name	County	Acres	Start date	Containment date (Note: Containment means that fire crews have established and secured control lines around the fire's perimeter. These lines are artificial barriers, like trenches or cleared vegetation, designed to stop the fire's spread, or natural barriers like rivers. Containment reflects progress in managing the fire but does not necessarily mean the fire is starved of fuel, under control, or put out.)	Notes	Ref.
Cottonwood Canyon	Lincoln	2,011	February 8	February 14	Caused by human activity. The fire resulted in approximately $450,000 in damage.	
Mogote Hill	Mora, San Miguel	21,433	March 14	April 7		
Trout	Grant	47,294	June 12	July 25	Lightning-caused. Burned about 12 miles (19 km) north of Silver City and prompted evacuations for the Lake Roberts area and destroyed two houses.	
Buck	Catron	57,753	June 11	July 21	Started from a lightning strike on BLM lands. Threatened structures on private ranches.	
Laguna	Rio Arriba	17,415	June 25	September 19	Lightning-caused. Burned about 8 miles (13 km) north of Gallina.	
Turkeyfeather	Catron	24,178	June 30	September 10	Lightning-caused. Burned 22 miles (35 km) southeast of Reserve.	
Goose	Grant	3,690	July 9	August 4	Lightning-caused. Burned 18 miles (29 km) northwest of Silver City.	
Middle Mesa	Rio Arriba	5,031	August 1		Lightning-caused. Burned 5 miles east of Navajo Lake.	
Vereda Blanca	Sandoval	1,307	August 8		Lightning-caused. Burned 43 miles (69 km) northwest of Albuquerque.	

Perimeters of 2025 New Mexico wildfires (map data)

== See also ==
- 2025 United States wildfires
