= National Forest Scenic Byway =

US Forest Service official scenic route

National Forest Scenic Byways
- Highway marker

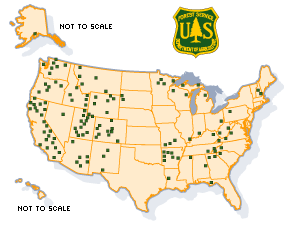
- National Forest Scenic Byways highlighted with green dots

System information
- Formed: 1987

Highway names
- Interstates: Interstate nn (I-nn)
- US Highways: US Highway nn, US Route nn (US nn)
- State: Varies by state

System links
- Scenic Byways; National; National Forest; BLM; NPS

The National Forest Scenic Byways are roads that have been designated by the U.S. Forest Service as scenic byways. Many are also National Scenic Byways (NSB). The program was initiated in 1987.

== List ==
The following roadways were listed by the Federal Highway Administration as National Forest Scenic Byways as of August 2013:

Name	Length (mi)	Length (km)	State(s)	National Forest	Southern or western terminus	Northern or eastern terminus	Date	Description	Ref(s).
Alaska's Marine Highway	3,500.00	5,632.70	Alaska	Tongass National Forest	Bellingham Cruise Terminal	Dutch Harbor			
Ancient Bristlecone Scenic Byway	34	55	California	Inyo National Forest	Section 1 SR 41 or SR 180 Section 2 Lake Sabrina	Section 1 Huntington Lake Section 2 SR66 at Oasis	July 13, 1992		
Andrew Pickens Scenic Parkway	58.10	93.50	South Carolina	Sumter National Forest	I-85 exit 1	I-85 exit 92			
Angeles Crest Scenic Byway	66	106	California	Angeles			October 5, 1990		
Apache Trail Historic Road	78	126	Arizona	Tonto					
Apalachee Savannahs Scenic Byway	31.5	50.7	Florida	Apalachicola				Follows SR 65, CR 379 and SR 12 through Apalachicola National Forest in the Florida Panhandle	
Arkansas Scenic 7 Byway	297.27	478.41	Arkansas	Ouachita and Ozark-St Francis					
Avenue of Pines	0.00	0							
Beartooth Highway	68.7	110.6						Also a NSB	
Beaver Canyon Scenic Byway	40.48	65.15							
Big Cottonwood Canyon Scenic Byway	19.93	32.07							
Big Walker Mountain Scenic Byway	0.00	0							
Bigfoot Scenic Byway	146.51	235.78							
Bighorn Scenic Byway	58	93	Wyoming	Bighorn	Shell	6.5 mi (10.5 km) west of Dayton		US 14 through Bighorn National Forest.	
Black River Scenic Byway	11.33	18.23	Michigan	Ottawa	CR 204 & CR 513 near Bessemer	Black River Harbor	June 20, 1992	Runs parallel to the Black River in the Ottawa National Forest in the Upper Peninsula of Michigan	
Blue Buck Knob Scenic Byway	0.00	0							
Blue Mountain Scenic Byway	0.00	0							
Buffalo Bill Cody Scenic Byway	27.5	44.3							
Cache La Poudre-North Park Scenic and Historic Byway	0.00	0							
Carson Pass Highway	122	196							
Cascade Lakes Scenic Byway	66	106						Also a NSB	
Cedar Breaks Scenic Byway	2.54	4.09							
Cherohala Skyway	43	69						Also a NSB	
Chinook Scenic Byway	107.44	172.91						Also a NSB	
Cloud Peak Skyway	0.00	0							
Coronado Trail Scenic Byway	0.00	0						Also a NSB	
Covered Bridge Scenic Byway	0.00	0							
Edge of the Wilderness	47	76						Also a NSB	
Elkhorn Scenic Byway	0.00	0							
Emigrant Trail	0.00	0							
Enchanted Circle Scenic Byway	84	135							
The Energy Loop: Huntington/Eccles Canyons Scenic Byway	82.88	133.38						Also a NSB	
Feather River Scenic Byway	0.00	0							
Fishlake Scenic Byway	0.00	0							
Flaming Gorge-Uintas Scenic Byway	79.55	128.02						Also a NSB	
Flat Tops Trail Scenic Byway	0.00	0							
Forest Heritage Scenic Byway	76.7	123.4						Consists of NC 215, US 276, and US 64 through Pisgah National Forest; also a NSB and NCSB	
From the Desert to Tall Pines Scenic Road	0.00	0							
Glade Top Trail	0.00	0							
Grand Mesa Scenic and Historic Byway	0.00	0						Also a NSB	
Great Divide Highway	27.2	43.8	Wisconsin	Chequamegon National Forest	WIS 77 toward Hayward	WIS 77 west of WIS 13		Follows WIS 77 throughout the forest	
Guanella Pass Road	0.00	0							
Hells Canyon Scenic Byway	0.00	0						Also a NSB	
Heritage Drive	0.00	0							
Highland Scenic Highway	0.00	0						Also a NSB	
Highlands Scenic Byway	0.00	0							
Highway of Legends	0.00	0							
Historic Columbia River Highway	0.00	0						Also a NSB	
Jacinto Reyes Scenic Byway	0.00	0							
Kaibab Plateau-North Rim Parkway	0.00	0						Also a NSB	
Kancamagus Scenic Byway	0.00	0						Also a NSB	
Kings Canyon Scenic Byway	0.00	0							
Kings Hill Scenic Byway	0.00	0							
Ladyslipper Scenic Byway	0.00	0							
Lake Koocanusa Scenic Byway	0.00	0							
Lamoille Canyon Road	12.1	19.5			Ruby Crest National Recreation Trail	SR 227 in Lamoille, Nevada		Traverses Lamoille Canyon in the Ruby Mountains	
Lassen Scenic Byway	0.00	0							
Lee Vining Canyon Scenic Byway	0.00	0							
Little Cottonwood Canyon Scenic Byway	0.00	0							
Logan Canyon Scenic Byway	0.00	0						Also a NSB	
Longhouse Scenic Byway	0.00	0							
Longleaf Trail Scenic Byway	0.00	0							
Markagunt High Plateau Scenic Byway	0.00	0							
McKenzie Pass-Santiam Pass Scenic Byway	0.00	0						Also a NSB	
Medicine Wheel Passage	51.89	83.51	Wyoming	Bighorn	US 14A / US 310 in Lovell	US 14 / US 14A at Burgess Junction		US 14A through Bighorn National Forest.	
Mesa Falls Scenic Byway	0.00	0							
Mirror Lake Scenic Byway - UT Section	0.00	0							
Modoc Volcanic Scenic Byway	0.00	0							
Mount Baker Highway	58	93			I-5 in Bellingham	Artist Point, Mt. Baker Ski Area	April 27, 1967	Follows SR 542 toward Mount Baker	
Mount Blue Sky Scenic Byway	28	45			Summit of Mount Blue Sky	I-70 in Idaho Springs, Colorado			
Mount Magazine Scenic Byway	0.00	0							
Mount Rogers Scenic Byway	0.00	0							
Mountain Loop Scenic Byway	0.00	0							
Mountain Waters Scenic Byway	0.00	0							
Nebo Loop Scenic Byway	0.00	0						Also a NSB	
North Cascades Scenic Highway	0.00	0							
North Shore Scenic Drive	0.00	0						Also a NSB	
Ocoee Scenic Byway	0.00	0						First Forest Service Byway	
Ogden River Scenic Byway	0.00	0							
Ohio River Scenic Byway	0.00	0							
Oscar Wigington Scenic Byway	0.00	0							
Ozark Highlands Scenic Byway	0.00	0							
Pacific Coast Scenic Byway - Oregon	0.00	0						Also a NSB	
Pacific Coast Scenic Byway - Washington	0.00	0							
Pines to Palms Scenic Byway	0.00	0						Sometimes incorrectly called the Palms to Pines Scenic Byway	
Peak to Peak Scenic Byway	0.00	0							
Peter Norbeck Scenic Byway	0.00	0						Also a NSB	
Pig Trail Scenic Byway	0.00	0							
Pioneer Mountains Scenic Byway	0.00	0							
Ridge and Valley Scenic Byway	0.00	0							
Rim of the World Scenic Byway	0.00	0							
River Road Scenic Byway	23.46	37.76	Michigan	Huron	M-65 and Rollways Road near Hale	US 23 in Oscoda	December 20, 1988	Scenic drive through the Au Sable River Valley in the Lower Peninsula of Michigan; also a NSB	
Rogue-Coquille Scenic Byway	0.00	0							
Rogue-Umpqua Scenic Byway	0.00	0						Also a NSB	
Russell-Brasstown National Scenic Byway	0.00	0						Also a NSB	
St. Francis Scenic Byway	0.00	0							
St. Regis-Paradise Scenic Byway	0.00	0							
San Juan Skyway	0.00	0						Also a NSB	
Sandia Crest Byway	0.00	0							
Santa Fe National Forest Scenic Byway	0.00	0							
Sawtooth Scenic Byway	0.00	0							
Scenic Byway 12	0.00	0						Also a NSB	
Seward Highway	0.00	0						Also a NSB	
Sherman Pass National Forest Scenic Byway	35	56			SR 21 in Republic	US 395 in Kettle Falls		Follows SR 20 through Sherman Pass	
Sierra Heritage Scenic Byway	0.00	0							
Sierra Vista Scenic Byway	0.00	0							
Silver Thread Scenic Byway	0.00	0							
Sky Island Scenic Byway	0.00	0						Also a NSB	
Smith River Scenic Byway	0.00	0							
Snowy Range Scenic Byway	0.00	0							
Spearfish Canyon Scenic Byway	0.00	0							
Spirit Lake Memorial Highway	0.00	0							
State of Jefferson Scenic Byway	0.00	0							
Stevens Pass Greenway	0.00	0						Also a NSB	
Sugar Camp Scenic Byway	0.00	0							
Sunrise Scenic Byway	0.00	0							
Sunspot Scenic Byway	0.00	0							
Sylamore Scenic Byway	26.5	42.6	Arkansas	Ozark	FSR 1110 at Blanchard Springs Caverns	AR 5 / AR 9 in Calico Rock	February 8, 1989	Byway in the Ozark National Forest to Blanchard Springs Caverns	
Talimena Scenic Drive	0.00	0						Also a NSB	
Talladega Scenic Drive	0.00	0						Also a NSB	
Teton Scenic Byway	0.00	0							
Tioga Road/Big Oak Flat Road	0.00	0						Also a NSB	
Trail of the Mountain Spirits Scenic Byway	0.00	0						Also a NSB	
Trinity Scenic Byway	0.00	0							
Trinity Heritage Scenic Byway	0.00	0							
Turquoise Trail	0.00	0						Also a NSB	
Utah's Patchwork Parkway	0.00	0							
West Cascades Scenic Byway	0.00	0						Also a NSB	
West Elk Loop	0.00	0							
White Mountain Scenic Road	0.00	0							
White Mountain Trail	0.00	0						Also a NSB	
White Pass Scenic Byway	0.00	0							
Whitefish Bay Scenic Byway	27.14	43.68	Michigan	Hiawatha	M-123 in Whitefish Township	Lakeshore Drive in Bay Mills Township	February 8, 1989	Runs along Whitefish Bay in the Upper Peninsula of Michigan	
Wyoming Centennial Scenic Byway	0.00	0							
Yuba-Donner Scenic Byway	0.00	0							
Zilpo Road	0.00	0							
