= Rangeley Lakes Scenic Byway =

Road in Maine, USA

Route information
- Length: 35.6 mi (57.3 km)
- Existed: June 15, 2000–present

Major junctions
- From: SR 4 near Madrid
- To: SR 17 near Houghton

Location
- Country: United States
- State: Maine

Highway system
- Maine State Highway System; Interstate; US; State; Auto trails; Lettered highways

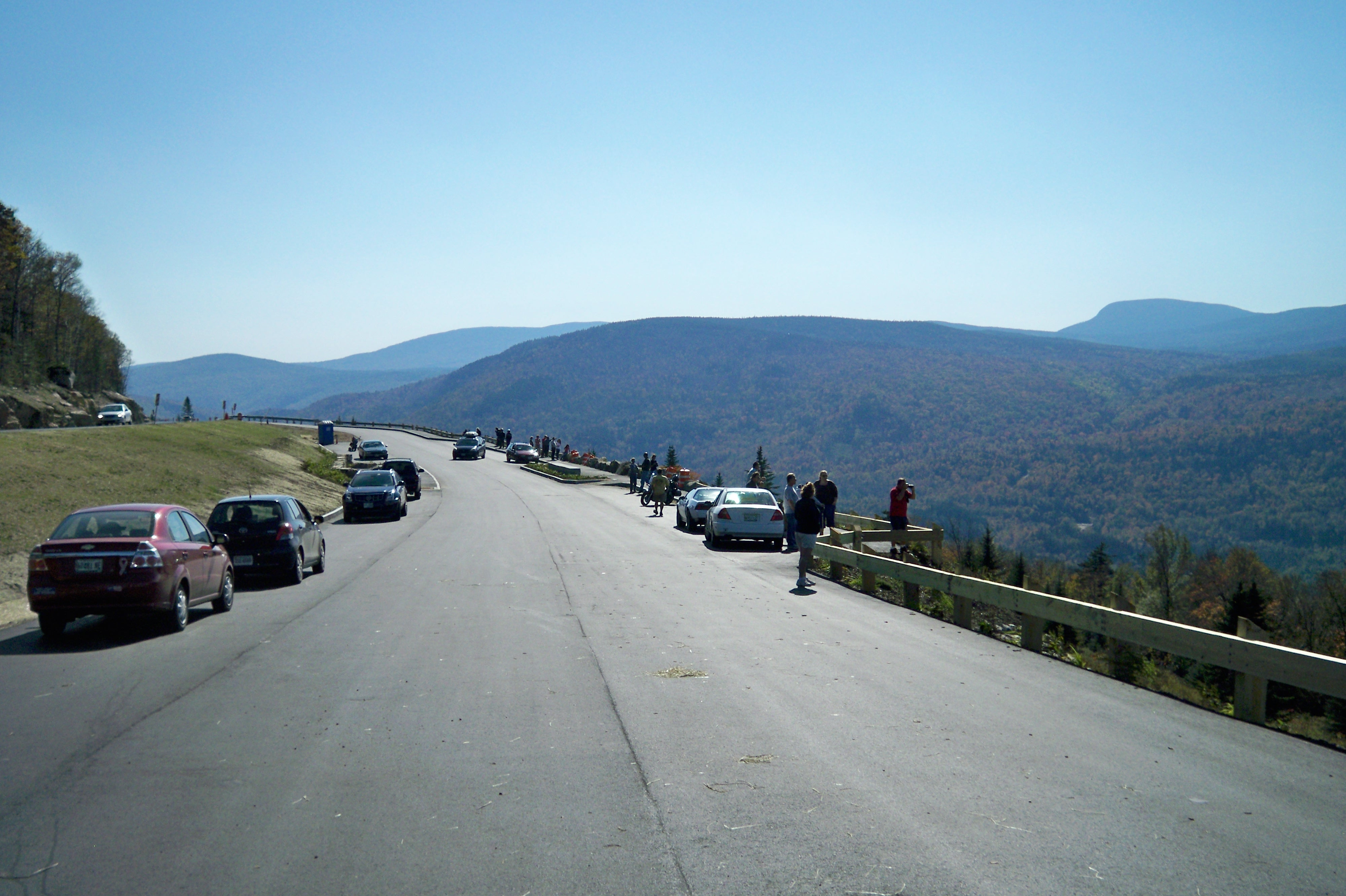
Rangeley Lakes Scenic Byway

The Rangeley Lakes Scenic Byway is a National Scenic Byway in the US state of Maine. This byway follows State Route 17 (SR 17) and SR 4 in the western part of the state which is home to the many lakes and streams for which the region is known. The Rangeley Lakes Scenic Byway begins on SR 4 outside the town of Rangeley and then continues on SR 17 after wrapping around Rangeley Lake. The route follows the ridgeline of the Appalachian Mountains before dropping into hills and valleys.
