= Black River (Gogebic County) =

River in Michigan, United States

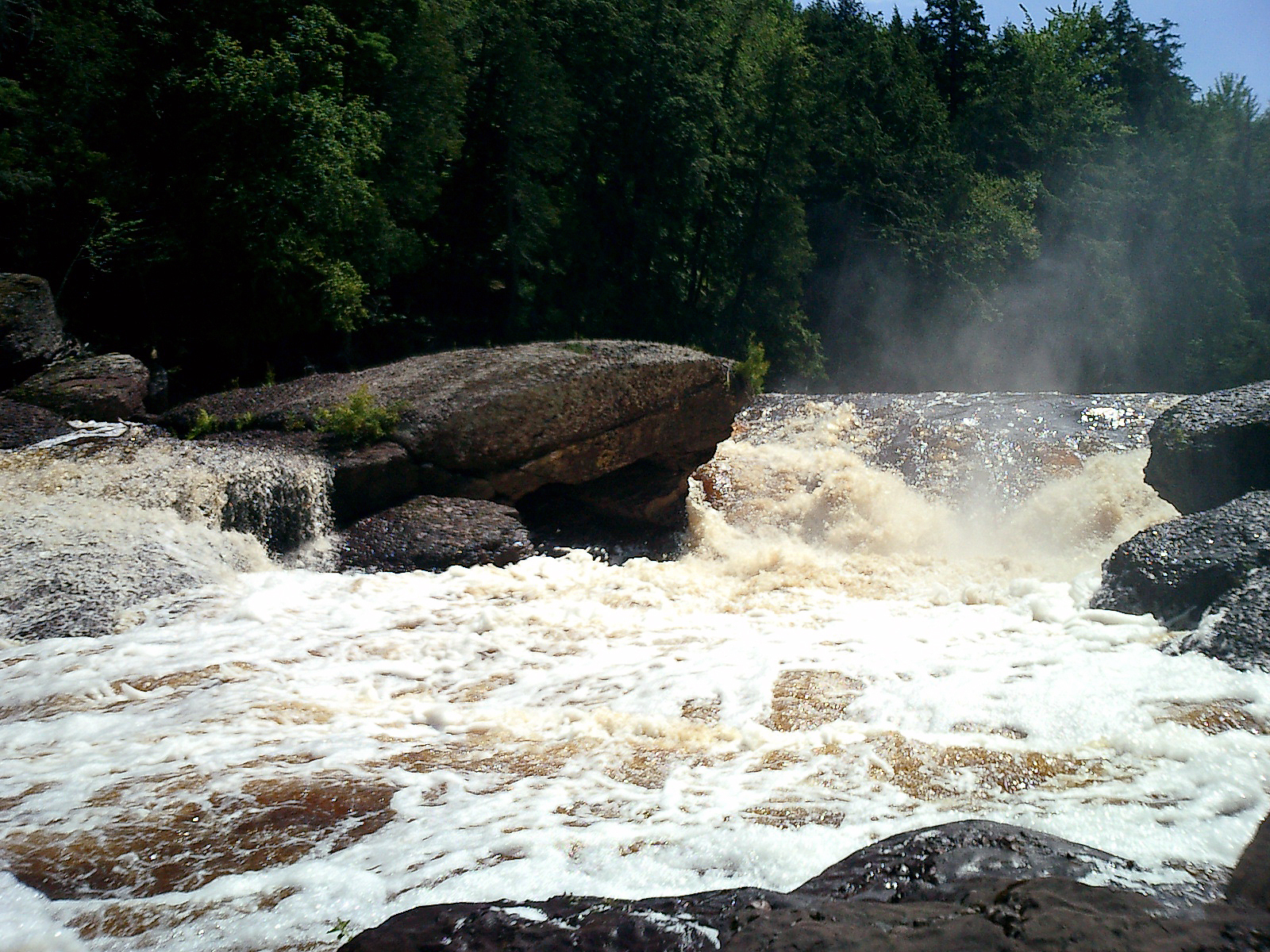

Location
- Country: United States

Physical characteristics
- Mouth
  - location: Lake Superior
  - elevation: 600 ft (180 m)

National Wild and Scenic River
- Type: Scenic
- Designated: March 3, 1992

The Black River is a 41.1-mile-long (66.1 km) river on the Upper Peninsula of the U.S. state of Michigan, flowing mostly in Gogebic County into Lake Superior at . Its source at is a boreal wetland on the border with Iron County, Wisconsin. The northern section of the river, 14 miles (23 km) within the boundaries of the Ottawa National Forest, was designated a National Wild and Scenic River in 1992.

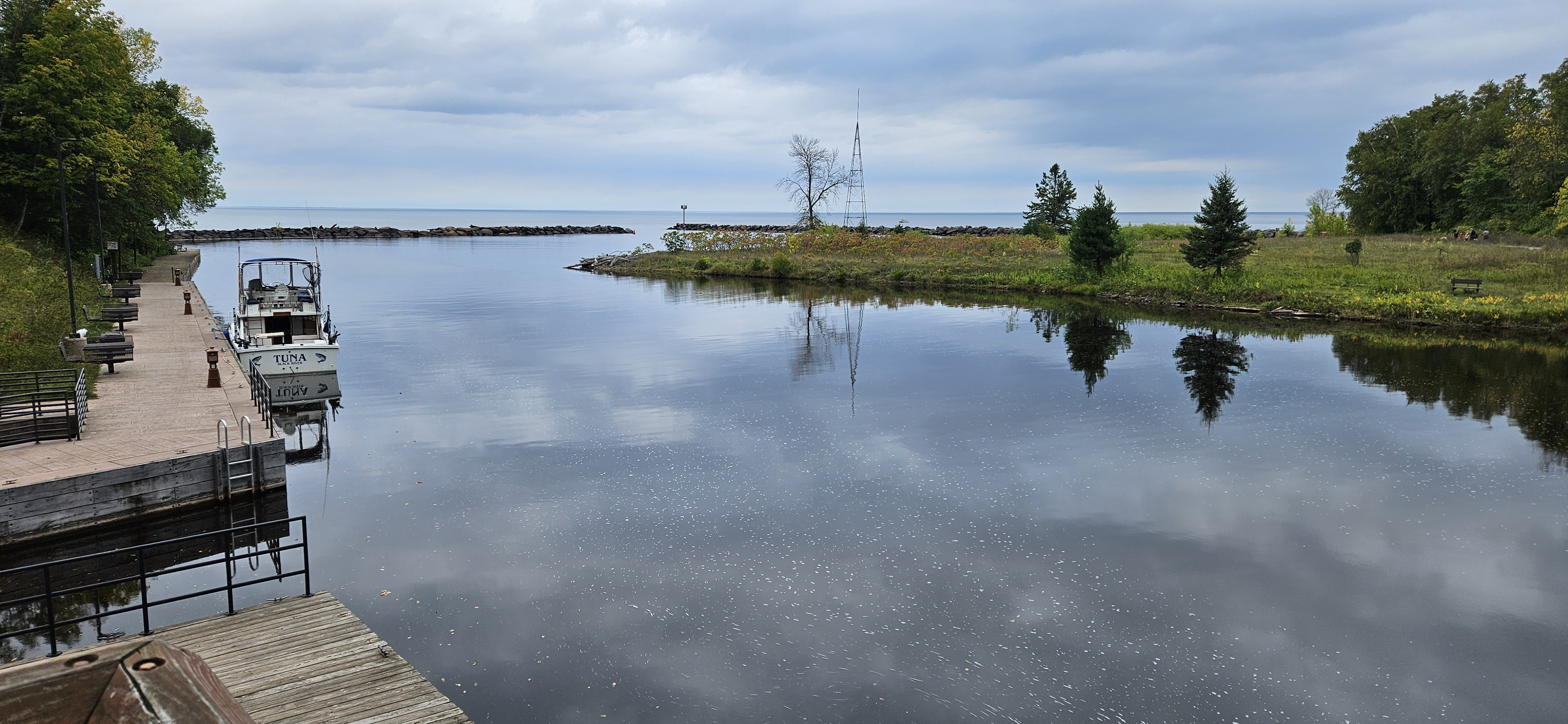
Looking out at Lake Superior and Black River Harbor

At the Lake Superior mouth of the Black River is Black River Harbor, a former fishing station where commercial fishermen brought in cargoes of lake trout. The North Country Trail crosses the river here via a suspension footbridge.

== Waterfalls ==
The Wild and Scenic River section of the Black River of Gogebic County is known for the many waterfalls produced as the river tumbles down from near Copper Peak to Lake Superior. The river drops more than 200 feet (61 m) over five separate named cataracts beginning two miles (3.2 km) from its mouth.

The first three named falls are smaller, farther apart, and have limited access. Some of these waterfalls are easily accessible from the parallel County Road 513 (Black River Road) north of Bessemer, while other waterfalls require a more strenuous hike to see. Roadside trails provide access to Gorge Falls and Potawatomi Falls. The Black River Road was named a National Forest Scenic Byway in 1992. The trails to two of the Black River waterfalls, Gorge and Potawatomi, have been designated National Recreation Trails due to their unique stairway designs (to provide easier access down the steep slopes) and observation platforms.

=== Narrows, Chippewa, and Algonquin Falls ===
The first three waterfalls on the Black River as it approaches Lake Superior are Narrows Falls, Chippewa Falls, and Algonquin Falls. They are the three smallest named waterfalls on the river. Narrows and Algonquin Falls are technically rapids or cascades. Chippewa Falls drops nearly 10 feet (3.0 m) over boulders and dead tree limbs. These area have limited access and are not often visited.

=== Great Conglomerate and Potawatomi Falls ===
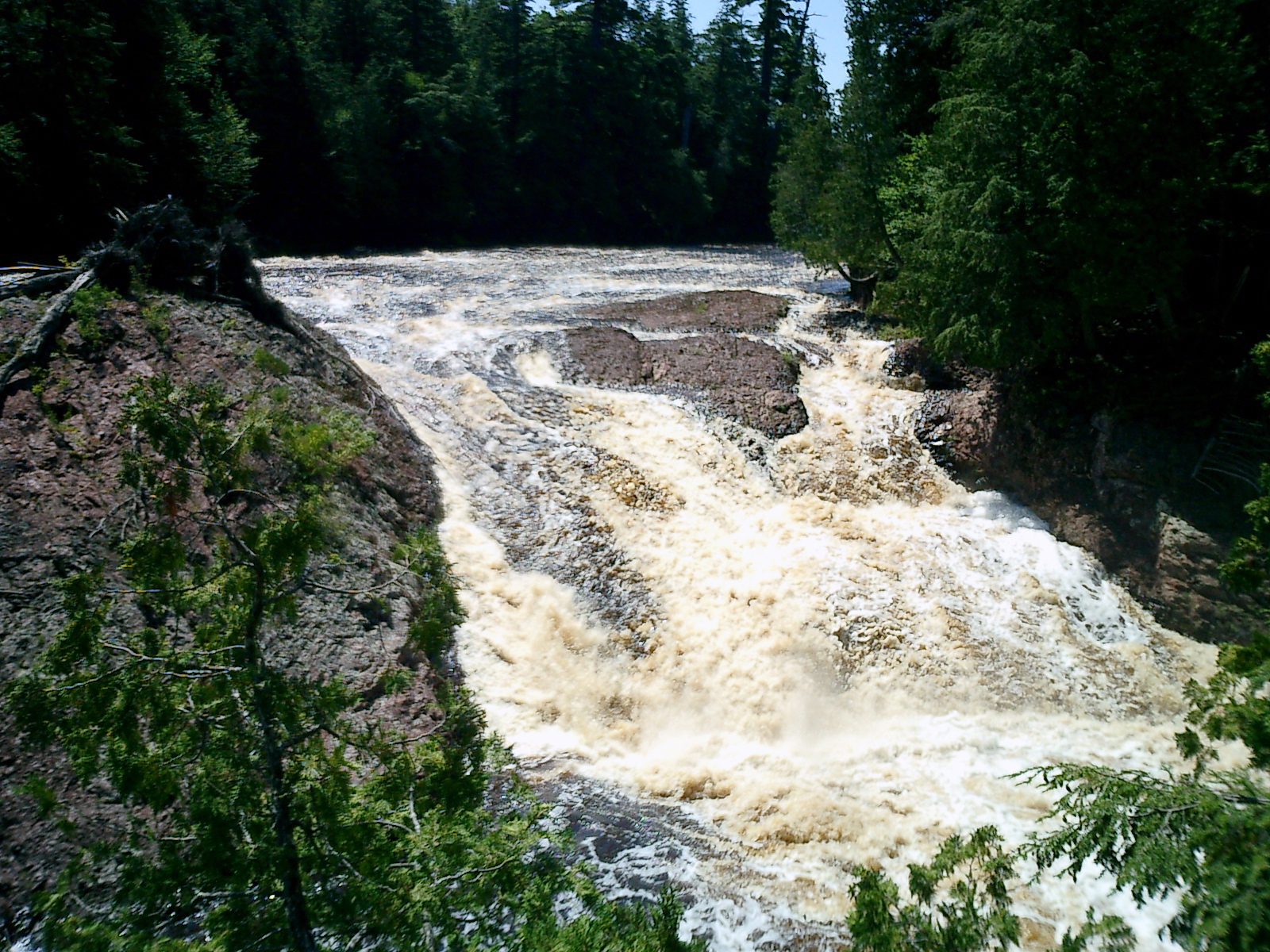
Great Conglomerate Falls

Great Conglomerate Falls is the southernmost (the Black River flows north) of the more publicized falls and the first large waterfall on the river's approach to Lake Superior. The river drops 30 feet (9.1 m) around a large piece of conglomerate rock, boulders and tree trunks into a deep gorge. Potawatomi Falls then drops nearly 40 feet (12 m) in two sections around a piece of conglomerate rock, similar to Great Conglomerate Falls.

=== Gorge and Sandstone Falls ===
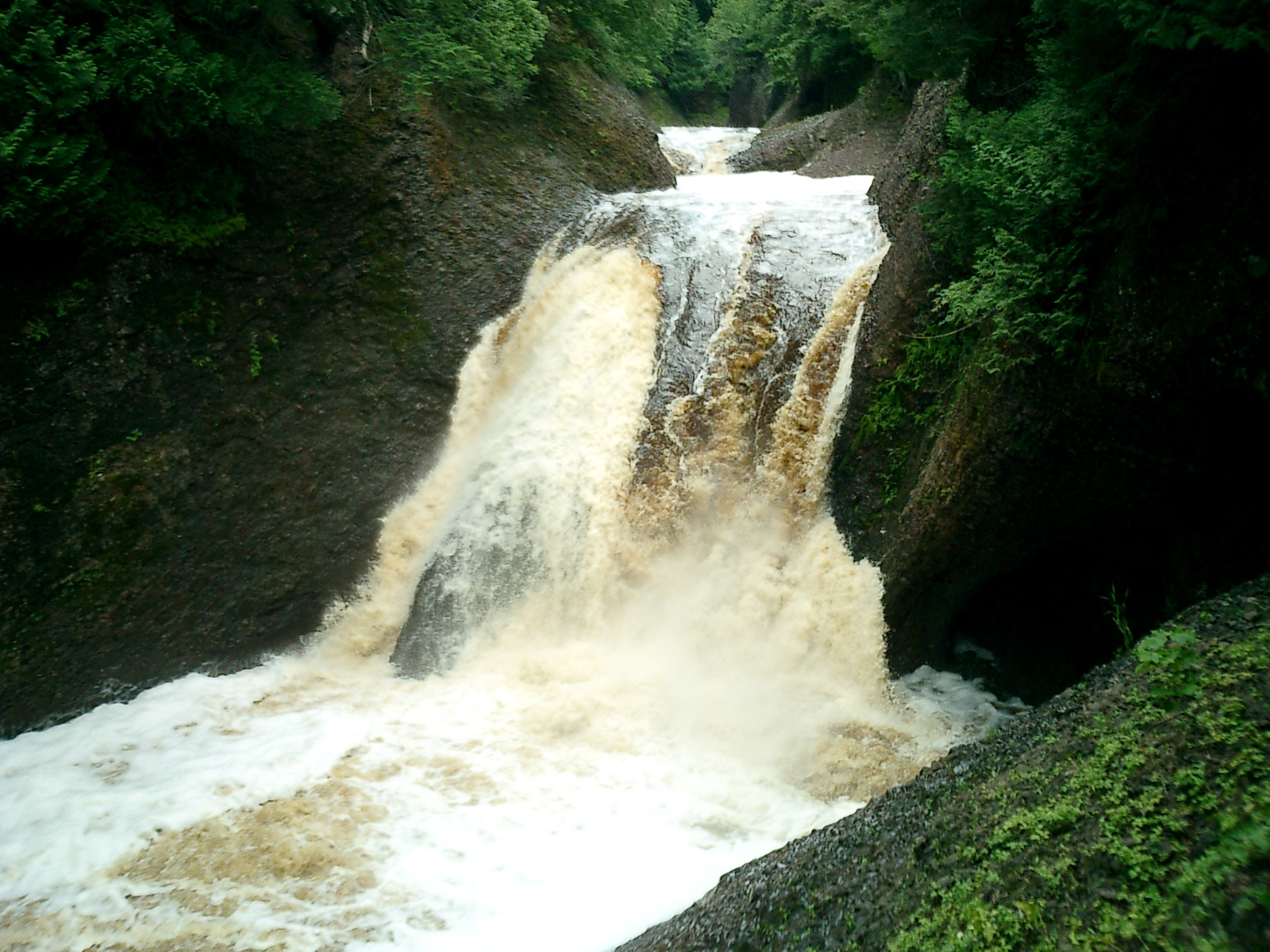
Gorge Falls

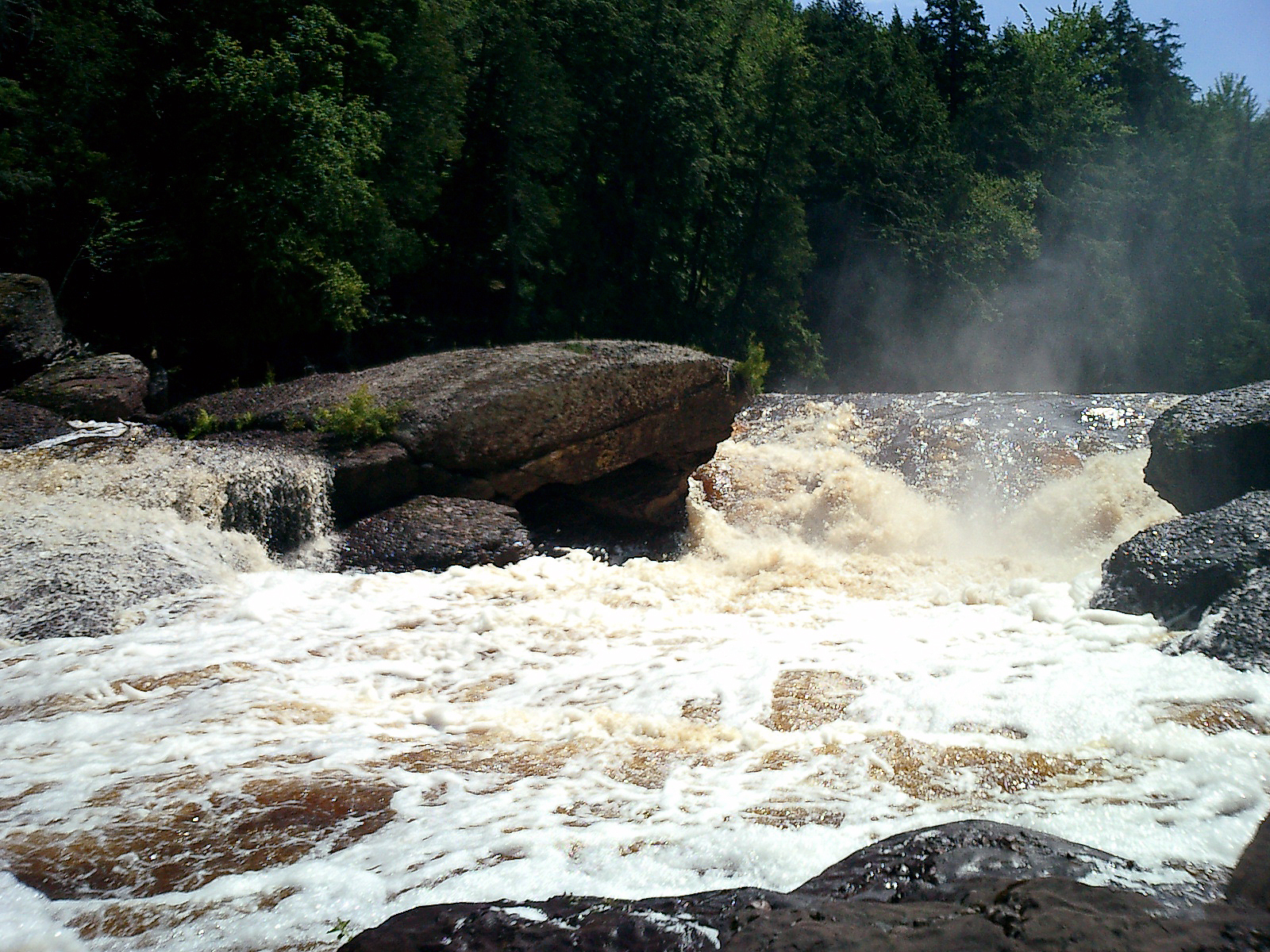
Sandstone Falls

At Gorge Falls, 46.6403°N 90.0502°W, the Black River constricts to about seven feet (2.1 m) across and drops 20 feet (6.1 m) into a steep gorge, creating masses of foam as the water falls against the rocks below. Sandstone Falls drops a total of 25 feet (7.6 m) in two sections, a five-foot (1.5 m) initial drop (pictured) and a 20-foot (6.1 m) second drop. Sandstone Falls is named for the sandstone rocks along the riverbed that the river has cut channels through.

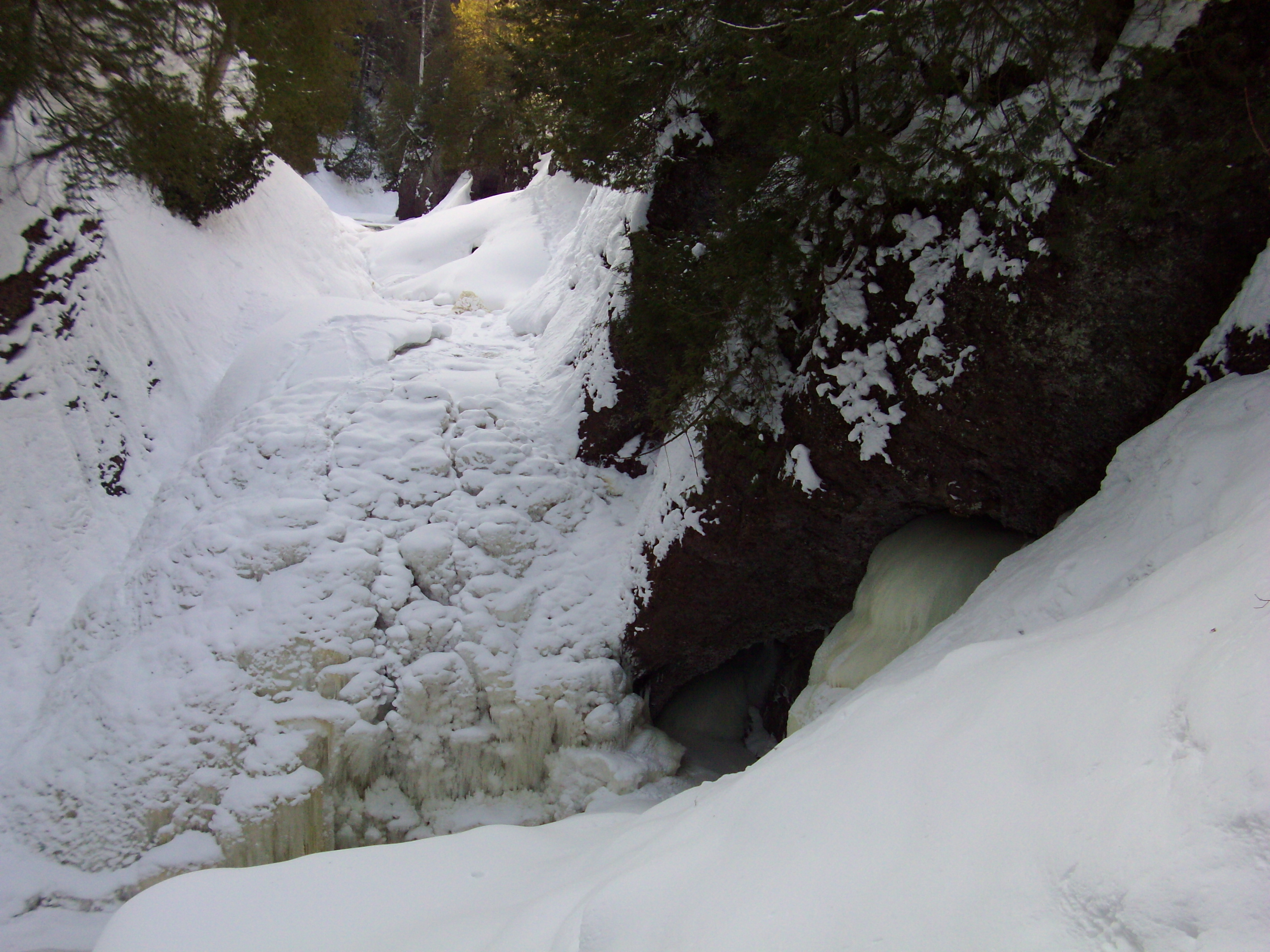
Gorge Falls in winter

=== Rainbow Falls ===
Rainbow Falls is the northernmost waterfall on the Black River, less than one mile (1.6 km) from Lake Superior. It is also the highest. Here, the water drops 45 feet (14 m) down into a rocky gorge. The waterfall creates much mist, which, on sunny days, creates a constant rainbow. The approach to this waterfall is strenuous: 200 steps are built on staircases and into the side of the hill, creating a very steep approach.

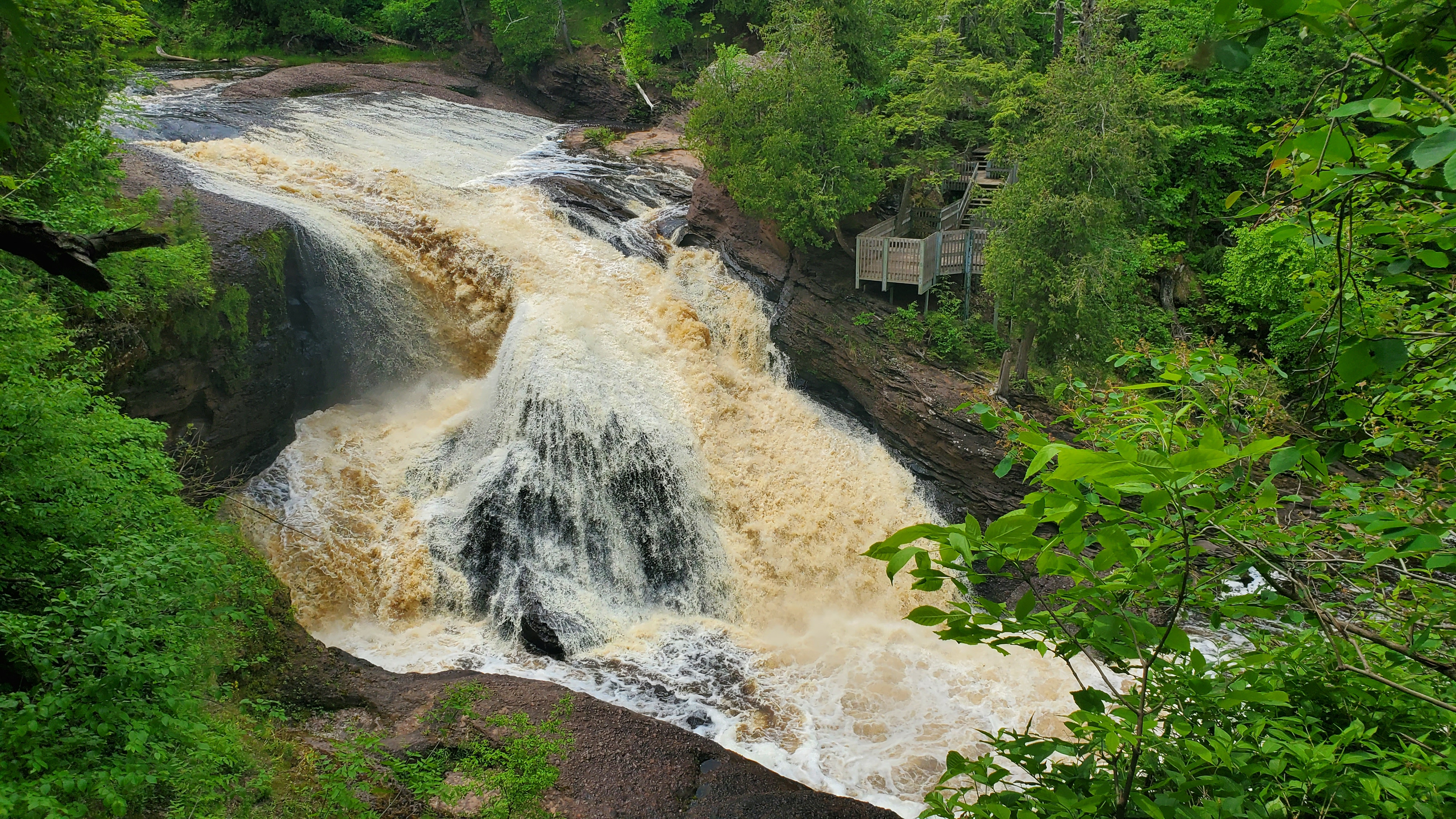
Rainbow Falls

== Tributaries and features ==
From the mouth:

- Rainbow Falls
- (left) Sagaigan Creek
  - Sagaigan Lake
- Sandstone Falls
- Gorge Falls
- Potawatomi Falls
- Great Conglomerate Falls
- (left) Sand Island Creek
- Algonquin Falls
- (left) Kirby Creek
- Chippewa Falls
- (right) Reed Creek
- (left) Narrows Creek
- (left) Montowibo Creek
- (left) Sapsucker Creek
- (right) Sixmile Creek
- (right) Powder Mill Creek
  - (left) Sellwood Creek
- (right) Kallander Creek
  - Bessemer
- (left) Abitosse Creek
- (left) Jackson Creek
  - (right) Planter Creek
  - (left) Berranger Creek
  - (left) Connor Creek
  - (left) Bowden Creek
  - (left) Finnegan Creek
  - (left) Alward Creek
  - (right) McVichie Creek
- Gabbro Falls
- Neepikon Falls
- (left) Little Black River
  - Sunday Lake
  - Wakefield
- Ramsay
- (left) Sunset Creek
- Granite Falls
- (left) Hosking Creek
- (left) Devils Creek
- (right) Palms Creek
- (left) McDonald Creek
  - McDonald Lake
    - (left) Bice Creek
    - (left) Mosinee Creek
- (right) Wester Creek
- (left) Underwood Creek
- Black River Lake
