= New Mexico State Road 15 =

State highway in New Mexico, United States

State Road 15

Route information
- Maintained by NMDOT
- Length: 44.314 mi (71.316 km)

Major junctions
- South end: US 180 in Silver City
- NM 35 near Lake Roberts
- North end: Gila Cliff Dwellings National Monument

Location
- Country: United States
- State: New Mexico
- Counties: Grant, Catron

Highway system
- New Mexico State Highway System; Interstate; US; State; Scenic
← NM 14	→ NM 16

State Road 15 (NM 15) is a state highway in the US state of New Mexico. Its total length is approximately 44.3 miles (71.3 km). NM 15's southern terminus is in the village of Silver City at U.S. Route 180 (US 180), and the northern terminus is a dead end by Cliff Dweller Canyon which is near Gila Cliff Dwellings National Monument.

== Major intersections ==
County	Location	mi	km	Destinations	Notes
Grant	Silver City	0.000	0.000	US 180	Southern terminus
Grant		25.2	40.6	NM 35 south	Northern terminus of NM 35
Catron		44.314	71.316	Dead end	Northern terminus
1.000 mi = 1.609 km; 1.000 km = 0.621 mi
