= Great Conglomerate Falls =

Waterfall in Michigan, United States

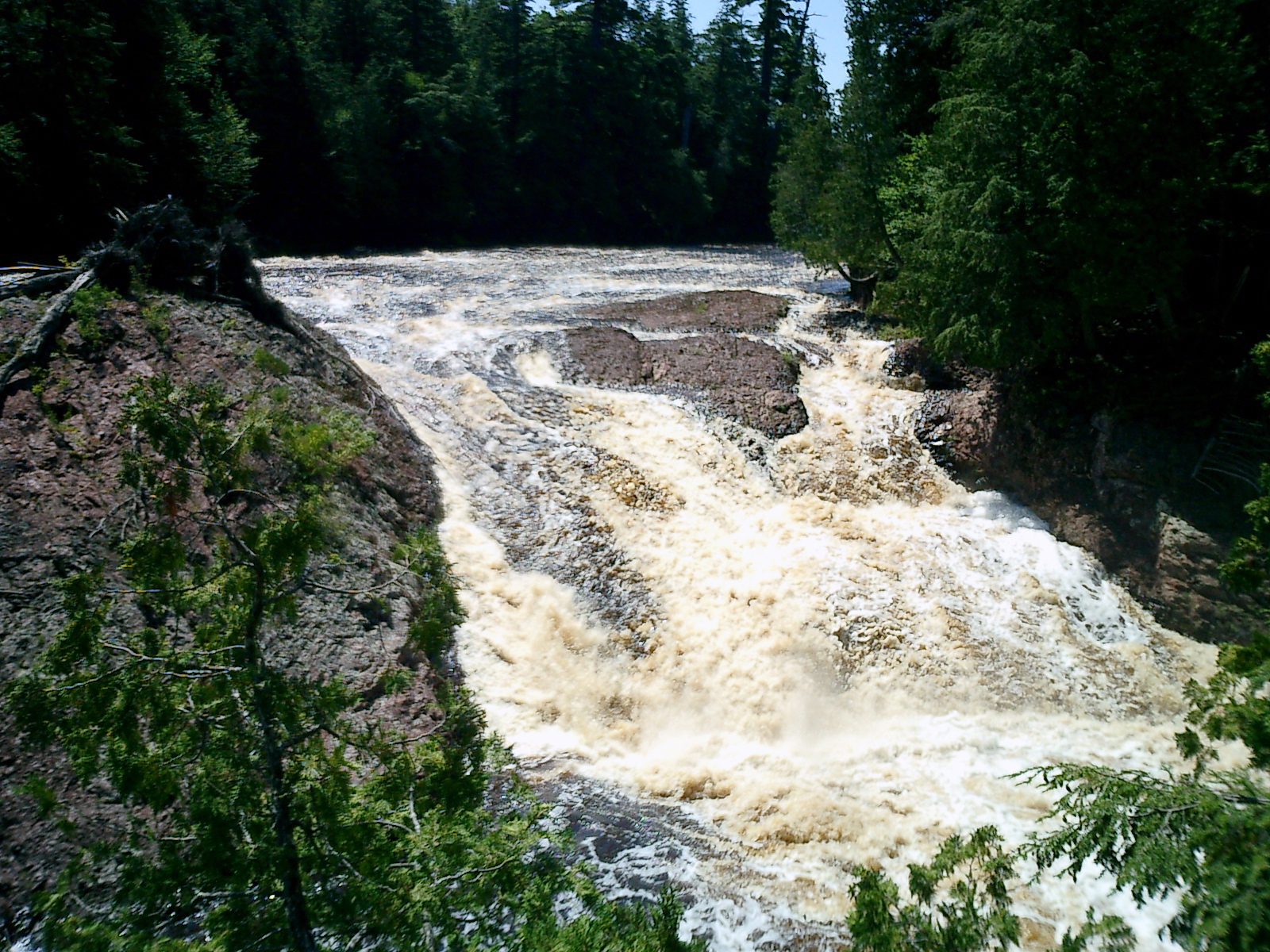
- Interactive map of Great Conglomerate Falls
- Location: Gogebic County, Michigan
- Coordinates: 46.63244°N 90.05517°W
- Type: Cascade
- Total height: 30 feet (9.1 m)
- Number of drops: 1
- Watercourse: Black River

Great Conglomerate Falls is a 30 feet (9.1 m) waterfall on the Black River in Michigan. It is split into two drops in the summertime when water is lower. The falls takes its name from the large conglomerate outcropping in the middle of the river that forms its segmented appearance.
