= New Mexico State Road 35 =

State highway in New Mexico, United States

State Road 35

Route information
- Maintained by NMDOT
- Length: 27.520 mi (44.289 km)

Major junctions
- South end: NM 152 in San Lorenzo
- North end: NM 15 near Lake Roberts

Location
- Country: United States
- State: New Mexico
- Counties: Grant

Highway system
- New Mexico State Highway System; Interstate; US; State; Scenic
← NM 34	→ NM 36

State Road 35 (NM 35) is a 27.520-mile-long (44.289 km) state highway in the U.S. state of New Mexico. Its southern terminus is in the village of San Lorenzo at NM 152, and the northern terminus is at NM 15.

== Major intersections ==
County	Location	mi	km	Destinations	Notes
Grant	San Lorenzo	0.000	0.000	NM 152 – Kingston, Santa Rita, Hillsboro, Silver City	Southern terminus
Grant		27.520	44.289	NM 15	Northern terminus
1.000 mi = 1.609 km; 1.000 km = 0.621 mi
