= Lake Roberts, New Mexico =

- Census-designated place
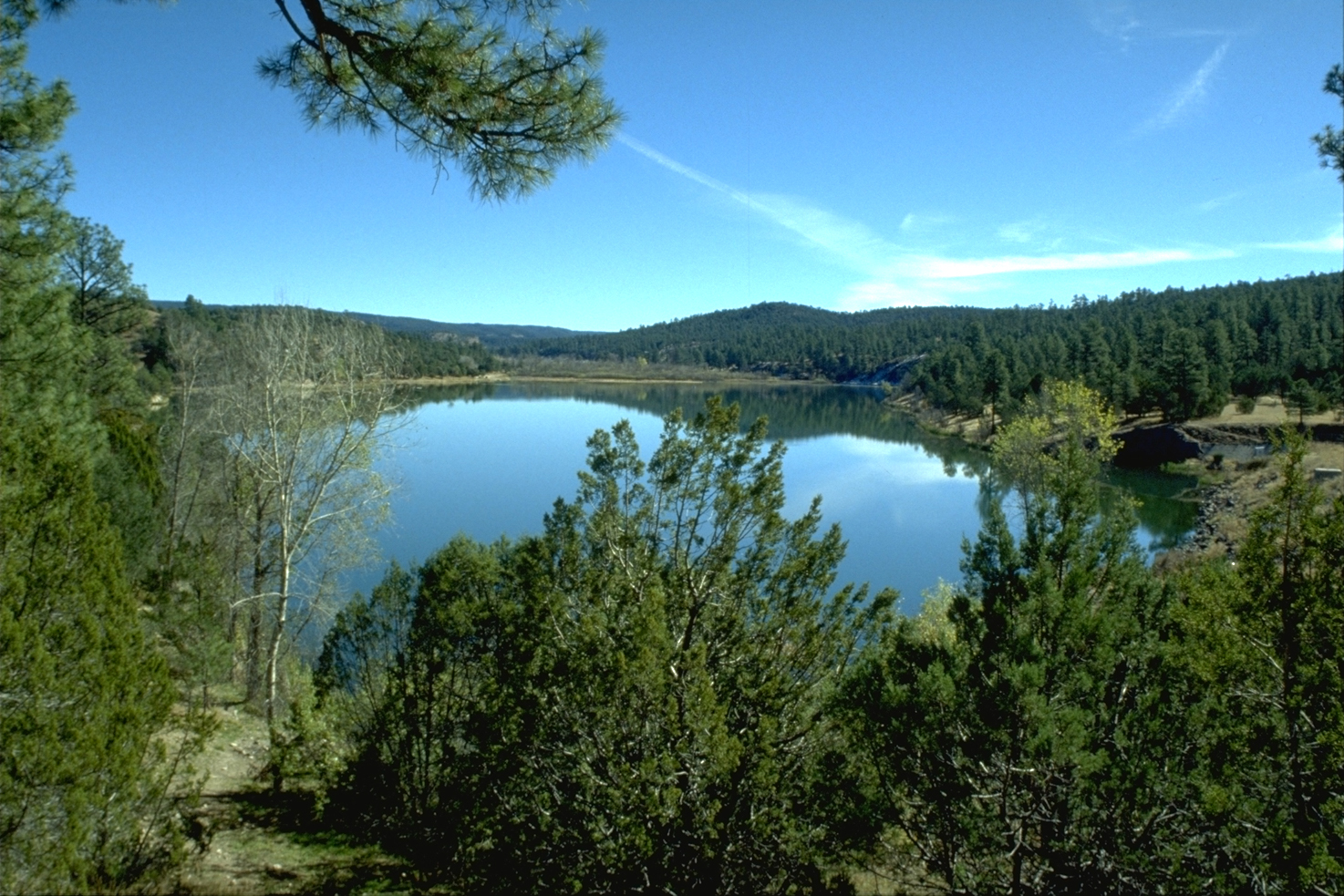
- Lake Roberts shimmers in the afternoon sunshine.

- Location within New Mexico Location within the United States
- Coordinates: 33°01′53″N 108°10′08″W
- Country: United States
- State: New Mexico
- County: Grant

Area
  - Total: 0.28 sq mi (0.73 km^{2})
  - Land: 0.28 sq mi (0.73 km^{2})
  - Water: 0 sq mi (0.00 km^{2})
- Elevation: 6,001 ft (1,829 m)

Population (2020)
  - Total: 53
  - Density: 187.1/sq mi (72.23/km^{2})
- Time zone: UTC-7 (Mountain (MST))
  - Summer (DST): UTC-6 (MDT)
- Area code: 575
- GNIS feature ID: 2584126

Lake Roberts is a census-designated place in Grant County, New Mexico, United States. As of the 2020 census, Lake Roberts had a population of 53. New Mexico State Road 35 passes through the community.

== Geography ==
According to the U.S. Census Bureau, the community has an area of 0.283 square miles (0.73 km^{2}), all land.

== Demographics ==
Historical population
Census	Pop.	Note	%±
2020	53		—
U.S. Decennial Census
