= National Parkway =

Protected roadway operated by the U.S. National Park Service

National Parkways
- Logo for the National Park Service

Highway names
- Interstates: Interstate nn (I-nn)
- US Highways: U.S. Highway nn, U.S. Route nn (US nn)
- State: Varies by state

System links
- Scenic Byways; National; National Forest; BLM; NPS

A National Parkway is a designation for a protected area in the United States given to scenic roadways with a protected corridor of surrounding parkland. National Parkways often connect cultural or historic sites. The U.S. National Park Service manages the parkways.

== History ==
=== Parkways ===
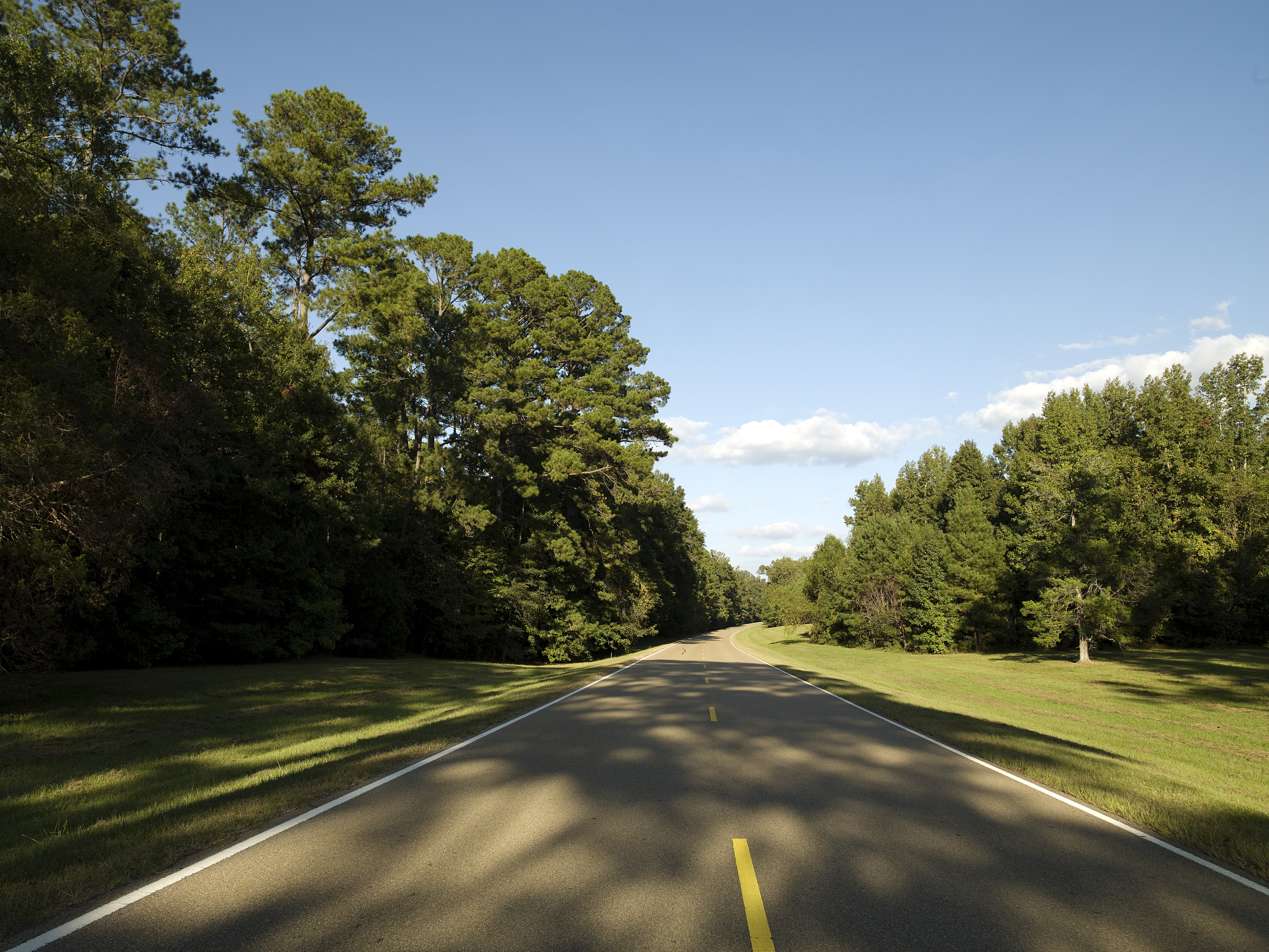
The Natchez Trace Parkway

The first parkways in the United States were developed in the late 19th century by landscape architects Frederick Law Olmsted and Beatrix Farrand as roads segregated for pedestrians, bicyclists, equestrians, and horse carriages, such as the Eastern Parkway and Ocean Parkway in Brooklyn, New York. The terminology "parkway" to define this type of road was coined by Calvert Vaux and Olmsted in their proposal to link city and suburban parks with "pleasure roads." Newer roads such as the Bidwell and Lincoln Parkways in Buffalo, New York, were designed for automobiles and are broad and divided by large landscaped central medians. Parkways can be the approach to large urban parks, such as the Mystic Valley Parkway to Boston Common in Boston. Some separated express lanes from local lanes, though this was not always the case.

During the early 20th century, the meaning of the word was expanded to include controlled-access highways designed for recreational driving of automobiles with landscaping. These parkways originally provided scenic routes without at-grade intersections, very slow vehicles, or pedestrian traffic. Their success led to more development however, expanding a city's boundaries, eventually limiting their recreational driving use. The Arroyo Seco Parkway between Downtown Los Angeles and Pasadena, California, is an example of lost pastoral aesthetics. It and others have become major commuting routes, while retaining the name parkway.

=== National parkways ===
In the 1930s, as part of the New Deal, the U.S. federal government constructed national parkways designed for recreational driving, and to commemorate historic trails and routes. As with other roads through national parks, these mostly undivided and two-lane parkways have lower speed limits, and are maintained by the National Park Service and the Federal Highway Administration jointly through the Federal Lands Transportation Program. An example is the Civilian Conservation Corps-built Blue Ridge Parkway in the Appalachian Mountains of North Carolina and Virginia. Others are: Skyline Drive in Virginia; John D. Rockefeller, Jr. Memorial Parkway in Wyoming, the Natchez Trace Parkway in Mississippi, Alabama, and Tennessee; and the Colonial Parkway in eastern Virginia's Historic Triangle area. The George Washington Memorial Parkway and the Clara Barton Parkway, running along the Potomac River near Washington, D.C., were also constructed during this era.

== List ==
Four parkways are stand-alone units of the National Park System: Blue Ridge Parkway, George Washington Parkway, John D. Rockefeller Memorial Parkway, and Natchez Trace Parkway. Others are managed as part of another unit.

Name	Length (mi)	Length (km)	Southern or western terminus	Northern or eastern terminus	Date	Description	Ref(s).
Baltimore–Washington Parkway	30.5	49.1	US 50 / MD 201 in Cheverly, MD	Russell Street in Baltimore, MD	December 1950	Original envisioned in Pierre Charles L'Enfant's original layout for Washington, DC, in the 18th century; part of Greenbelt Park	
Blue Ridge Parkway	469.1	754.9	US 441 in Swain County, NC	US 250/Skyline Drive in Rockfish Gap, VA	June 30, 1936	America's longest linear park; runs mostly along the Blue Ridge, a major mountain chain that is part of the Appalachian Mountains. Continues past northern terminus as Skyline Drive.	
Clara Barton Parkway	6.8	10.9	MacArthur Boulevard in Carderock, MD	Canal Road in Washington, DC	1930	Built as the Maryland portion of the George Washington Memorial Parkway	
Colonial Parkway	23.0	37.0	Historic Jamestowne in Jamestown, VA	SR 1020 in Yorktown, VA	1937	Links the three points of Virginia's Historic Triangle: Jamestown, Williamsburg, and Yorktown; part of Colonial National Historical Park	
Foothills Parkway	26.8	43.1	US 129 in Chilhowee, TN US 321 near Walland, TN	US 321 in Cosby, TN I-40 near Hartford, TN	February 22, 1944	Exists in two segments with a spur connecting to US 321 / US 441 in Gatlinburg and Pigeon Forge; administered by Great Smoky Mountains National Park	
George Washington Memorial Parkway	24.9	40.1	SR 235 in Mount Vernon, VA SR 400 in Alexandria, VA	SR 400 in Alexandria, VA I-495 in Langley, VA	May 29, 1930	Exists in two segments; the northern one also passes through Washington, DC	
John D. Rockefeller Jr. Memorial Parkway	27.0	43.5	North boundary of Grand Teton National Park	West Thumb Geyser Basin in Yellowstone National Park	August 25, 1972	Scenic road that connects the two national parks and named for John D. Rockefeller Jr., a conservationist and philanthropist	
Natchez Trace Parkway	444.0	714.5	Liberty Road in Natchez, MS	SR 100 in Nashville, TN	May 8, 1938	Commemorates the historic Old Natchez Trace and preserves sections of the original trail; also passes through Alabama	
Rock Creek and Potomac Parkway	2.9	4.7	Lincoln Memorial Circle in the National Mall, Washington, DC	Shoreham Drive / Beach Drive in Rock Creek Park, Washington, DC	1944	Part of Rock Creek Park	
Skyline Drive	105.5	169.8	US 250/Blue Ridge Parkway in Rockfish Gap, VA	US 340 near Front Royal, VA	1939	Part of the Shenandoah National Park, continues past southern terminus as Blue Ridge Parkway	
Suitland Parkway	9.1	14.6	I-295 / South Capitol Street in Washington, DC	MD 4 in Forestville, MD	December 9, 1944	Built to connect military facilities during World War II; connects to Andrews Air Force Base, administered by National Capital Parks-East	

The Great River Road was originally envisioned as a National Parkway.

== See also ==
- Scenic byways in the United States
