= List of Colorado Scenic and Historic Byways =

Colorado Scenic and Historic Byways
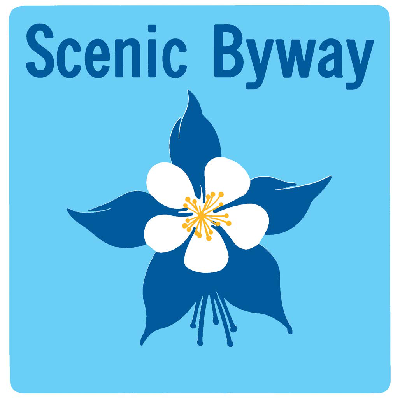
- Colorado Scenic and Historic Byway route sign

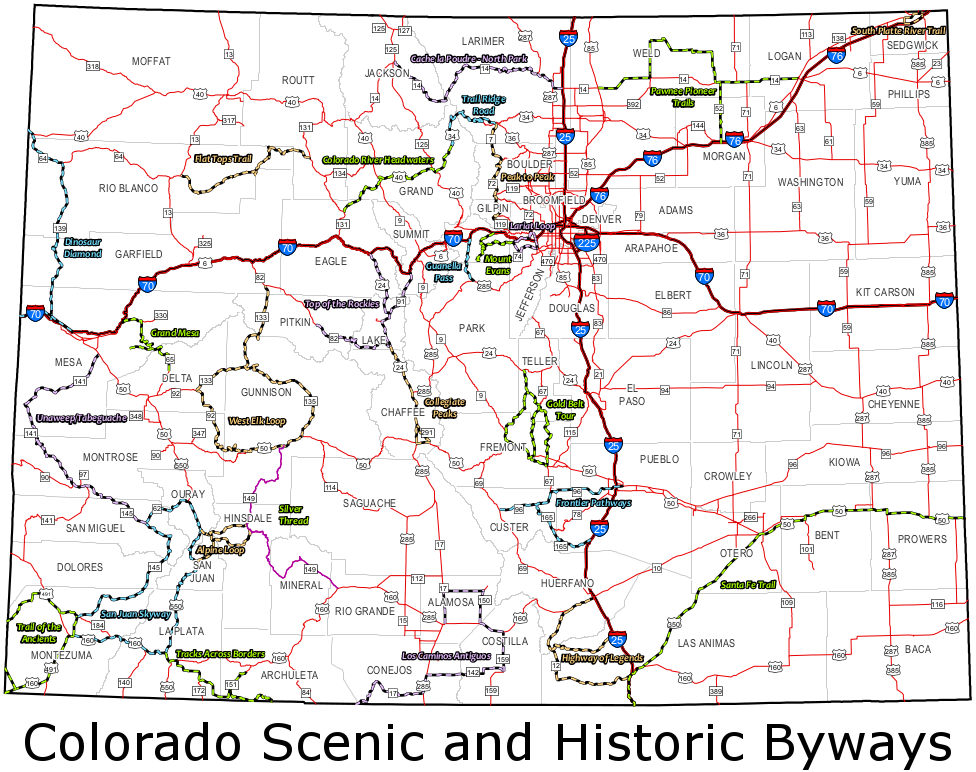

Highway names
- Interstates: Interstate nn (I-nn)
- US Highways: U.S. Highway nn (US nn)
- State: State Highway nn (SH nn)
- County: County Road nn (CR nn)
- Forest: Forest Road nnn (FR nnn)

System links
- Colorado State Highway System; Interstate; US; State; Scenic

Colorado Scenic and Historic Byways are highway and backroad routes in the U.S. state of Colorado designated by the Colorado Scenic and Historic Byways Commission for their scenic and historic values. These byways follow existing roads or highways and are signed with a Colorado blue columbine (the Colorado state flower) logo denoting the route. The Colorado Scenic and Historic Byways Program was established in March 1989, and is one of the oldest state scenic byway programs. Since 1989, the program has designated 26 Colorado Scenic and Historic Byways with 2,585 miles (4,160 km) of roadway, 4,459 miles (7,176 km) including scenic byway extensions in adjacent states.

In addition to state scenic byway designations, four federal agencies designate specific types of scenic byways:

1. The Federal Highway Administration designates National Scenic Byways and All-American Roads (the highest designation.)
2. The National Park Service administers congressionally authorized National Parkways.
3. The United States Forest Service designates and manages National Forest Scenic Byways in National Forests and National Grasslands.
4. The Bureau of Land Management designates and manages Back Country Byways in areas managed by the BLM.

The Colorado Scenic and Historic Byways Commission works closely with these four federal agencies to select scenic and historic byways that meet federal criteria. Of the 26 current Colorado designated byways, 21 already have a federal designation as well. These include two All-American Roads, 11 National Scenic Byways, ten National Forest Scenic Byways, and three Back Country Byways.

The 13 combined All-American Roads and National Scenic Byways in Colorado are currently the most of any state. Five Colorado byways currently have two federal designations. The San Juan Skyway Scenic and Historic Byway is both an All-American Road and a National Forest Scenic Byway. The Grand Mesa National Scenic Byway, the Highway of Legends National Scenic Byway, and the Silver Thread Scenic and Historic Byway are both National Scenic Byways and National Forest Scenic Byways. The Gold Belt Tour Scenic and Historic Byway is both a National Scenic Byway and a Back Country Byway.

== Colorado Scenic and Historic Byways Commission ==
The Colorado Scenic and Historic Byways Commission was established in 1989 to administer the Colorado Scenic and Historic Byways Program. The Governor of Colorado appoints the members of the commission.

The program is a statewide partnership intended to provide recreational, educational, and economic benefits to residents and visitors by designating, interpreting, protecting, and promoting a system of outstanding touring routes in Colorado.

Proposed routes are nominated by local communities and approved by the Commission, but byway development is managed at the local level.

The Commission works with:

- State agencies including the Colorado Department of Transportation, the Colorado Department of Natural Resources, the Colorado Department of Local Affairs, and the Colorado Tourism Office;
- Federal agencies including the National Park Service, the United States Forest Service, the Bureau of Land Management, and the Federal Highway Administration;
- County and municipal governments;
- Local byways organizations, community organizations, interested individuals, and public and private resources;
- Scenic byway programs in the seven adjacent states of Wyoming, Nebraska, Kansas, Oklahoma, New Mexico, Arizona, and Utah.

The Commission uses the following criteria to select potential byways:

1. The proposed Scenic and Historic Byway must possess unusual, exceptional, and distinctive scenic, recreational, historical, educational, scientific, geological, natural, wildlife, cultural, or ethnic features.
2. The proposed Scenic and Historic Byway must be suitable for the prescribed types of vehicular use.
3. The proposed Scenic and Historic Byway must be an existing route and have legal public access.
4. The proposed Scenic and Historic Byway must have strong local support and proponents must demonstrate coordination with relevant agencies.
5. The proposed Scenic and Historic Byway must be accompanied by a conceptual plan, as specified in the nomination process.

The Commission favors proposed byways with both scenic and historic features. Byways with predominantly scenic features are labeled a "Scenic Byway" or a "National Scenic Byway" if also an All-American Road or a National Scenic Byway. Byways with predominantly historic features are labeled a "Historic Byway". Byways with both strong scenic and historic features are labeled a "Scenic and Historic Byway".

== List ==
Table of the 26 Colorado Scenic and Historic Byways
Name	Length (Note: Total scenic byway length in Colorado and adjacent states)	Southern or western terminus	Northern or eastern terminus	Date	Description	Ref
Alpine Loop Back Country Byway	63 miles 101 km	Loop from Ouray to Engineer Pass, (Note: Engineer Pass has an elevation of 12,800 feet (3,901 m).) Capitol City, (Note: Capitol City is a ghost town that was once proposed to replace Denver as the state capital of Colorado. The foundation of the would-be state capitol building remains.) Lake City, Lake San Cristobal, Cinnamon Pass, (Note: Cinnamon Pass has an elevation of 12,640 feet (3,853 m).) and back to Ouray, or on to Animas Forks and Silverton (Note: The Silverton Historic District, the Durango and Silverton Narrow Gauge Railroad, and the Shenandoah-Dives (Mayflower) Mill on the Alpine Loop Back Country Byway are National Historic Landmarks.)		1989	This byway traverses the rugged San Juan Mountains of southwestern Colorado; also a Back Country Byway. (Note: Most of the Alpine Loop Back Country Byway is on unimproved roads that require a high-clearance four-wheel-drive vehicle.) (Note: A portion of this byway is closed in late autumn, winter, and early spring.)	
Cache la Poudre-North Park Scenic Byway	101 miles 163 km	Walden	Fort Collins	1991	This byway explores Poudre Canyon, Cameron Pass, (Note: Cameron Pass has an elevation of 10,276 feet (3,132 m).) and North Park in north-central Colorado; also a National Forest Scenic Byway	
Collegiate Peaks Scenic Byway	57 miles 92 km	Poncha Springs or Salida	SH 82 north of Granite	2015	This byway follows the Arkansas River past the majestic Collegiate Peaks in central Colorado.	
Colorado River Headwaters Scenic Byway	80 miles 129 km	State Bridge	Grand Lake	2008	This byway follows the headwaters of the Colorado River in north-central Colorado; also a National Scenic Byway. (Note: A portion of this byway is on gravel road.)	
Dinosaur Diamond Scenic and Historic Byway	134 miles 216 km (Note: The Dinosaur Diamond National Scenic Byway has 134 miles (216 km) of Colorado roadway and the Dinosaur Diamond Prehistoric Highway has 328 miles (528 km) of Utah roadway.)	Loop from Grand Junction to Colorado NM, Fruita, Douglas Pass, Rangely, Dinosaur, Dinosaur NM, Vernal, Duchesne, Price, Green River, Arches NP, Moab, and back to Grand Junction		1997	This byway loops through the dinosaur fossil laden canyon country of northwestern Colorado and northeastern Utah; also a National Scenic Byway.	
Flat Tops Trail Scenic Byway	82 miles 132 km	SH 13 in Meeker	SH 131 in Yampa	1991	This byway traverses the Flat Tops range of northwestern Colorado; also a National Forest Scenic Byway.	
Frontier Pathways Scenic Byway	103 miles 166 km	Westcliffe	I-25 exit 98B in Pueblo or I-25 exit 74	1998	This byway passes through the Wet Mountains region of south-central Colorado; also a National Scenic Byway. (Note: History Colorado operates the El Pueblo History Museum on the Frontier Pathways National Scenic Byway.)	
Gold Belt Tour Scenic and Historic Byway	131 miles 211 km	Loop from Cañon City to Florence, Phantom Canyon, Victor, Cripple Creek, (Note: The Cripple Creek Historic District on the Gold Belt Tour Scenic and Historic Byway is a National Historic Landmark.) Florissant Fossil Beds NM, Florissant, Royal Gorge, and back to Cañon City		2000	This byway explores the historic Gold Belt mining region of central Colorado; also a National Scenic Byway and a Back Country Byway. (Note: The Gold Belt Tour Scenic and Historic Byway has three alternate routes. Vehicles over 25 feet (7.6 m) long are not allowed on the Phantom Canyon Road. The Shelf Road may require a high-clearance four-wheel-drive vehicle. The High Park Road is paved and does not have restrictions. The Garden Park Fossil Area on the Shelf Road is a National Natural Landmark.)	
Grand Mesa Scenic Byway	63 miles 101 km	Cedaredge	I-70 exit 49	1991	This byway crosses the Grand Mesa in western Colorado; also a National Scenic Byway and a National Forest Scenic Byway.	
Guanella Pass Scenic Byway	22 miles 35 km	US 285 near Grant	I-70 exit 232 in Georgetown	1991	This byway crosses the beautiful Front Range mountains of central Colorado; also a National Forest Scenic Byway. (Note: Guanella Pass has an elevation of 11,669 feet (3,557 m).)	
Highway of Legends Scenic Byway	82 miles 132 km	I-25 exit 14 in Trinidad	Walsenburg or Aguilar	2021	This byway circles the historic Spanish Peaks of south-central Colorado; also a National Scenic Byway and a National Forest Scenic Byway. (Note: The Spanish Peaks on the Highway of Legends National Scenic Byway are a National Natural Landmark. Both East Spanish Peak at elevation 12,688 feet (3,867 m) and West Spanish Peak at elevation 13,631 feet (4,155 m) are higher than any point in the United States farther east.)	
Lariat Loop Scenic and Historic Byway	40 miles 64 km	Loop from Golden to Lookout Mountain Park, Genesee Park, Evergreen, Morrison, Red Rocks Park, Dinosaur Ridge, Mount Vernon, Dakota Cut, and back to Golden		2002	This byway explores the Front Range foothills west of Denver; also a National Scenic Byway. (Note: The Red Rocks Park and Mount Morrison Civilian Conservation Corps Camp on the Lariat Loop Scenic and Historic Byway is a National Historic Landmark. The Morrison-Golden Fossil Areas are a National Natural Landmark.)	
Los Caminos Antiguos Scenic and Historic Byway	129 miles 208 km	Cumbres Pass (Note: Cumbres Pass has an elevation of 10,022 feet (3,055 m).)	Alamosa	2000	This byway traverses the historic San Luis Valley to Great Sand Dunes National Park and Preserve in south-central Colorado; also a Back Country Byway. (Note: The Cumbres and Toltec Scenic Railroad on Los Caminos Antiguos Scenic and Historic Byway is a National Historic Landmark. The Town of San Luis (San Luis de la Culebra) is the oldest town in Colorado. History Colorado operates the Fort Garland Museum.)	
Mount Blue Sky Scenic Byway	49 miles 79 km	I-70 exit 240 in Idaho Springs	SH 74 in Bergen Park	1991	This byway climbs to the 14,271-foot (4,350 m) summit of Mount Blue Sky in central Colorado; also a National Forest Scenic Byway. (Note: The Mount Blue Sky Scenic Byway on Colorado State Highway 5 is the highest paved road in North America with its upper terminus at 14,140 feet (4,310 m) elevation near the summit of Mount Blue Sky at 14,267 feet (4,349 m) elevation. Summit Lake on Mount Blue Sky is a National Natural Landmark. Vehicles over 30 feet (9.1 m) long are not allowed on State Highway 5, but are allowed on State Highway 103 which reaches its highest elevation of 11,020 feet (3,359 m) at Juniper Pass.)	
Pawnee Pioneer Trails Scenic Byway	128 miles 206 km	Ault	Sterling or Fort Morgan	1992	This byway explores the shortgrass prairie region of Pawnee National Grassland in northeastern Colorado.	
Peak to Peak Scenic Byway	55 miles 89 km	Blackhawk (Note: The Central City/Black Hawk Historic District on the Peak to Peak Scenic Byway is a National Historic Landmark.)	Estes Park	1989	This byway crosses the Front Range foothills to Rocky Mountain National Park in north-central Colorado; also a National Forest Scenic Byway.	
San Juan Skyway Scenic and Historic Byway	236 miles 380 km	Loop from Durango to Coal Bank Pass, (Note: Coal Bank Pass has an elevation of 10,640 feet (3,240 m).) Molas Pass, (Note: Molas Pass has an elevation of 10,910 feet (3,330 m).) Silverton, Red Mountain Pass, (Note: Red Mountain Pass has an elevation of 11,018 feet (3,358 m).) Ouray, Ridgway, Dallas Divide, Telluride, Lizard Head Pass, (Note: Lizard Head Pass has an elevation of 10,222 feet (3,116 m).) Rico, Dolores, Canyons of the Ancients NM, Cortez, Mesa Verde NP, Mancos, and back to Durango		1989	This byway loops through the spectacular San Juan Mountains to Canyons of the Ancients National Monument and Mesa Verde National Park in southwestern Colorado; also an All-American Road and National Forest Scenic Byway. (Note: The Durango and Silverton Narrow Gauge Railroad, the Silverton Historic District, and the Telluride Historic District on the San Juan Skyway Scenic and Historic Byway are National Historic Landmarks.)	
Santa Fe Trail Scenic and Historic Byway	188 miles 303 km (Note: The Santa Fe Trail Scenic and Historic Byway has 188 miles (303 km) of Colorado roadway and the Santa Fe Trail Scenic Byway has 381 miles (613 km) of New Mexico roadway.)	Santa Fe, New Mexico	US 50 east of Holly, Colorado	1991	This byway follows the Santa Fe National Historic Trail through southeastern Colorado and northern New Mexico; also a National Scenic Byway. (Note: The Amache National Historic Site, Bent's Old Fort National Historic Site, and Raton Pass on the Santa Fe Trail Scenic and Historic Byway are National Historic Landmarks. History Colorado operates the Trinidad History Museum. Spanish Peaks and Raton Mesa are National Natural Landmarks.)	
Silver Thread Scenic and Historic Byway	117 miles 188 km	US 160 in South Fork	US 50 west of Gunnison	1989	This byway traverses the historic San Juan Mountains of southwestern Colorado; also a National Scenic Byway and National Forest Scenic Byway. (Note: The Silver Thread Scenic and Historic Byway crosses the Continental Divide on Spring Creek Pass at 10,898 feet (3,322 m) elevation, but reaches its highest elevation of 11,530 feet (3,514 m) at Slumgullion Summit. The Slumgullion Earthflow is a National Natural Landmark.)	
South Platte River Trail Scenic and Historic Byway	19 miles 31 km	Loop from Julesburg to Ovid and back to Julesburg		1991	This byway explores the historic Pony Express region of northeastern Colorado.	
Top of the Rockies Scenic Byway	115 miles 185 km	Aspen	I-70 exit 171 near Minturn or I-70 exit 195 at Copper Mountain	1993	This byway explores the highest region of the Rocky Mountains located in central Colorado; also a National Scenic Byway. (Note: The Top of the Rockies National Scenic Byway showcases the two highest peaks of the Rocky Mountains: Mount Elbert at elevation 14,440 feet (4,401.2 m) and Mount Massive at elevation 14,428 feet (4,398 m). The byway crosses the Continental Divide at Independence Pass at 12,095 feet (3,687 m) elevation, Fremont Pass at 11,318 feet (3,450 m) elevation, and Tennessee Pass at 10,424 feet (3,177 m) elevation. The gold mining ghost town of Independence is a historic townsite 2.2 miles (4 km) west of Independence Pass. The Leadville Historic District is a National Historic Landmark. History Colorado operates the Healy House Museum and Dexter Cabin in Leadville. The City of Leadville is the highest incorporated city in North America with a downtown elevation of 10,152 feet (3,094 m).)	
Tracks Across Borders Scenic and Historic Byway	89 miles 143 km (Note: The Tracks Across Borders Scenic and Historic Byway has 89 miles (143 km) of Colorado roadway and the Narrow-Gauge Scenic Byway has 9.9 miles (16 km) of New Mexico roadway.)	Durango, Colorado	Dulce, New Mexico or Chimney Rock National Monument, Colorado	2015	This byway follows a historic narrow-gauge railroad route through the Ute and Apache lands of southwestern Colorado and northern New Mexico.	
Trail of the Ancients Scenic and Historic Byway	116 miles 187 km (Note: The Trail of the Ancients Scenic and Historic Byway has 116 miles (187 km) of Colorado roadway, the Trail of the Ancients National Scenic Byway has 366 miles (589 km) of Utah roadway, the Kayenta-Monument Valley Scenic Road has 26 miles (42 km) of Arizona roadway, the Dine' Tah "Among the People" Scenic Road has 100.3 miles (161 km) of Arizona roadway, and the Trail of the Ancients Scenic Byway has 662.4 miles (1,066 km) of New Mexico roadway.)	Loop from Cortez to Canyons of the Ancients NM, Lowry Pueblo, (Note: Lowry Pueblo in Canyons of the Ancients National Monument is a National Historic Landmark.) Hovenweep NM, Bluff, Goosenecks, Mexican Hat, Monument Valley, Kayenta, Mexican Water, Four Corners Monument, Ute Mountain, Towaoc, Yucca House NM, (Note: Yucca House National Monument is undeveloped.) and back to Cortez (Note: This 282-mile (454 km) Four Corners loop is only a portion of the entire 1,271-mile (2,045 km) Trail of the Ancients Scenic and Historic Byway system.)		1994	This byway loops through the historic Canyons of the Ancients National Monument and the Four Corners region of Colorado, Utah, Arizona, and New Mexico; also a National Scenic Byway.	
Trail Ridge Road/Beaver Meadow Scenic Byway	48 miles 77 km	Grand Lake	Estes Park	1996	This crosses the magnificent Rocky Mountain National Park in north-central Colorado; also an All-American Road. (Note: The Trail Ridge Road/Beaver Meadow National Scenic Byway on U.S. Route 34 is the highest continuous paved highway in North America with its high point at 12,183 feet (3,713 m) elevation near Fall River Pass. The highway crosses the Continental Divide at the much lower Milner Pass at 10,759 feet (3,279 m) elevation. The Beaver Meadows Visitor Center is a National Historic Landmark.)	
Unaweep Tabeguache Scenic Byway	133 miles 214 km	Placerville	Whitewater	1990	This byway explores the Colorado Plateau canyon country of western Colorado.	
West Elk Loop Scenic and Historic Byway	205 miles 330 km	Loop from Carbondale to Redstone, McClure Pass, Paonia, Hotchkiss, Gunnison, Crested Butte, Kebler Pass, (Note: Kebler Pass has an elevation of 10,007 feet (3,050 m).) and back to Carbondale		1991	This byway explores the historic West Elk Mountains of west-central Colorado; also a National Forest Scenic Byway.	

== Gallery ==
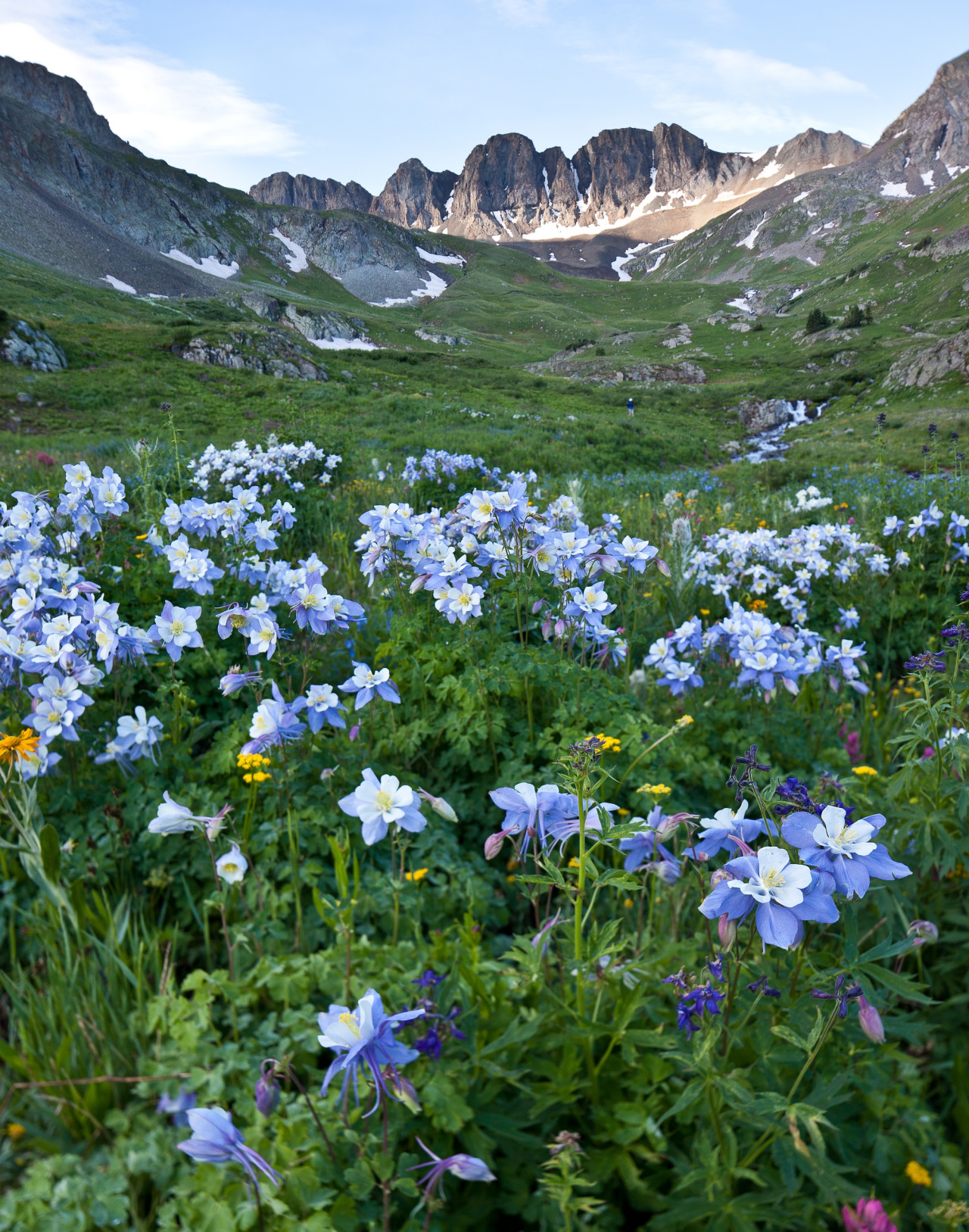
Colorado blue columbine along the Alpine Loop Back Country Byway

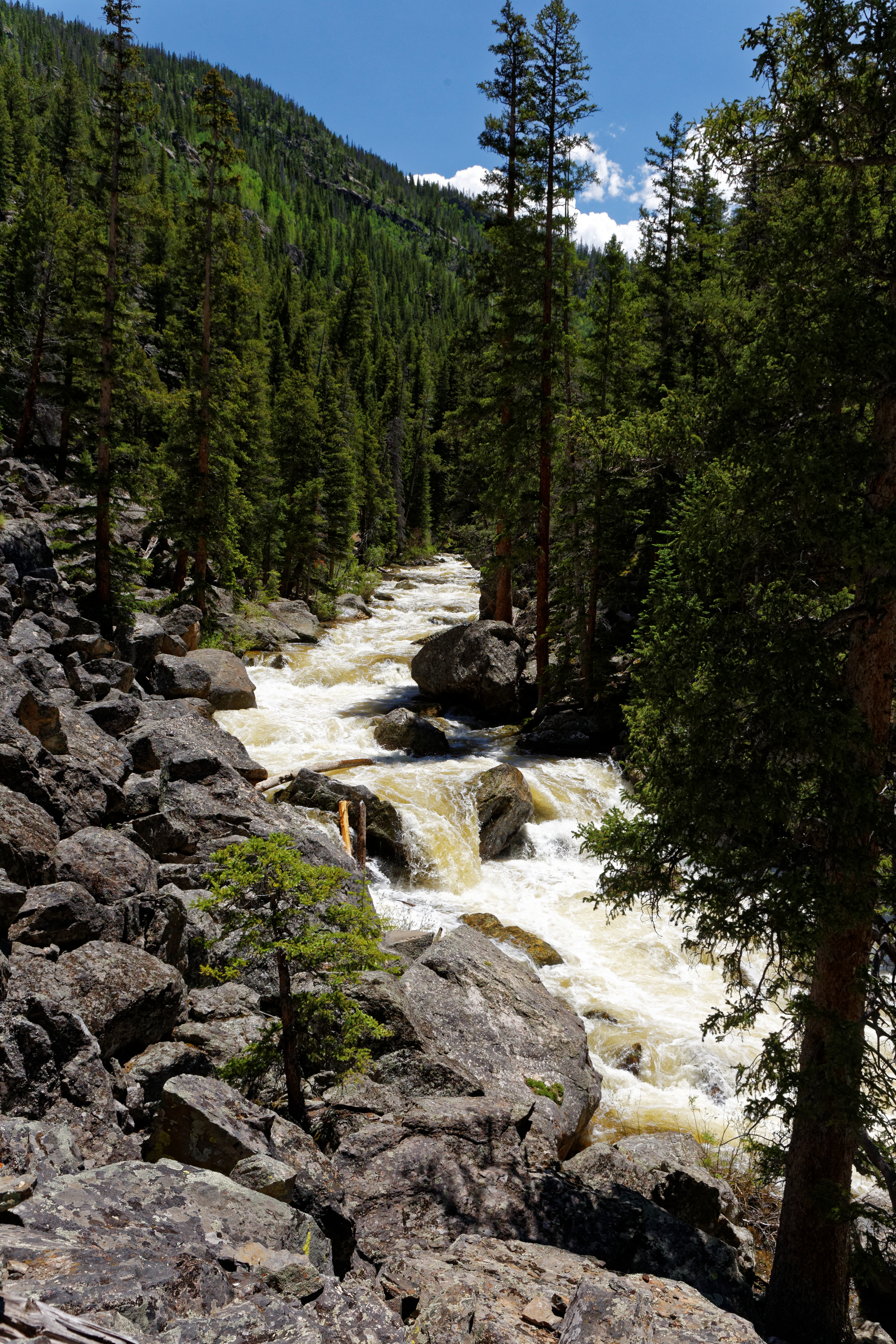
Poudre Canyon on the Cache la Poudre-North Park Scenic Byway

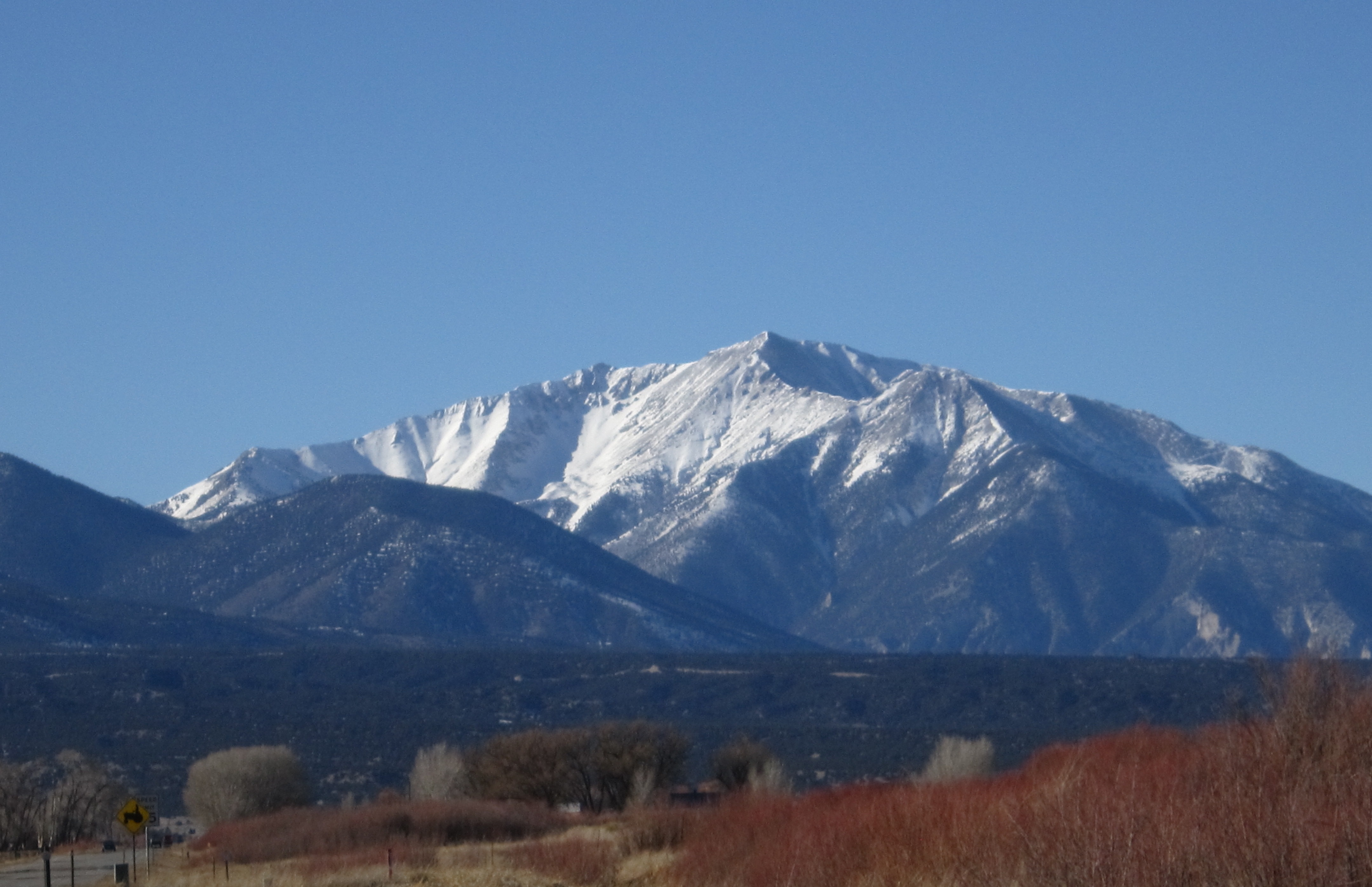
Mount Princeton from the Collegiate Peaks Scenic Byway

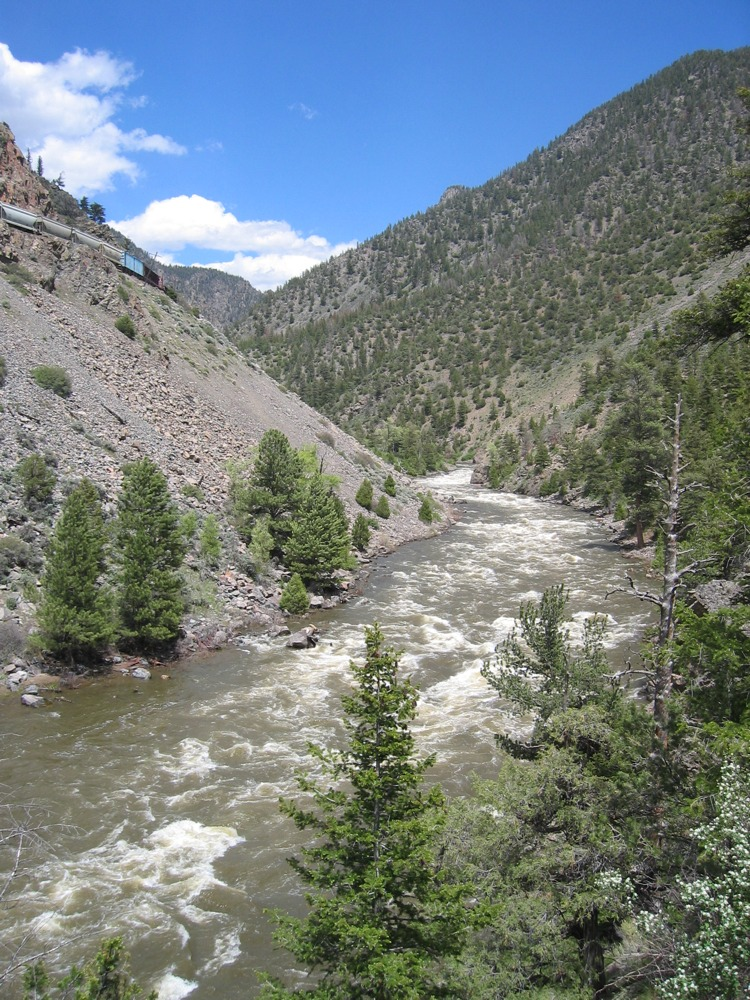
Gore Canyon on the Colorado River Headwaters Scenic Byway

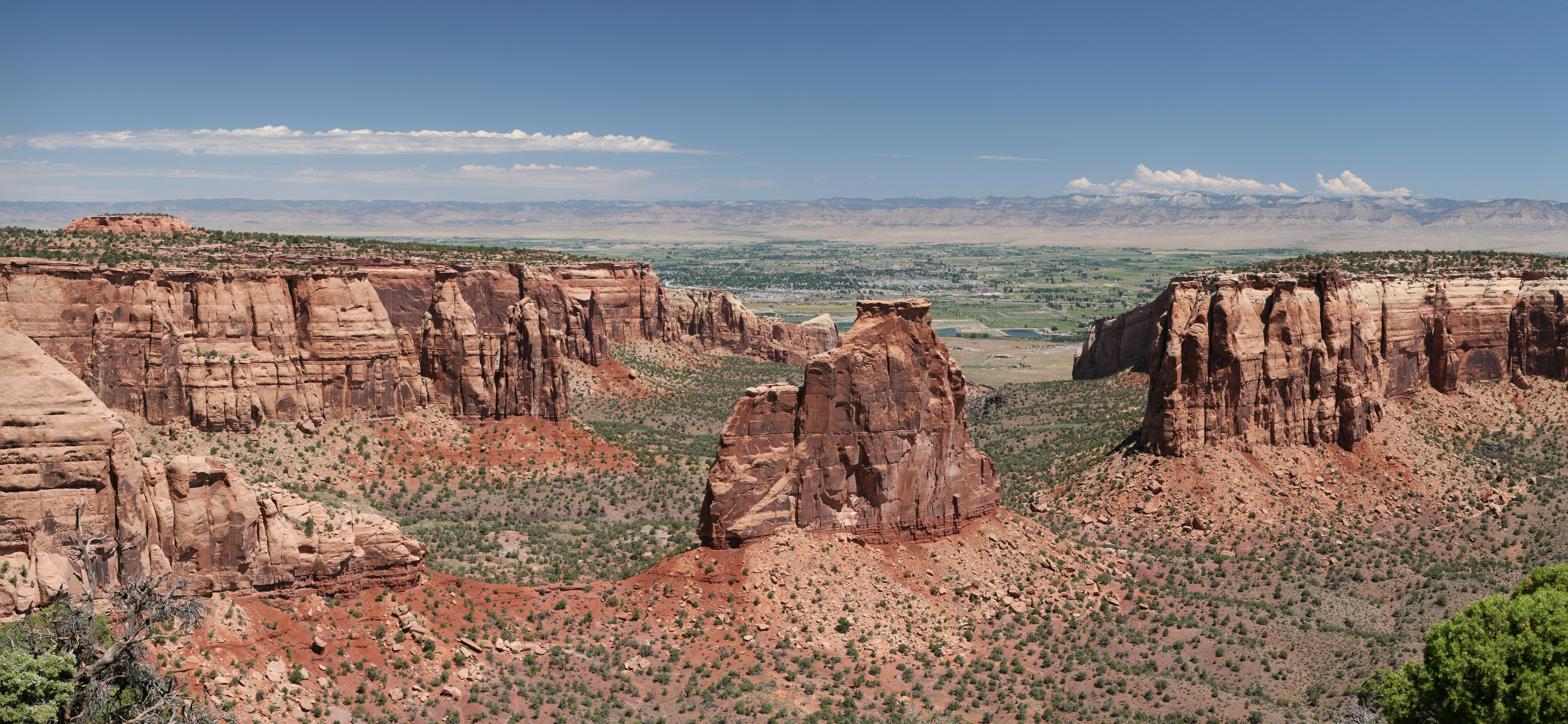
Colorado National Monument along the Dinosaur Diamond Scenic and Historic Byway

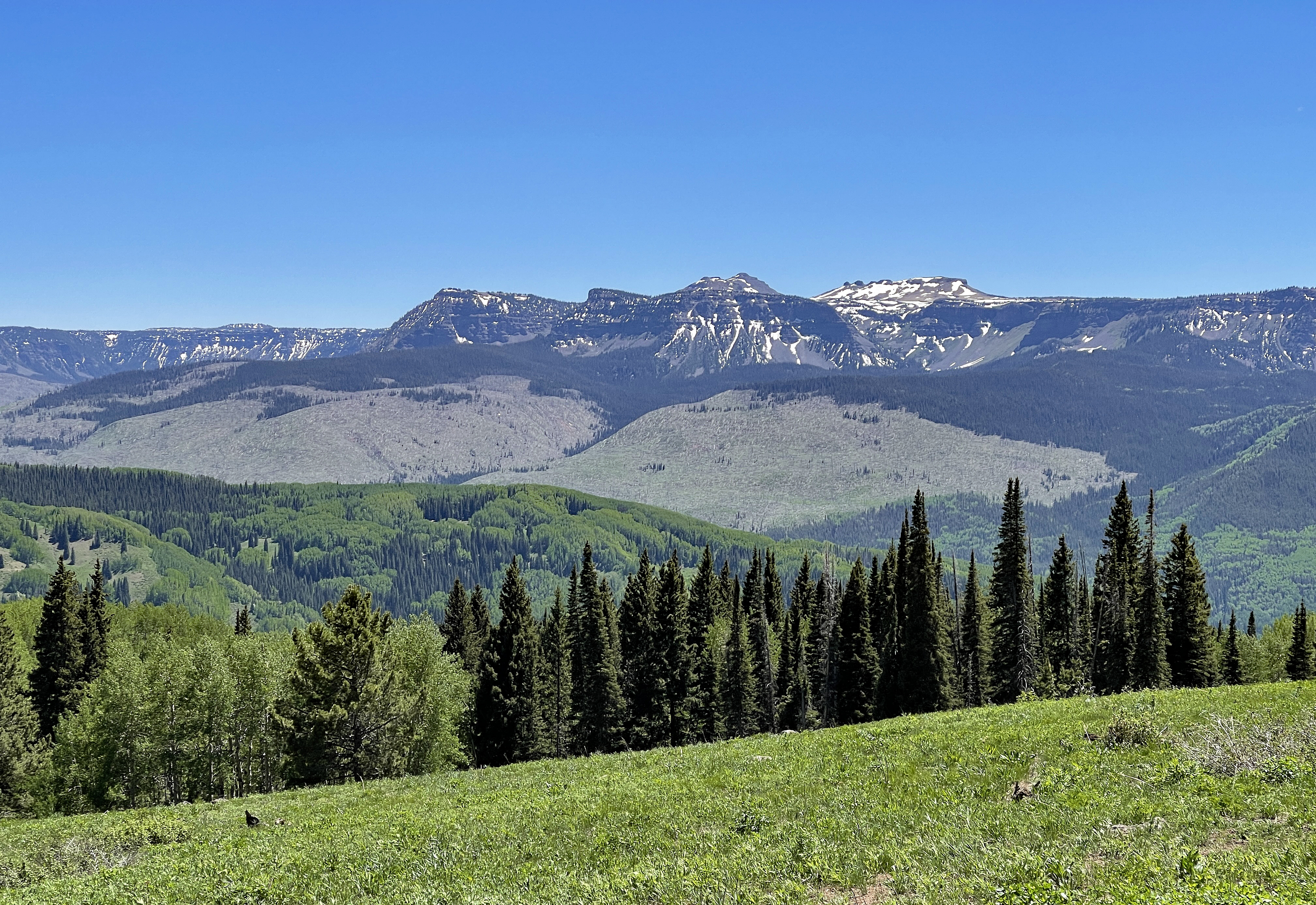
The Flat Tops Wilderness from the Flat Tops Trail Scenic Byway

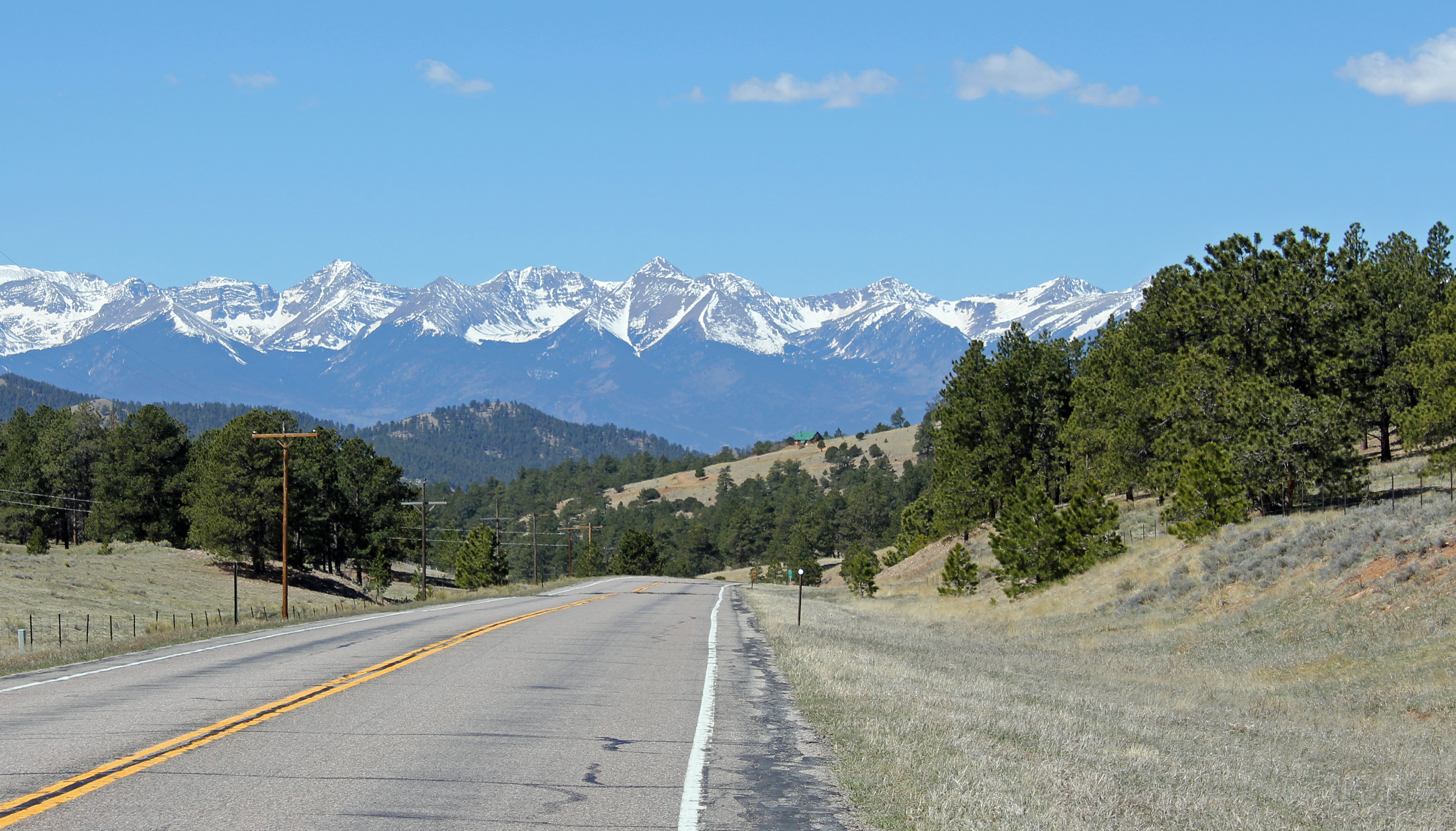
Hardscrabble Pass on the Frontier Pathways Scenic Byway

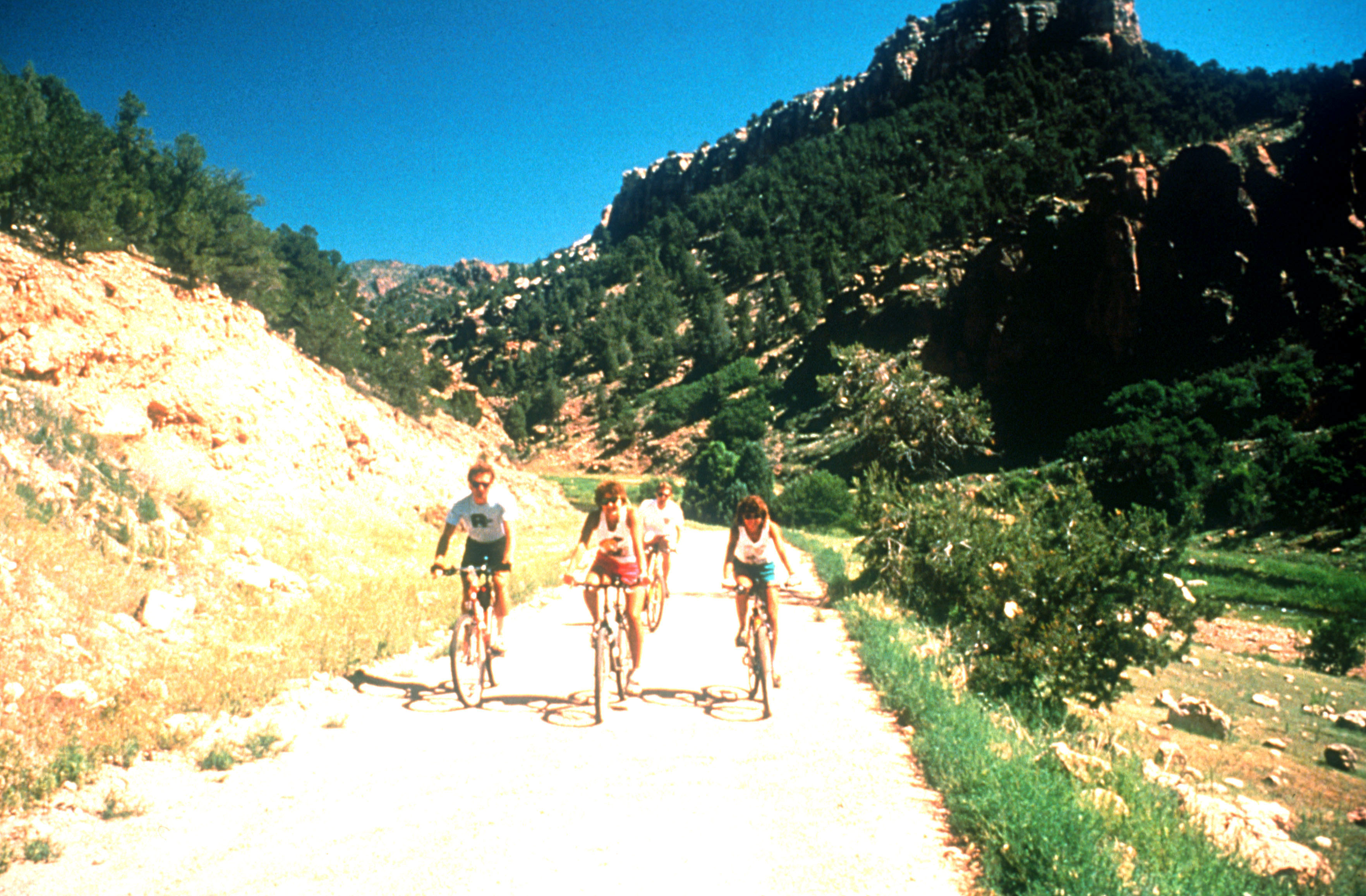
Bicycling on the Gold Belt Tour Scenic and Historic Byway

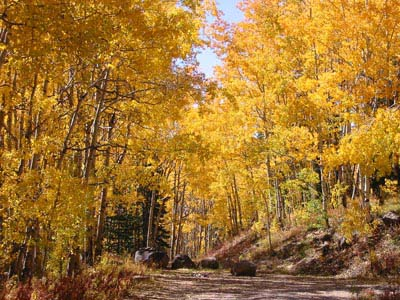
Autumn along the Grand Mesa Scenic Byway

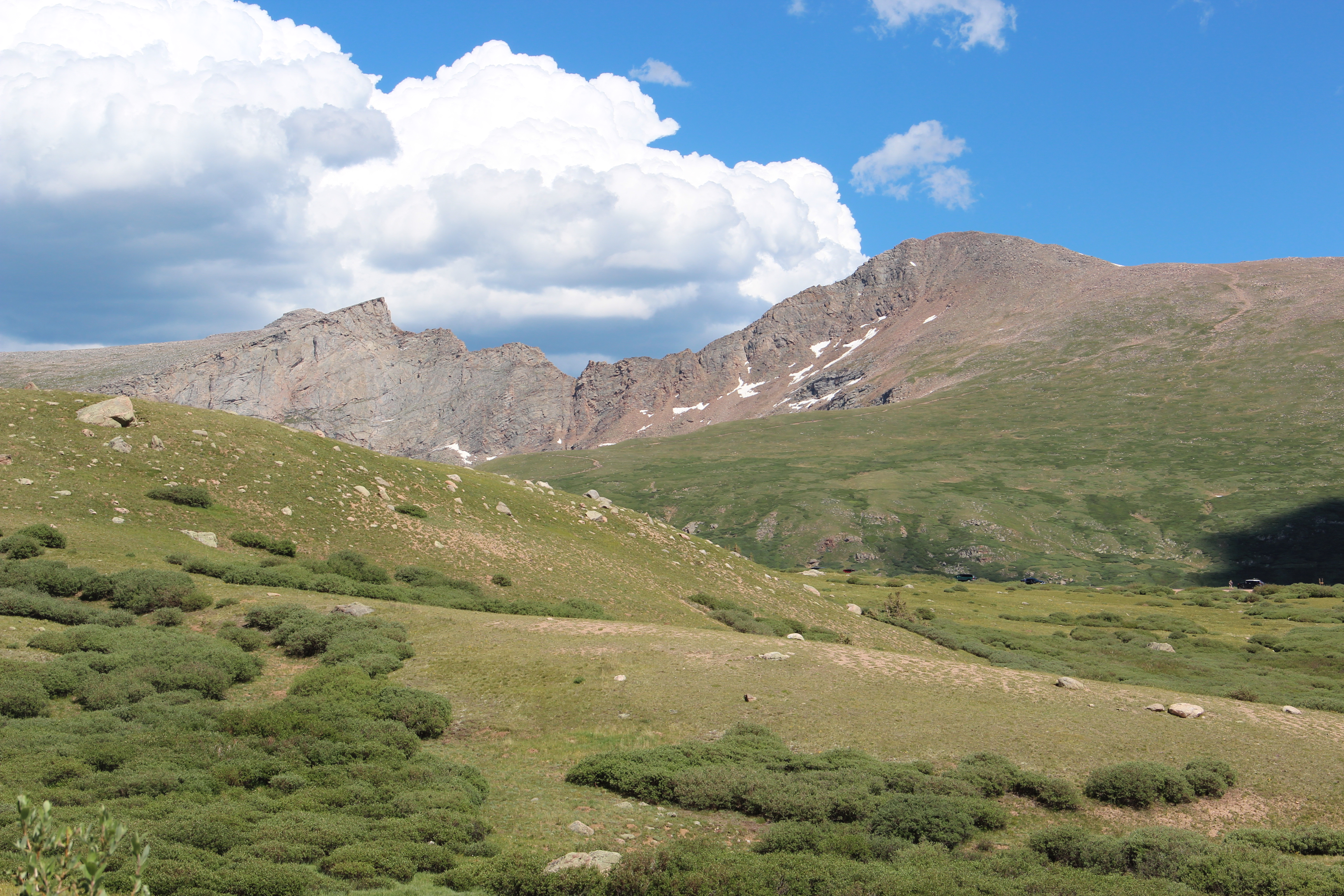
The Sawtooth and Mount Bierstadt from the Guanella Pass Scenic Byway

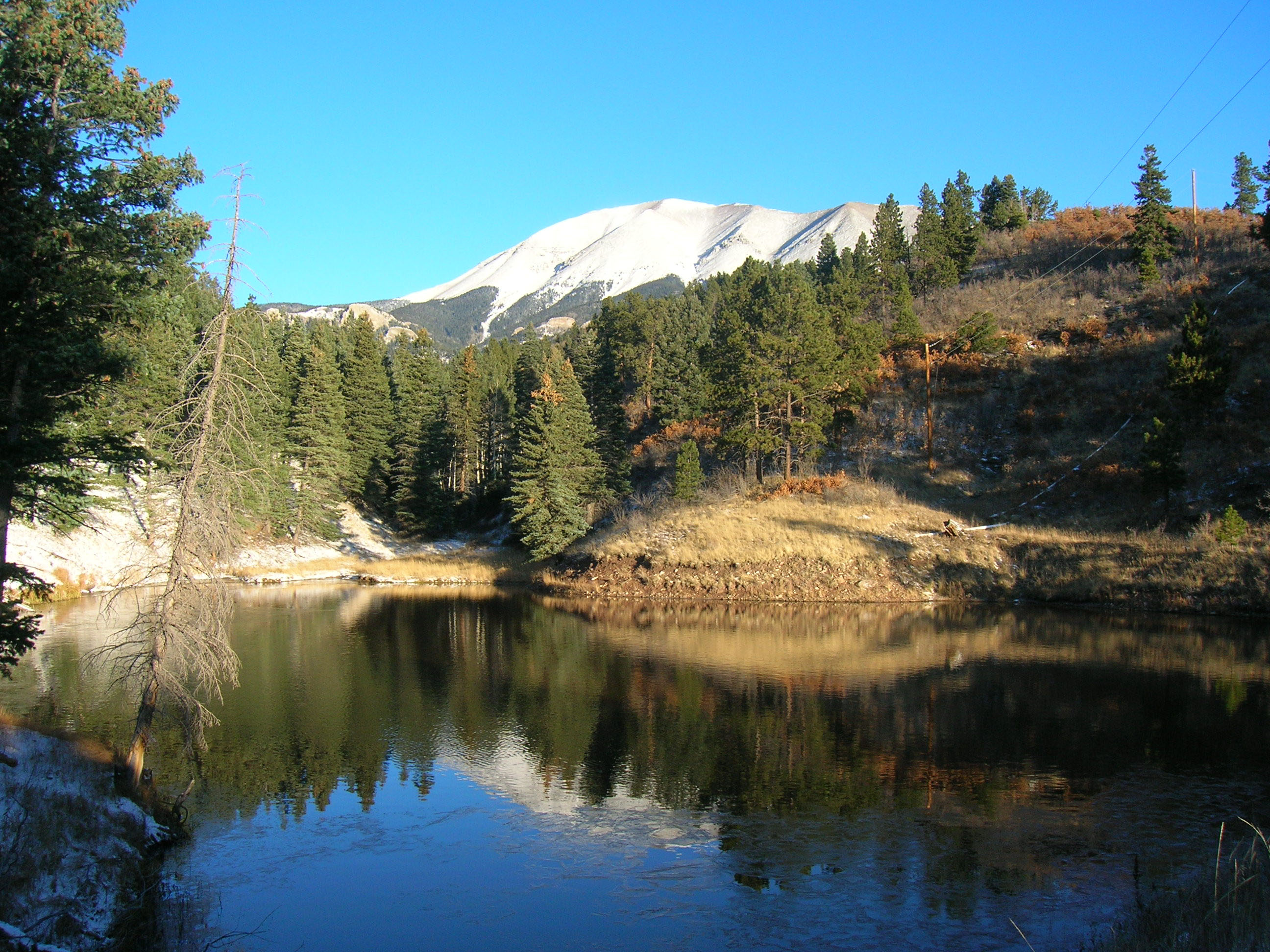
West Spanish Peak from the Highway of Legends Scenic Byway

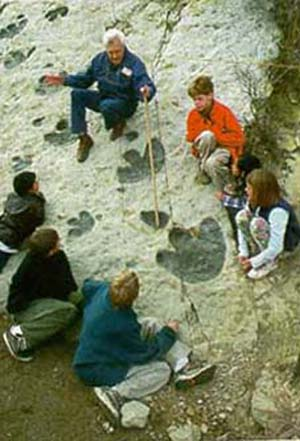
Dinosaur footprints along the Lariat Loop Scenic and Historic Byway

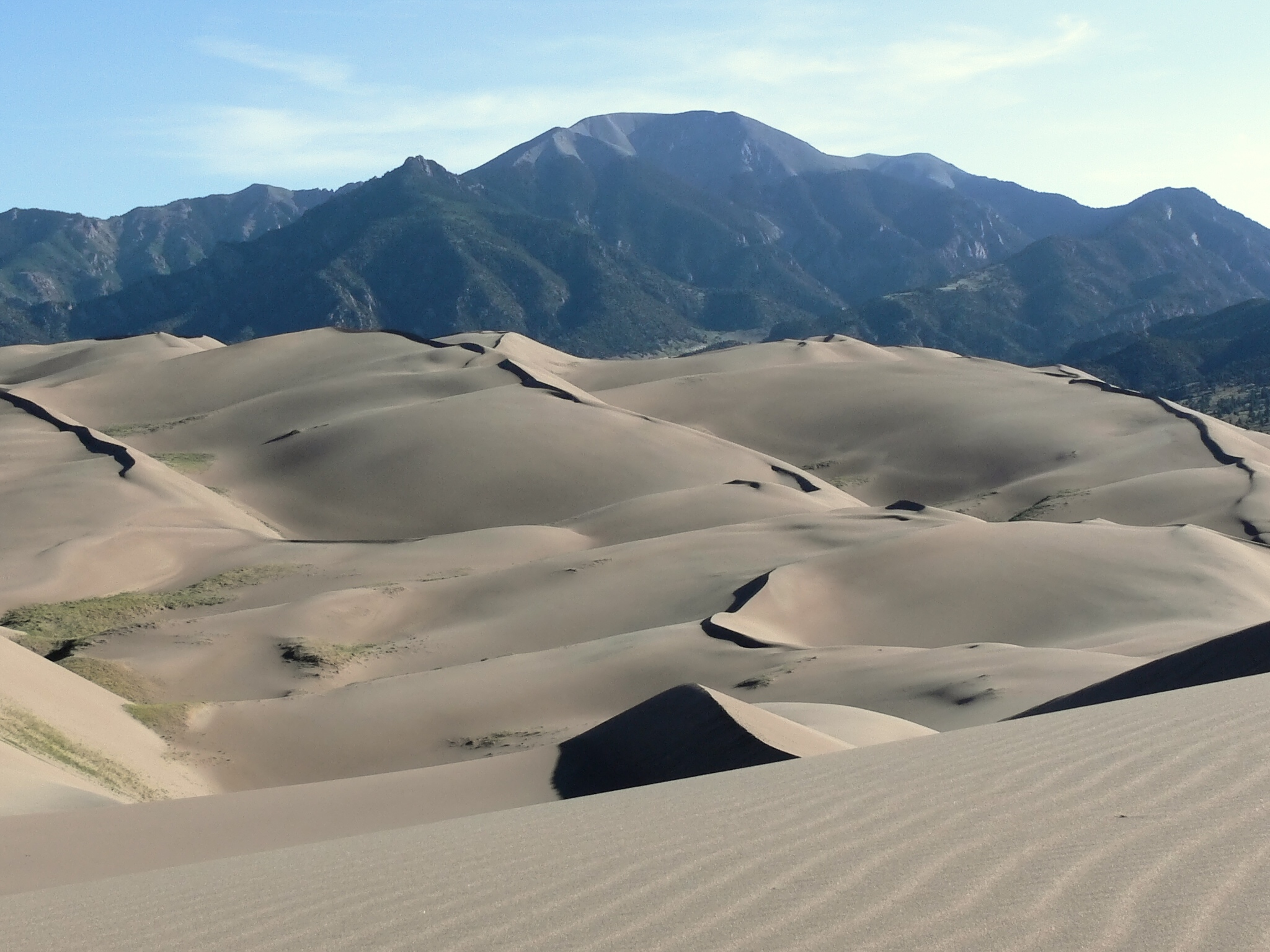
Great Sand Dunes National Park and Preserve along Los Caminos Antiguos Scenic and Historic Byway

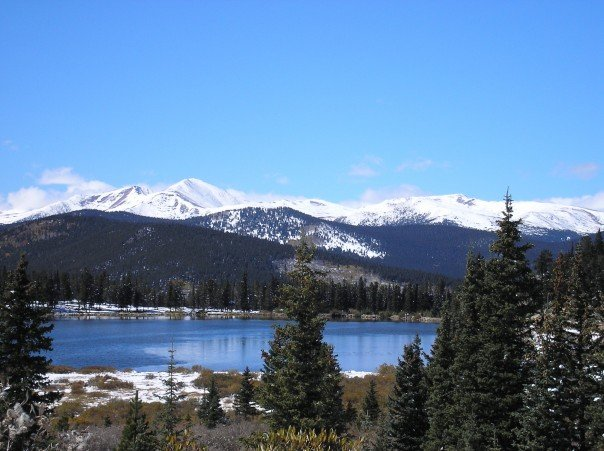
Echo Lake along the Mount Blue Sky Scenic Byway

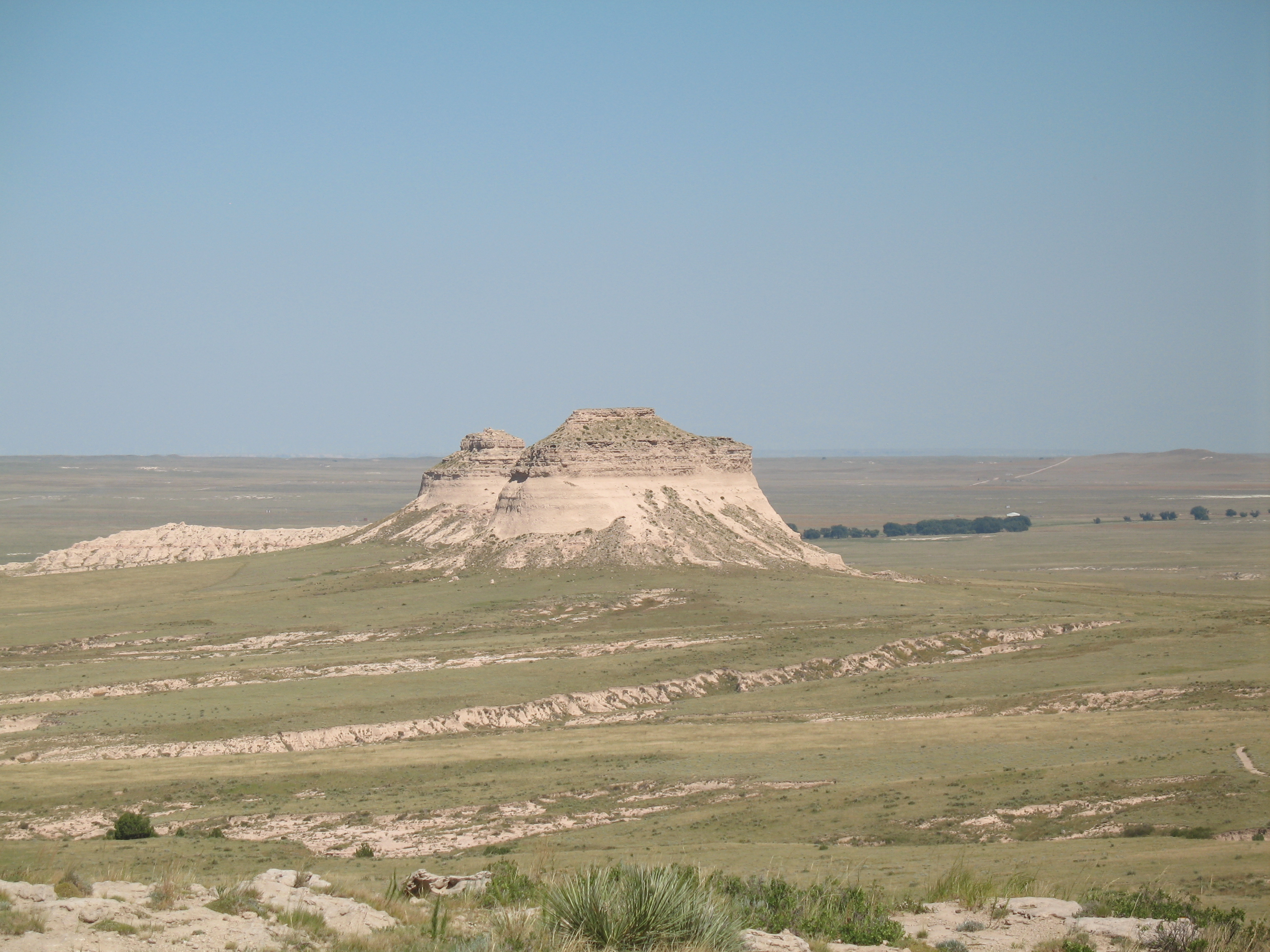
Pawnee Buttes along the Pawnee Pioneer Trails Scenic Byway

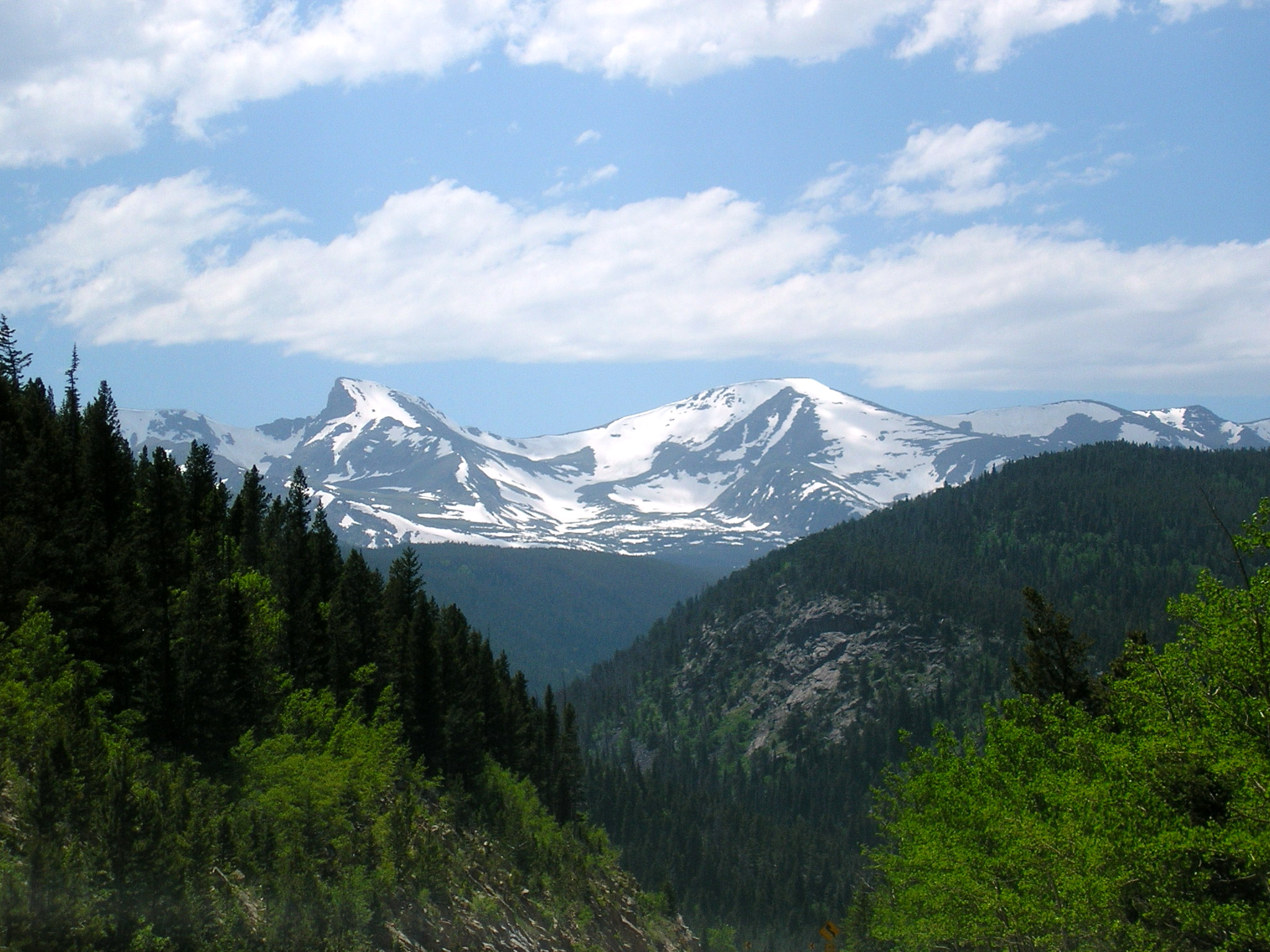
The Indian Peaks Wilderness from the Peak to Peak Scenic Byway

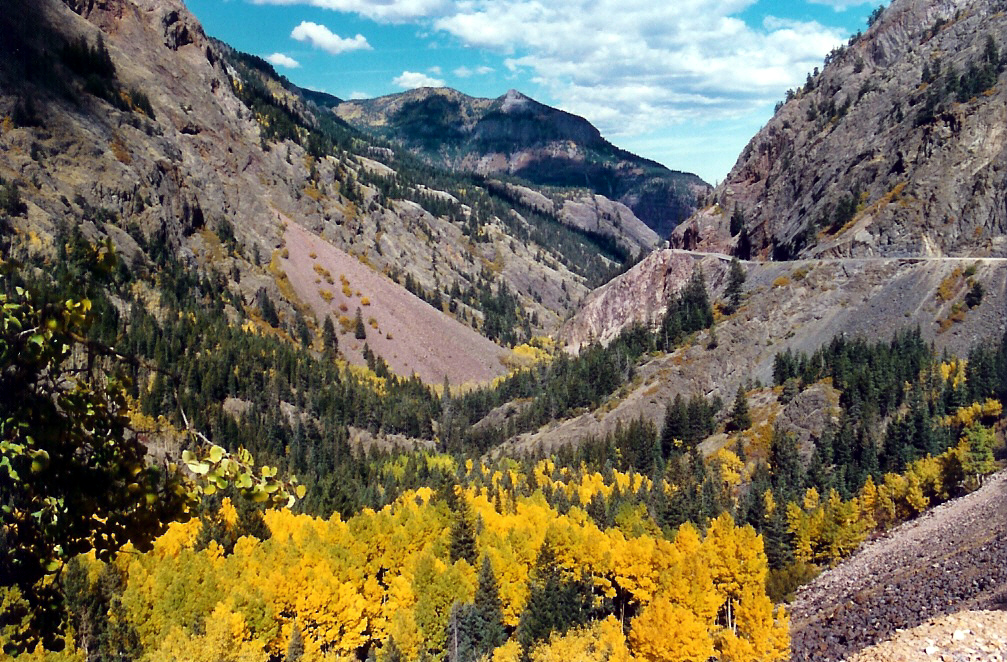
Uncompahgre Gorge along the San Juan Skyway Scenic and Historic Byway

Bent's Old Fort National Historic Site on the Santa Fe Trail Scenic and Historic Byway

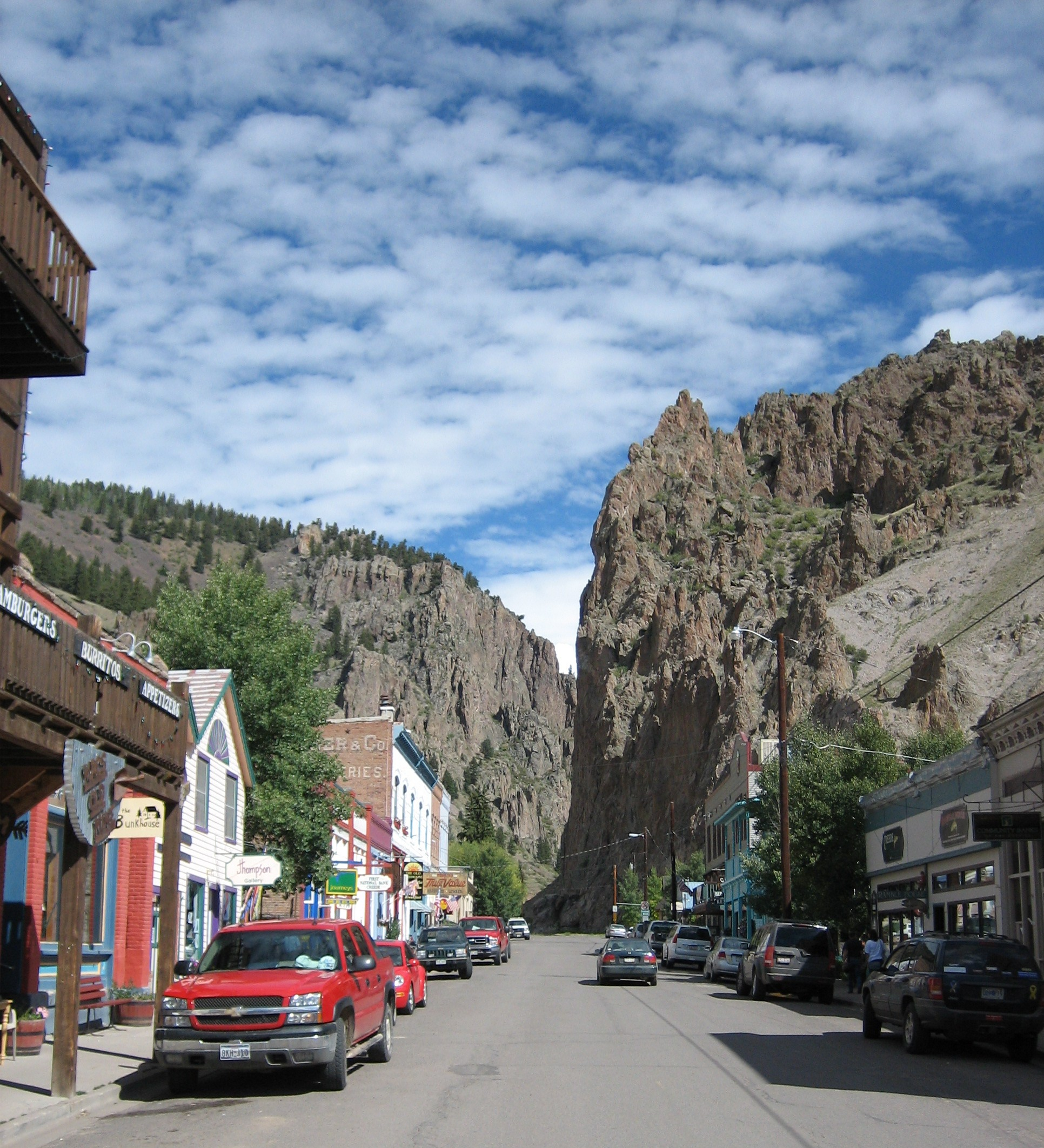
Creede on the Silver Thread Scenic and Historic Byway

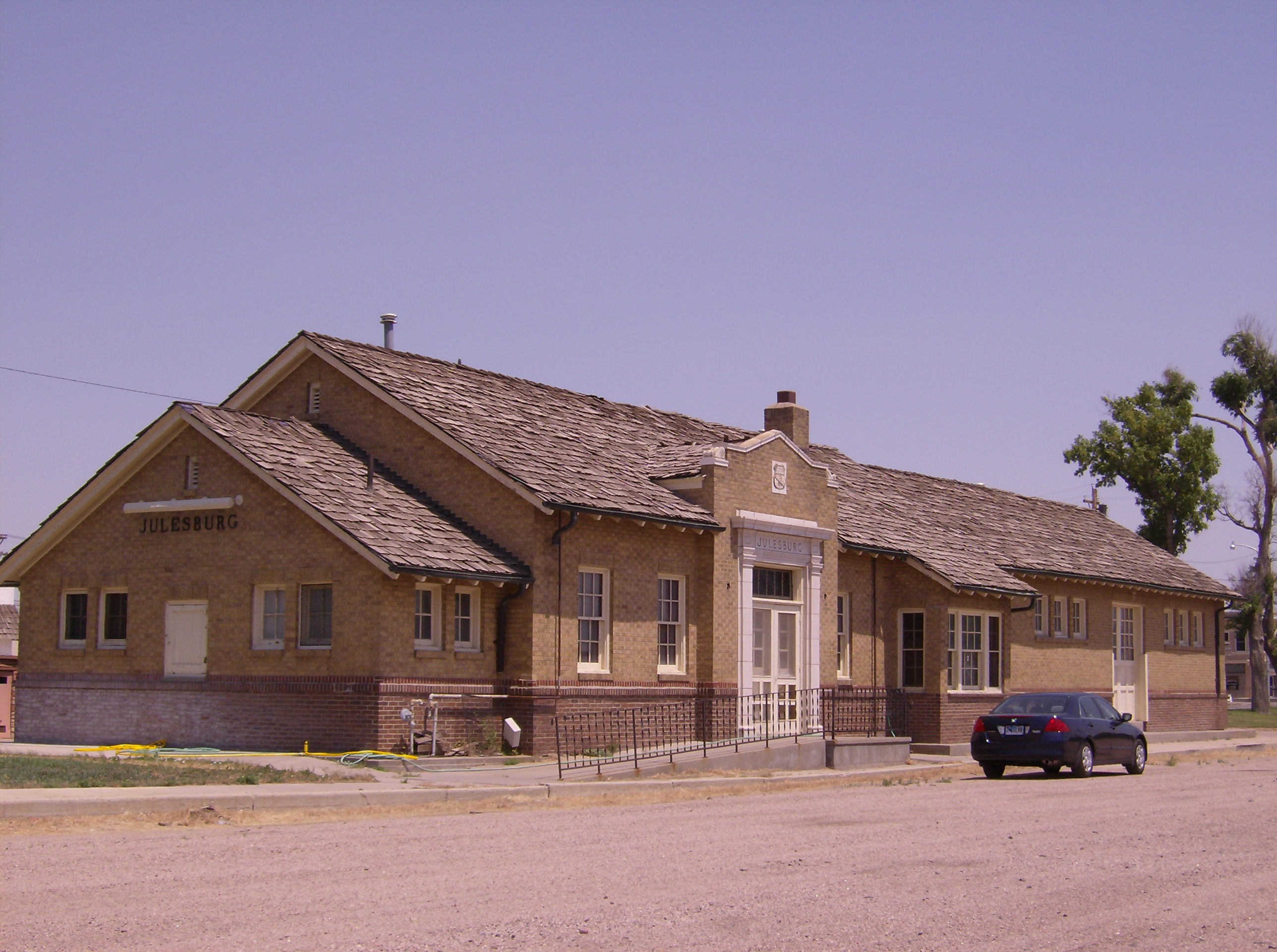
Julesburg Depot on the South Platte River Trail Scenic and Historic Byway

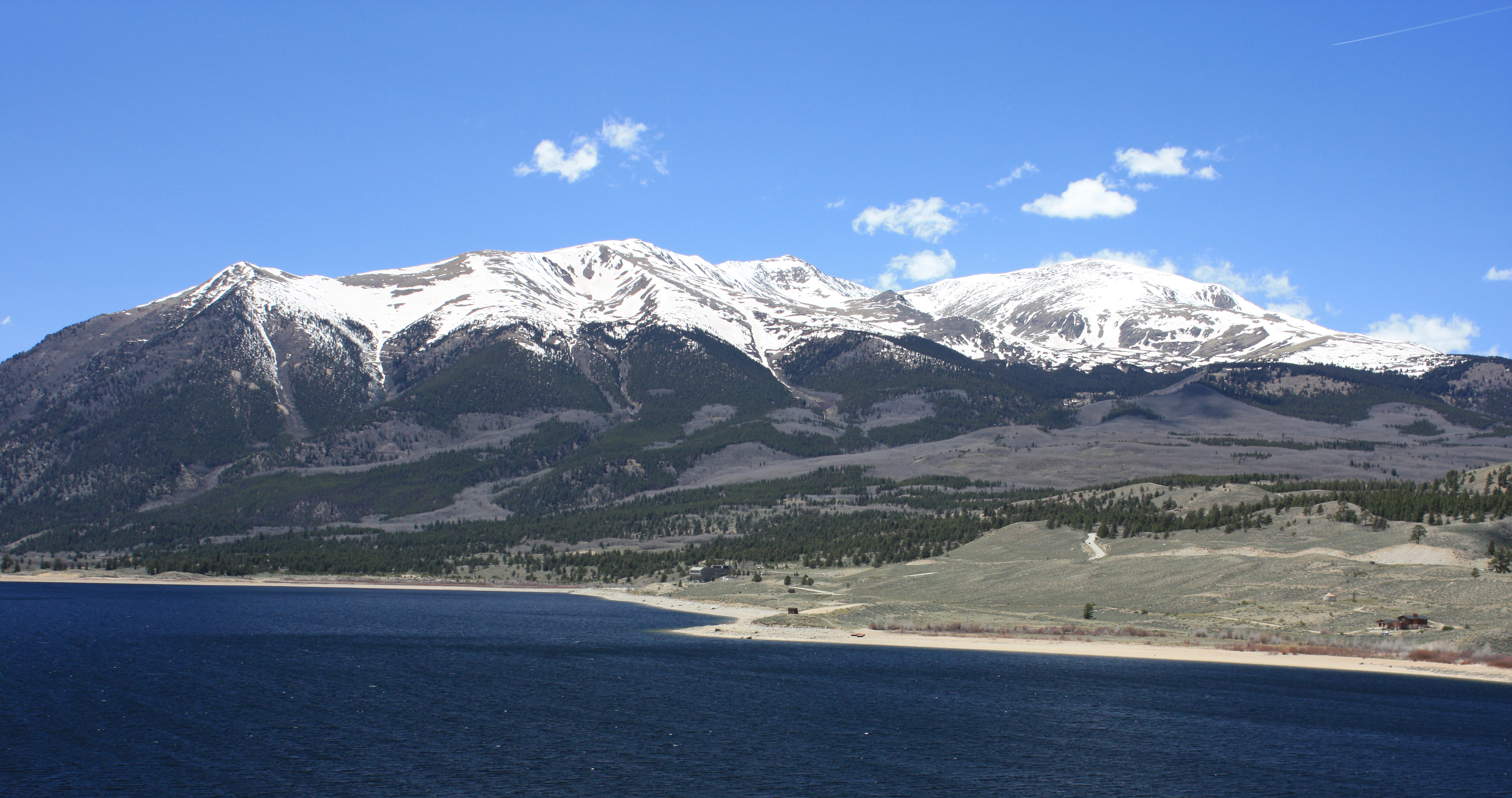
Mount Elbert and Twin Lakes along the Top of the Rockies Scenic Byway

Chimney Rock National Monument on the Tracks Across Borders Scenic and Historic Byway

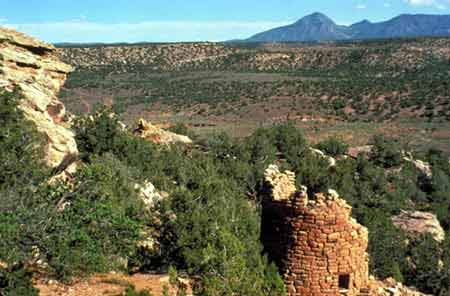
Canyons of the Ancients National Monument on the Trail of the Ancients Scenic and Historic Byway

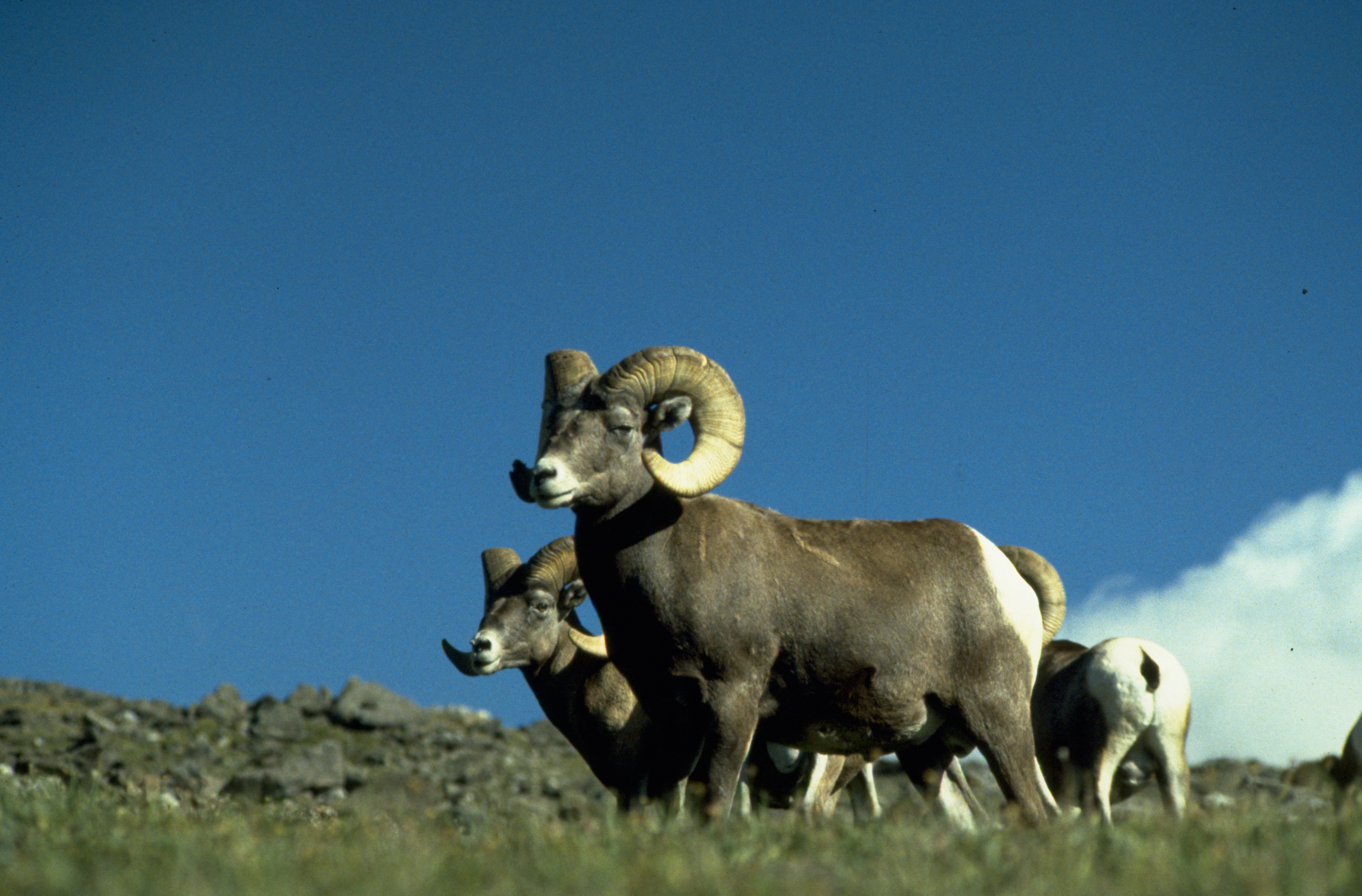
Rocky Mountain bighorn sheep along the Trail Ridge Road/Beaver Meadow Scenic Byway

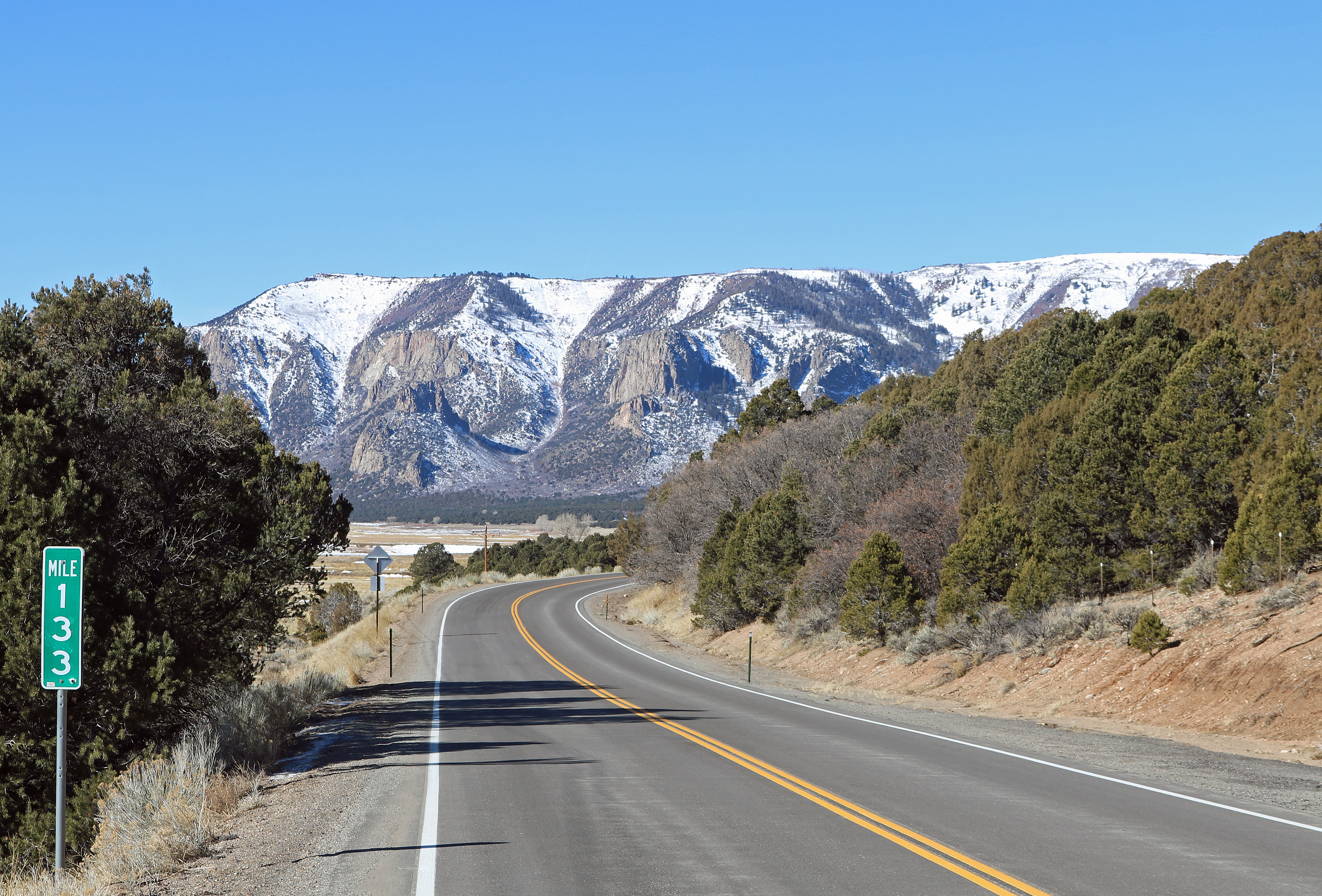
Unaweep Canyon on the Unaweep Tabeguache Scenic Byway

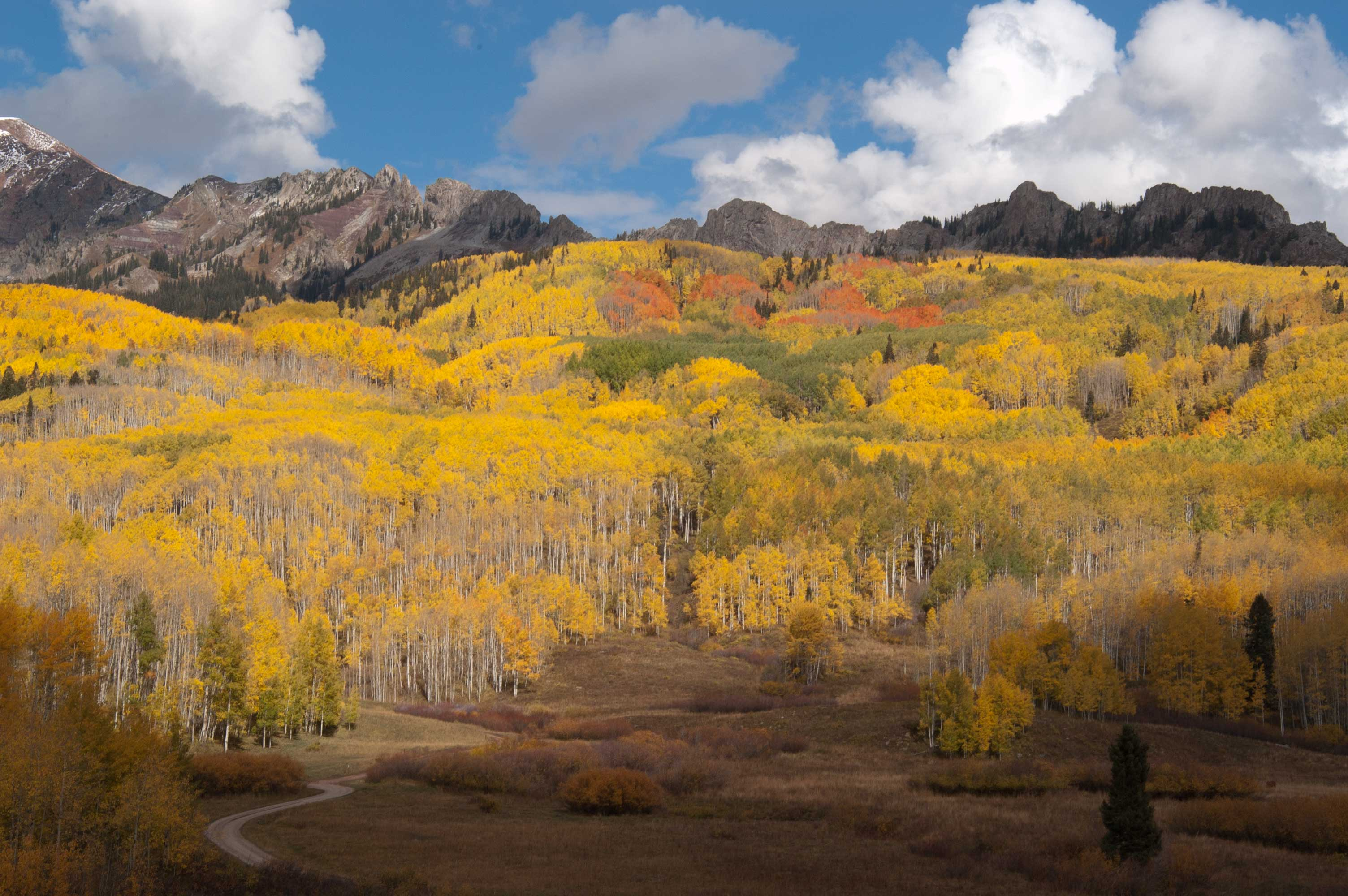
Autumn along the West Elk Loop Scenic and Historic Byway

== See also ==
- Scenic byways in the United States
