= Santa Fe Trail Scenic and Historic Byway =

Colorado Scenic and Historic Byway

Coordinates: 38.0405°N 103.4298°W

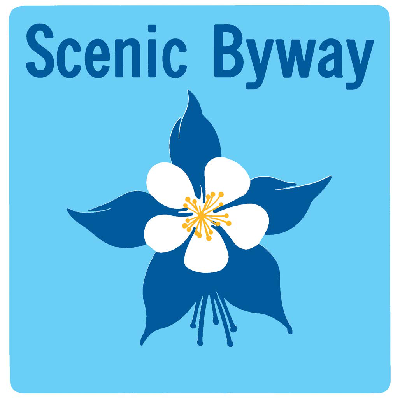
Santa Fe Trail Scenic and Historic Byway

Route information
- Maintained by CDOT
- Length: 188 mi (303 km)

Major junctions
- East end: US 50 4 miles (6 km) east of Holly
- West end: I-25 Raton Pass

Location
- Country: United States
- State: Colorado
- Counties: Prowers, Bent, Otero, and Las Animas counties

Highway system
- Scenic Byways; National; National Forest; BLM; NPS; Colorado State Highway System; Interstate; US; State; Scenic

The Santa Fe Trail Scenic and Historic Byway is a 188-mile (303 km) National Scenic Byway and Colorado Scenic and Historic Byway located in Prowers, Bent, Otero, and Las Animas counties, Colorado, USA. The byway follows the Santa Fe National Historic Trail through southeastern Colorado and connects to the 381-mile (613 km) Santa Fe Trail Scenic Byway in New Mexico at Raton Pass, a National Historic Landmark at elevation 7,834 feet (2,388 m). The byway visits Amache National Historic Site and Bent's Old Fort National Historic Site, both National Historic Landmarks, and winds between the Spanish Peaks and Raton Mesa, both National Natural Landmarks.

The byway connects with the Highway of Legends National Scenic Byway at Trinidad.

== Attractions ==
- Santa Fe National Historic Trail
- National Old Trails Road
- Amache National Historic Site
- John Martin Reservoir State Park
- Fort Lyon
- Boggsville
- Bent's Old Fort National Historic Site
- Koshare Museum and Dancers
- Comanche National Grassland
- Trinidad History Museum
- Trinidad Lake State Park
- Fishers Peak State Park

== See also ==
- History Colorado
