= Pawnee Pioneer Trails Scenic Byway =

Colorado Scenic and Historic Byway

Coordinates: 40.8236°N 103.9690°W

Route information
- Maintained by CDOT
- Length: 128 mi (206 km)
- Existed: 1992–present

Major junctions
- East end: US 6 / SH 14 Sterling or US 6 / SH 52 Fort Morgan
- West end: US 85 / SH 14 Ault

Location
- Country: United States
- State: Colorado
- Counties: Logan, Morgan, and Weld counties

Highway system
- Colorado State Highway System; Interstate; US; State; Scenic

The Pawnee Pioneer Trails Scenic and Historic Byway is a 128-mile (206 km) Colorado Scenic and Historic Byway located in Logan, Morgan, and Weld counties, Colorado, USA. The byway explores the Pawnee Buttes region and Pawnee National Grassland of northeastern Colorado.

== See also ==
- History Colorado
- List of scenic byways in Colorado
- Scenic byways in the United States
