= Trail Ridge Road/Beaver Meadow National Scenic Byway =

Colorado Scenic and Historic Byway

Coordinates: 40.4177°N 105.7467°W

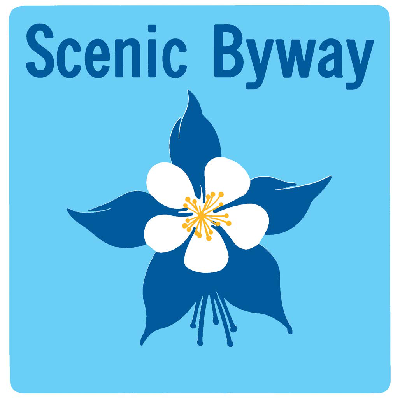
Trail Ridge Road/Beaver Meadow National Scenic Byway

Route information
- Maintained by National Park Service
- Length: 55 mi (89 km)
- Existed: 1989–present

Major junctions
- East end: US 34 / US 36 Estes Park
- West end: US 34 Grand Lake

Location
- Country: United States
- State: Colorado
- Counties: Larimer and Grand counties

Highway system
- Scenic Byways; National; National Forest; BLM; NPS; Colorado State Highway System; Interstate; US; State; Scenic

The Trail Ridge Road/Beaver Meadow National Scenic Byway is a 55-mile (89 km) All-American Road and Colorado Scenic and Historic Byway located in Rocky Mountain National Park in Larimer and Grand counties, Colorado, USA. The byway consists of the 48-mile (77 km) Trail Ridge Road (U.S. Highway 34) and the connecting 6.9-mile (11 km) Beaver Meadow Road (U.S. Highway 36). With a high point at 12,183 feet (3,713 m) elevation, Trail Ridge Road is the highest continuous paved road in North America. The higher portion of Trail Ridge Road is closed from October to May. The Rocky Mountain National Park Administration Building is a National Historic Landmark.

The byway connects with the 55-mile (89 km) Peak to Peak Scenic Byway at Estes Park and the 80-mile (129 km) Colorado River Headwaters National Scenic Byway at Grand Lake.

== See also ==
- History Colorado
