= Colorado River Headwaters National Scenic Byway =

Colorado Scenic and Historic Byway

Coordinates: 40.0728°N 106.1036°W

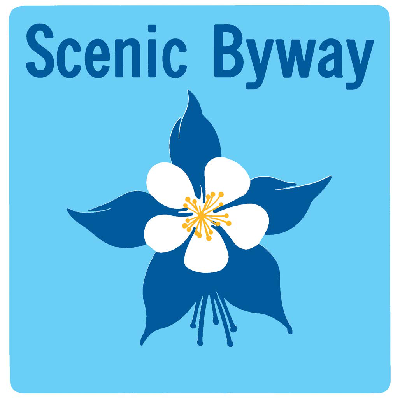
Colorado River Headwaters National Scenic Byway

Route information
- Maintained by CDOT
- Length: 80 mi (130 km)

Major junctions
- East end: US 34 Grand Lake
- West end: SH 131 State Bridge

Location
- Country: United States
- State: Colorado
- Counties: Eagle and Grand counties

Highway system
- Scenic Byways; National; National Forest; BLM; NPS; Colorado State Highway System; Interstate; US; State; Scenic

The Colorado River Headwaters National Scenic Byway is an 80-mile (129 km) National Scenic Byway and Colorado Scenic and Historic Byway located in Eagle and Grand counties, Colorado, US. The byway follows the upper Colorado River from Grand Lake down to State Bridge. The byway connects with the Trail Ridge Road/Beaver Meadow National Scenic Byway at Grand Lake.

== Recognition ==
In 2018 USA Today named it as one of the best waterside drives in the country.

== Gallery ==
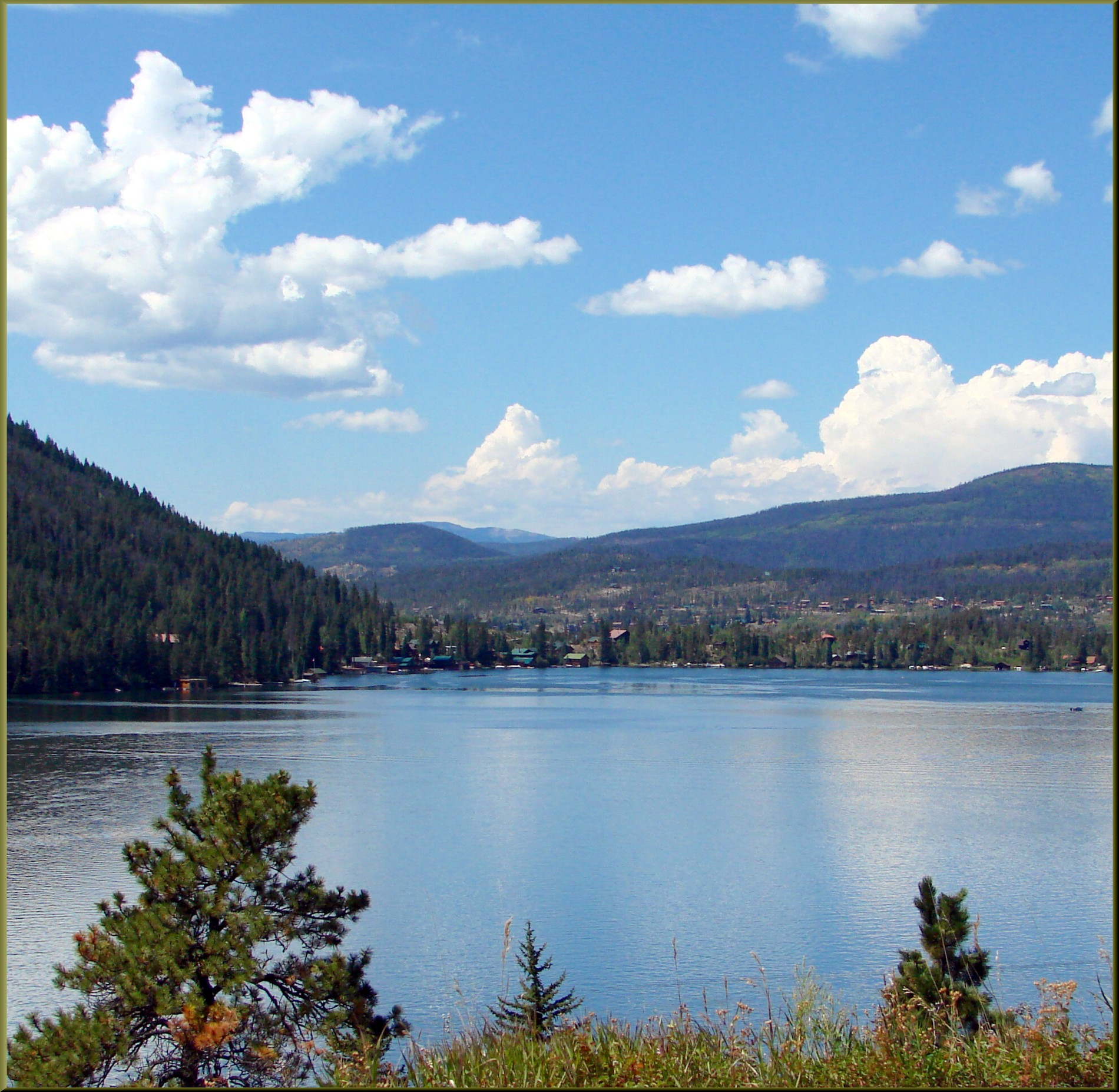
Grand Lake

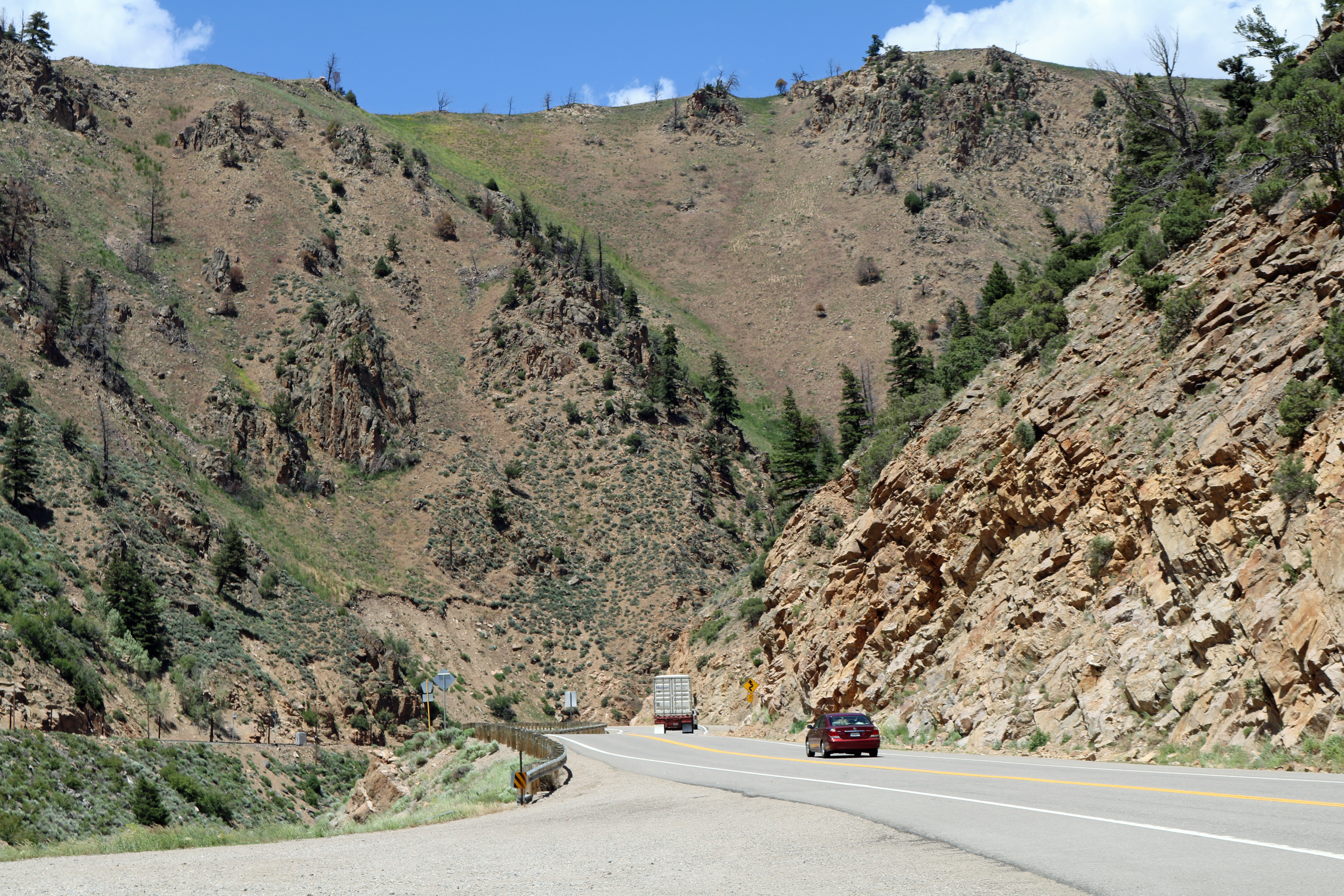
Byers Canyon

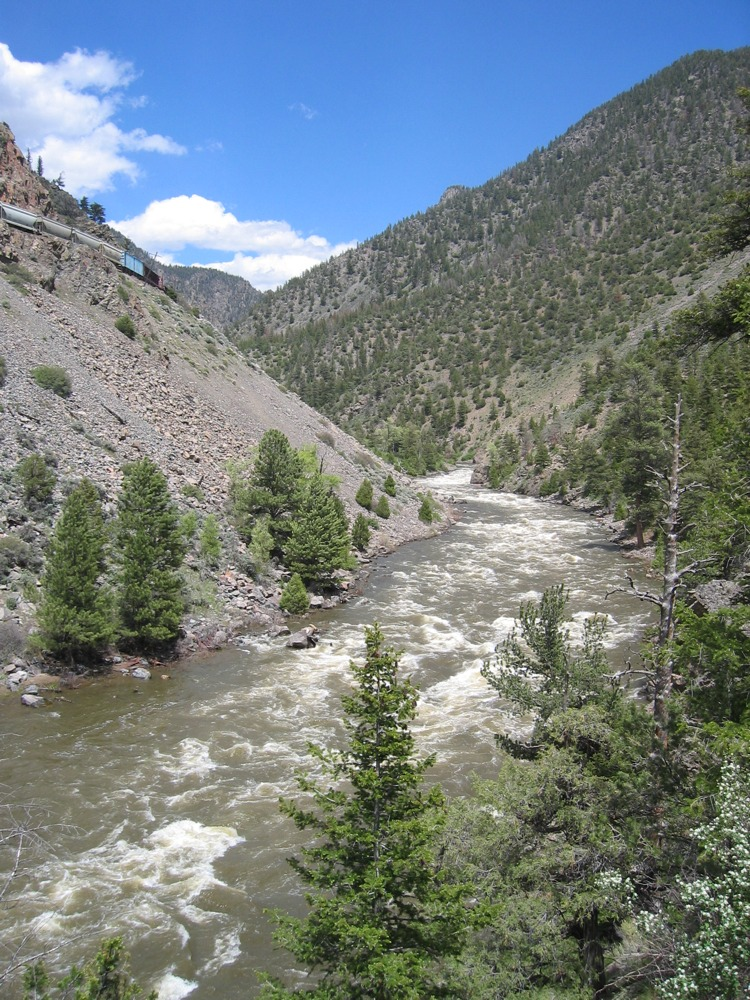
Gore Canyon

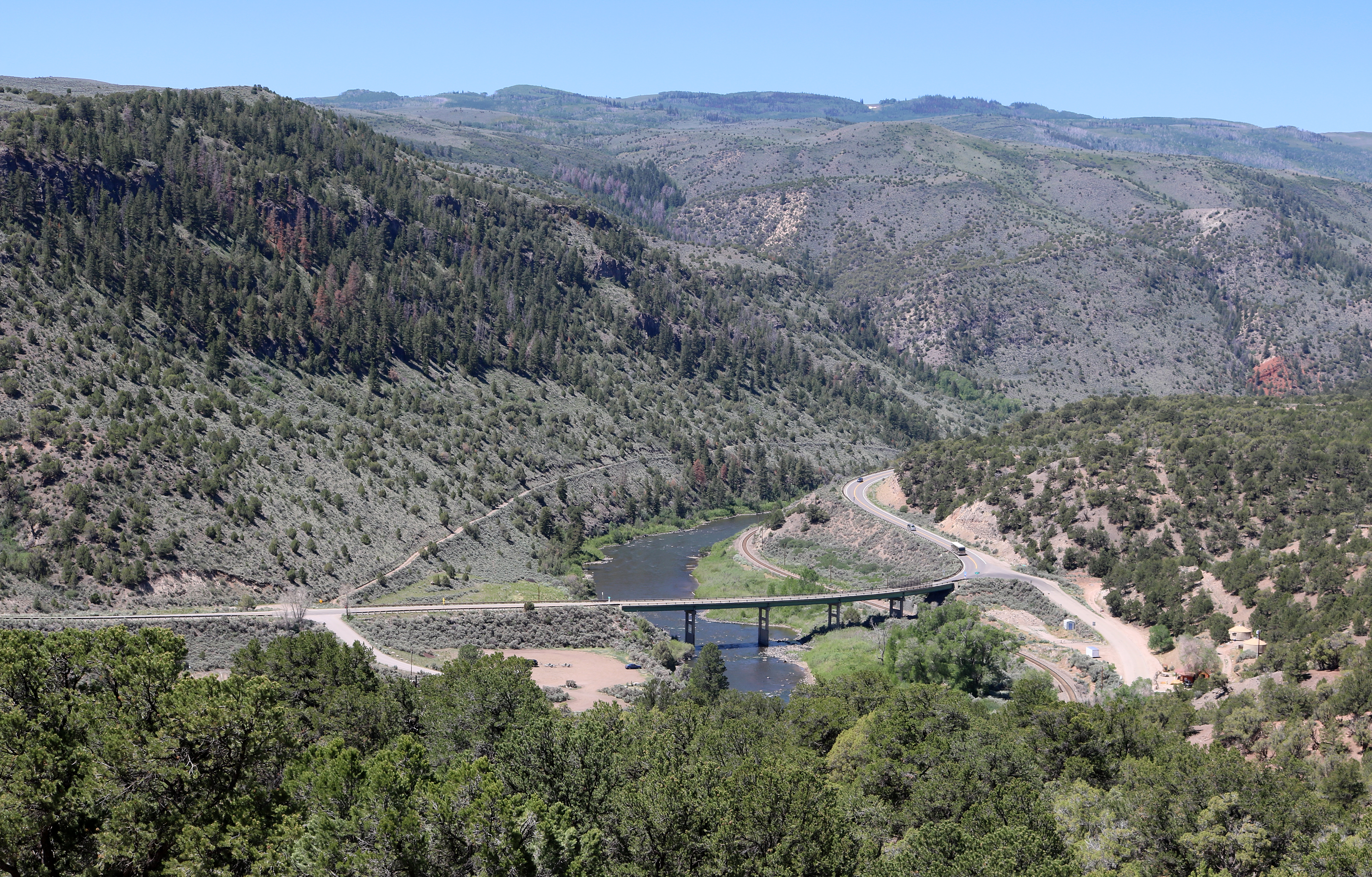
State Bridge, Colorado

== See also ==
- History Colorado
- List of scenic byways in Colorado
- Scenic byways in the United States
