= Tracks Across Borders Scenic and Historic Byway =

Colorado Scenic and Historic Byway

Coordinates: 37.1151°N 107.6332°W

Route information
- Maintained by CDOT
- Length: 89 mi (143 km)
- Existed: 2015–present

Major junctions
- West end: US 160 / US 550 Durango
- East end: New Mexico state line east of Pagosa Junction

Location
- Country: United States
- State: Colorado
- Counties: La Plata and Archuleta counties

Highway system
- Colorado State Highway System; Interstate; US; State; Scenic

The Tracks Across Borders Scenic and Historic Byway is an 89-mile (143 km) Colorado Scenic and Historic Byway located in La Plata and Archuleta counties, Colorado, USA. From Durango, Colorado, the southern terminal of the Durango and Silverton Narrow Gauge Railroad, a National Historic Landmark, the byway follows the roadbed of the historic narrow-gauge Denver and Rio Grande Western Railroad through the Southern Ute Indian Reservation to the New Mexico state line. At the state line, the byway connects with the 9.9-mile (16 km) Narrow-Gauge Scenic Byway which continues on through the Jicarilla Apache Indian Reservation to Dulce, New Mexico. New Mexico plans to continue the byway on to Chama, New Mexico, the southern terminal of the Cumbres and Toltec Scenic Railroad, another National Historic Landmark, reconnecting the historic railway between Antonito, Colorado and Silverton, Colorado.

The byway connects to the San Juan Skyway Scenic and Historic Byway at Durango.

== See also ==
- History Colorado
- List of scenic byways in Colorado
- Scenic byways in the United States
