= Collegiate Peaks Scenic Byway =

Colorado Scenic and Historic Byway

Coordinates: 38.8418°N 106.1326°W

Route information
- Maintained by CDOT
- Length: 57 mi (92 km)
- Existed: 2015–present

Major junctions
- South end: US 50 / SH 291 Salida or US 50 / US 285 Poncha Springs
- North end: US 24 / SH 82 near Granite

Location
- Country: United States
- State: Colorado
- Counties: Chaffee and Lake counties

Highway system
- Colorado State Highway System; Interstate; US; State; Scenic

The Collegiate Peaks Scenic Byway is a 57-mile (92 km) Colorado Scenic and Historic Byway located in Chaffee and Lake counties, Colorado, US. The Byway follows the upper Arkansas River past the Collegiate Peaks, featuring eight of the highest peaks in the Rocky Mountains.

== Mountain Peaks ==
- Mount Shavano 14,231 feet (4,337.7 m)
- Mount Antero 14,276 feet (4,351.4 m)
- Mount Princeton 14,204 feet (4,329.3 m)
- Mount Yale 14,200 feet (4,328.2 m)
- Mount Harvard 14,421 feet (4,395.6 m)
- Mount Belford 14,203 feet (4,329.1 m)
- Mount Oxford 14,160 feet (4,315.9 m)
- Mount Elbert 14,440 feet (4,401.2 m)

== See also ==
- History Colorado
- List of scenic byways in Colorado
- Scenic byways in the United States
