= Unaweep Canyon =

Unaweep Divide
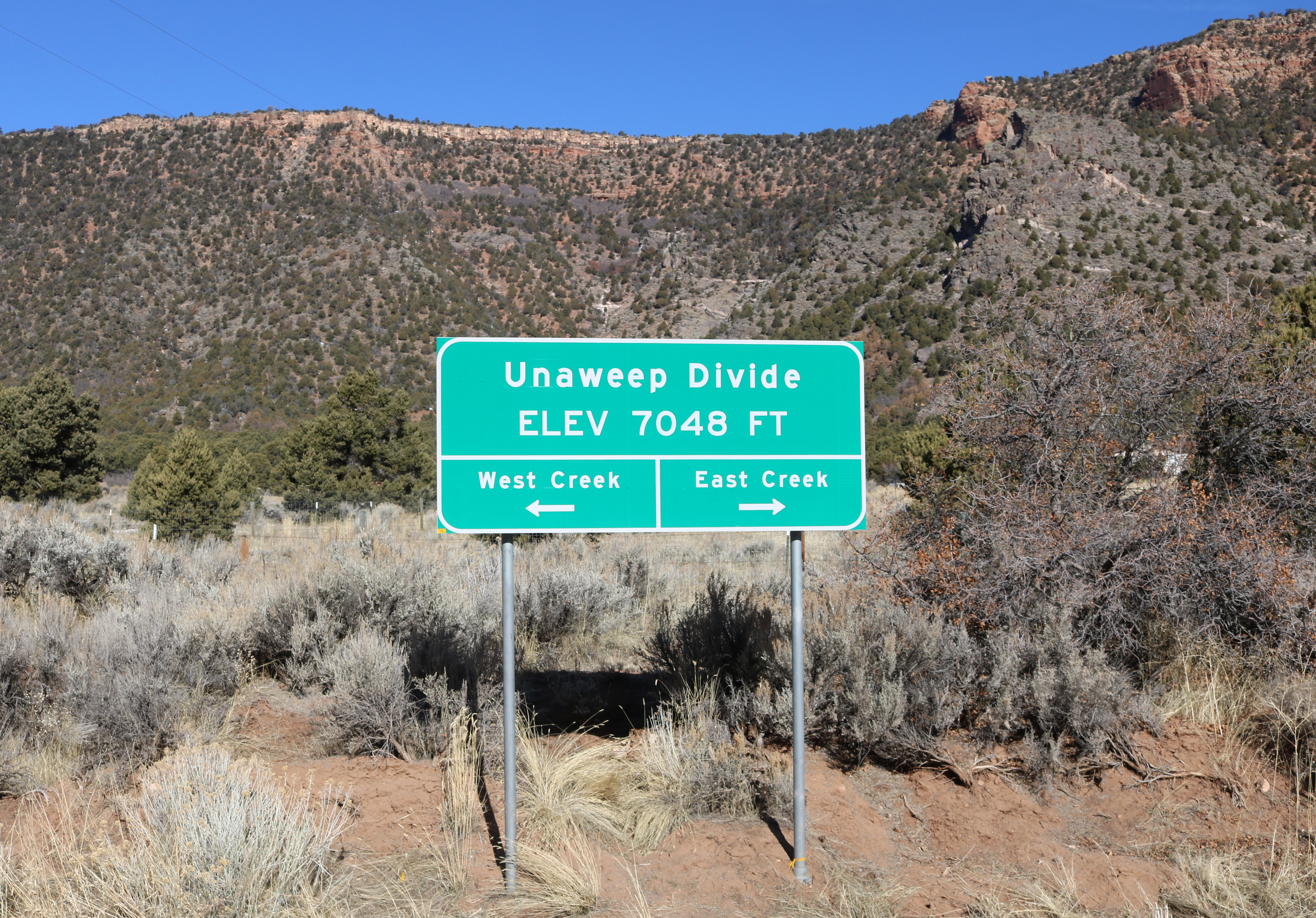
- Unaweep Divide in Unaweep Canyon

- Location within Colorado
- Elevation: 7,008 feet (2,136 m)
- Traversed by: SH 141

Third Approach
- Location: Unaweep Canyon, Mesa County, Colorado
- Coordinates: 38°47′26″N 108°39′18″W
- Topo map: USGS Snyder Flats

Unaweep Canyon is a geologically unique canyon that cuts across the Uncompahgre Plateau, Mesa County, in western Colorado. It is unique because two creeks, East Creek and West Creek, flow out of opposite ends of the canyon, separated by the almost imperceptible Unaweep Divide. State Highway 141 runs inside Unaweep Canyon between Whitewater and Gateway, one segment of the Colorado-designated Unaweep Tabeguache Scenic Byway. The Unaweep Divide, elevation 7,048 ft (2,148 m), is near mile marker 135 on SH 141.

== Hypotheses of origin ==
There are multiple explanations for the origin of Unaweep Canyon. In the late 19th century, members of the Hayden Survey recognized the oddity of a canyon with two outlets, and suggested it was carved by the ancestral Colorado or Gunnison river. Many others have also suggested it was carved by either the Gunnison or Colorado Rivers, but evidence for gravel deposits characteristic of these rivers was elusive, and the existence of the divide remains difficult to explain. Several have suggested that Plio-Pleistocene uplift caused diversion of the (Colorado and/or Gunnison) river(s) and abandonment of the canyon. But rates of river incision typically exceed those of tectonic uplift, making this unlikely. The many apparent glacial-like features of the canyon's inner gorge have led some to suggest a Pleistocene glacial origin for the canyon, but the low elevation of the canyon, and lack of Pleistocene glacial deposits, make this problematic.

=== Recent finds ===
More recently, documentation of gravels characteristic of the Gunnison River and located at the western mouth of Unaweep Canyon provide evidence for occupation of the canyon by an ancestral Gunnison River Hence, the ancestral Gunnison River may have carved the canyon. However, another hypothesis holds that the ancestral Gunnison River did not carve the canyon, but exhumed a pre-existing paleocanyon. This hypothesis of an ancient age for the inner gorge of Unaweep Canyon comes from dating of sediments recovered in a core through the canyon fill. This core proved the existence of a thick (>300 m (980 ft)) sediment fill in the canyon, an idea first proposed in the 1970s on the basis of a geophysical study. Related to the proposed ancient age for the canyon is the hypothesis that the canyon was glaciated during the Late Paleozoic, roughly 300 million years ago. The hypotheses of a Paleozoic age and glacial origin for the canyon, remain debated, like many other hypotheses for the origin of this scenic canyon.
