= Highway of Legends National Scenic Byway =

Colorado Scenic and Historic Byway

Coordinates: 37.3792°N 105.1003°W

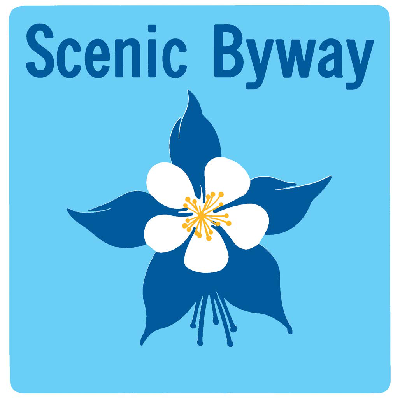
Highway of Legends National Scenic Byway

Route information
- Maintained by CDOT
- Length: 82 mi (132 km)
- Existed: 2021–present

Major junctions
- South end: SH 12 / I-25 Exit 14 Trinidad
- North end: US 160 Walsenburg

Location
- Country: United States
- State: Colorado
- Counties: Huerfano and Las Animas counties

Highway system
- Scenic Byways; National; National Forest; BLM; NPS; Colorado State Highway System; Interstate; US; State; Scenic

The Highway of Legends National Scenic Byway is an 82-mile (132 km) National Scenic Byway, National Forest Scenic Byway, and Colorado Scenic and Historic Byway located in Huerfano and Las Animas counties, Colorado, USA. The byway explores the Spanish Peaks region of San Isabel National Forest, a National Natural Landmark.

== Gallery ==
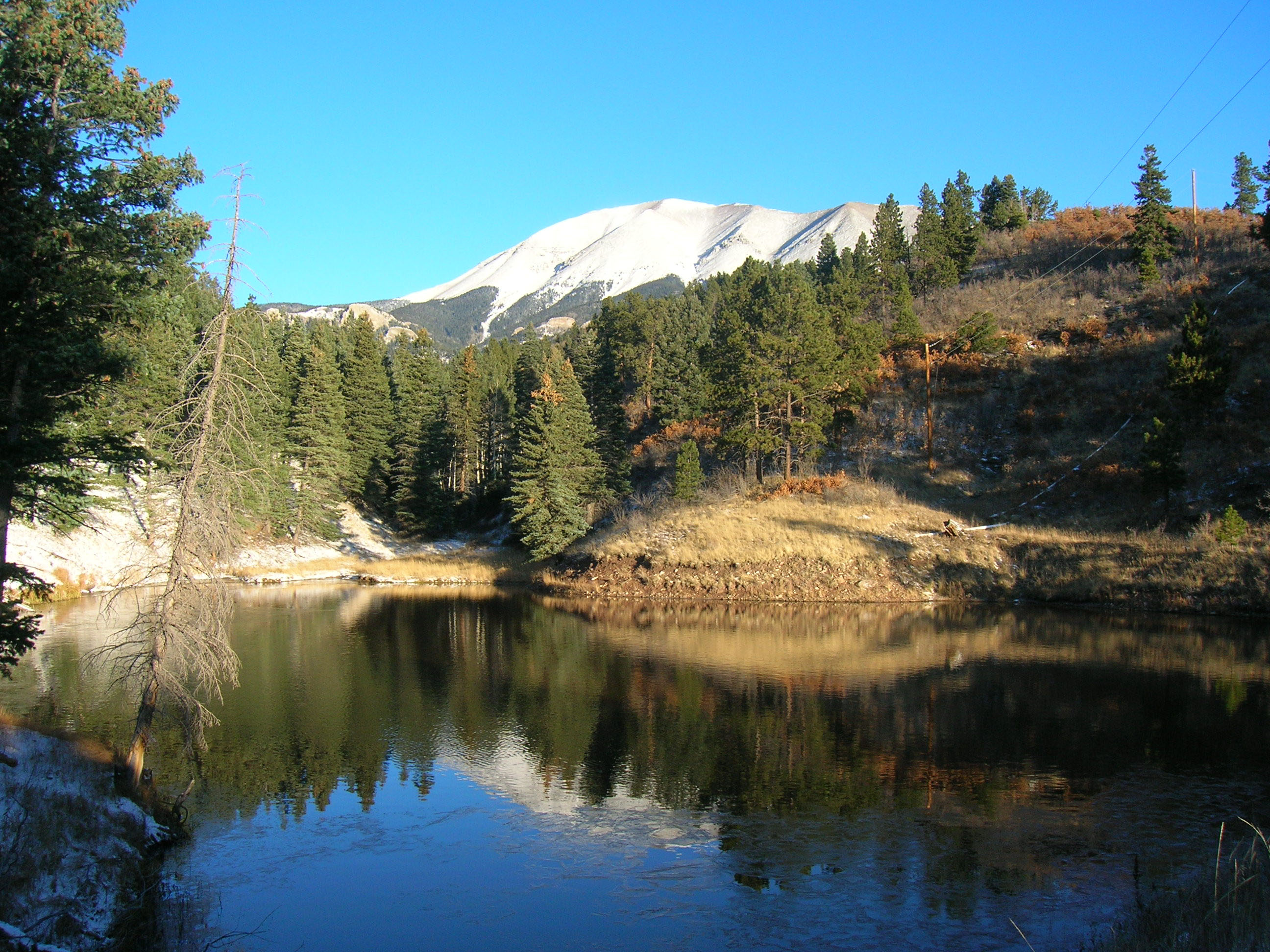
West Spanish Peak from the Highway of Legends

== See also ==
- History Colorado
