= Unaweep Tabeguache Scenic Byway =

Colorado Scenic and Historic Byway

Coordinates: 38.3666°N 108.7320°W

Route information
- Maintained by CDOT
- Length: 133 mi (214 km)
- Existed: 1990–present

Major junctions
- North end: US 50 / SH 141 Whitewater
- South end: SH 145 / SH 62 Placerville

Location
- Country: United States
- State: Colorado
- Counties: Mesa, Montrose, and San Miguel counties

Highway system
- Colorado State Highway System; Interstate; US; State; Scenic

The Unaweep Tabeguache Scenic Byway is a 133-mile (214 km) Colorado Scenic and Historic Byway located in Mesa, Montrose, and San Miguel counties, Colorado, USA. The byway explores the Colorado Plateau canyon country of far western Colorado.

The Unaweep Tabeguache Scenic Byway connects with the San Juan Skyway Scenic and Historic Byway at Placerville.

== See also ==
- History Colorado
- List of scenic byways in Colorado
- Scenic byways in the United States
