= Kebler Pass =

Mountain pass in Colorado, USA

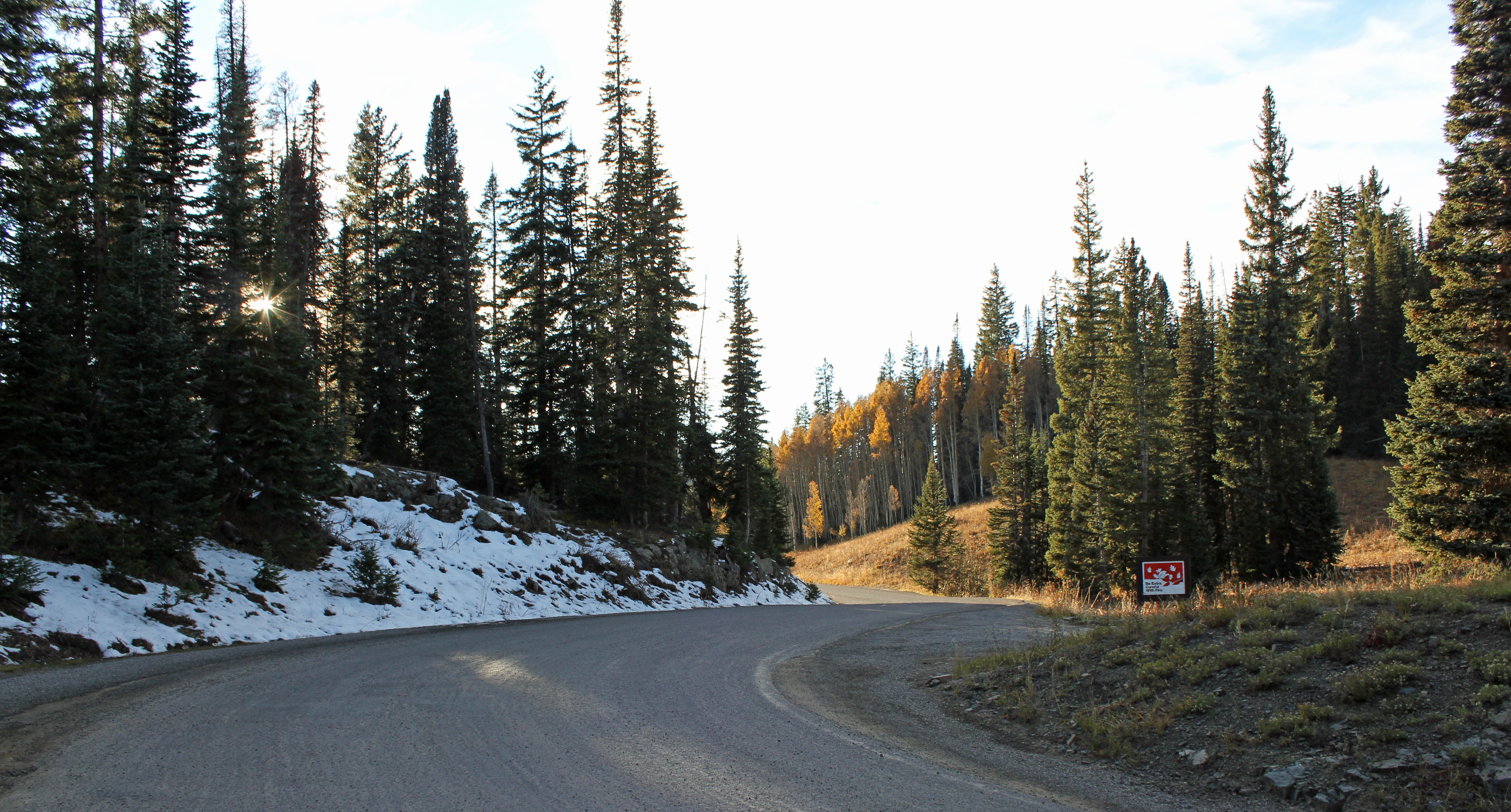
- A view of the top of the pass.
- Interactive map of Kebler Pass
- Elevation: 10,007 ft (3,050 m)
- Traversed by: Gunnison County Road 12

Third Approach
- Location: Gunnison County, Colorado, United States
- Range: West Elk Mountains
- Coordinates: 38°50′59″N 107°06′01″W
- Topo map: USGS Mount Axtell

Kebler Pass (el. 10,007 ft.) is a high mountain pass in Colorado.

The Colorado Department of Transportation designates the road as Gunnison County Road (GCR) 12. The eastern terminus of GCR 12 is Crested Butte. At its western terminus, GCR 12 intersects State Highway 133 near the southern end of Paonia State Park. It is a mostly gravel road and is closed during the winter months. A few portions of the road near the top of the pass have been paved. In the summer, the road is accessible by all passenger vehicles.

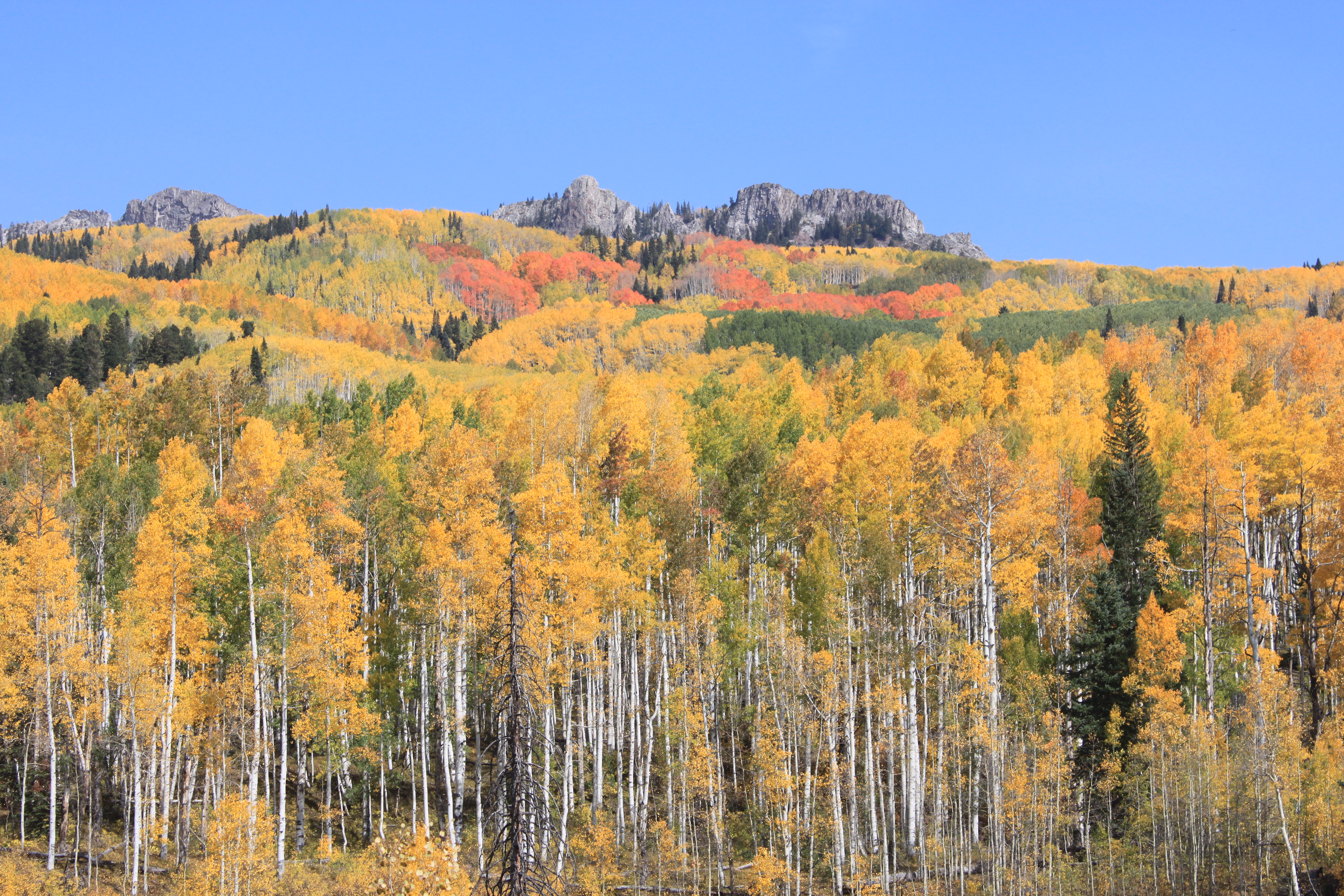
Riot of Fall Colors at Kebler Pass
