= Scenic byways in the United States =

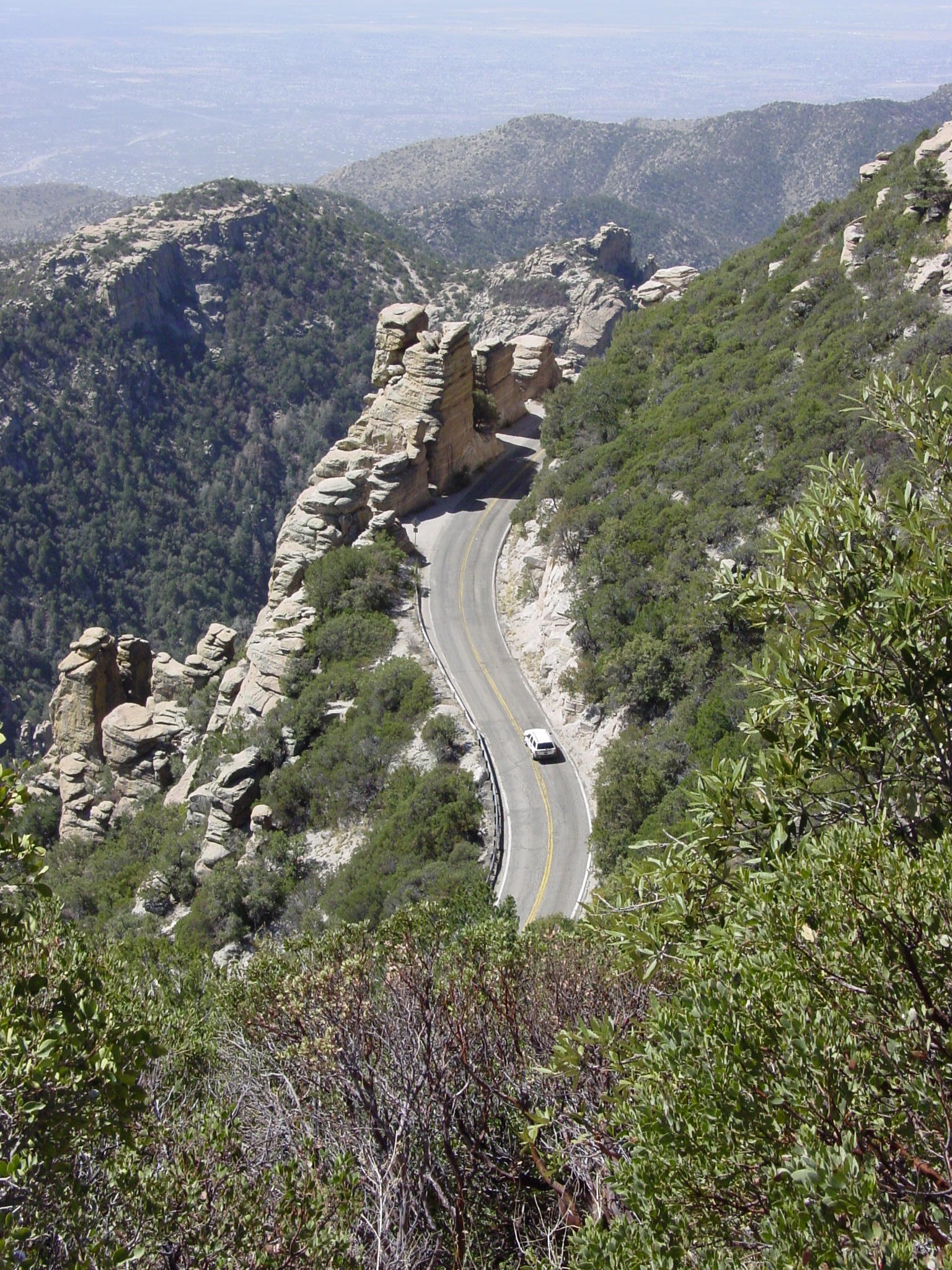
The Catalina Highway climbing Mount Lemmon in the U.S. state of Arizona

Many roads and highways in the United States are labeled scenic byways for having exceptional scenic, historical, archaeological, natural, cultural, or recreational significance. These scenic routes are usually formally designated by national, state, or local agencies in recognition of these qualities, and many are also preserved or managed with special legislation and funding beyond what is required for ordinary road maintenance.

== National ==
Marker used for National Scenic Byways

Several agencies of the United States federal government are authorized to designate and manage scenic byways. The National Scenic Byway Foundation, a not-for-profit organization, was founded in 2003 to support efforts for development, management, and marketing of scenic byways by the Federal Highway Administration and byway organizations. National scenic byways include:

- Bureau of Land Management Back Country Byways, designated by the Bureau of Land Management (U.S. Department of the Interior)
- National Forest Scenic Byways, initiated by the United States Forest Service (U.S. Department of Agriculture)
- National Scenic Byways, managed by the Federal Highway Administration (U.S. Department of Transportation)
  - Some National Scenic Byways are further classified as "All-American Roads," a higher status reserved for especially distinctive roadways. Both classifications are often collectively marketed under the term "America's Byways".
- National Parkways, managed by the National Park Service (U.S. Department of the Interior), are similar to the other federal scenic byway designations except that they protect not only the roadway but also an extensive corridor of surrounding parkland.

== State ==
Many individual state governments also sponsor programs for designating scenic byways, which is often the first step towards the designation of a National Scenic Byway by the Federal Highway Administration. Generally the state byways are nominated by local communities with the assistance of the state's department of natural resources and tourism offices and then designated by the state's department of transportation. Forty-eight U.S. states and the District of Columbia manage scenic byways programs that operate as part of the National Scenic Byways Program.

== Tribal ==
The Navajo National Scenic Byways were developed by a task force including the Arizona Department of Transportation and Bureau of Indian Affairs and are administered with the cooperation of the Federal Highway Administration.

== See also ==
- State wildlife trails
