= List of extreme summits of the Rocky Mountains =

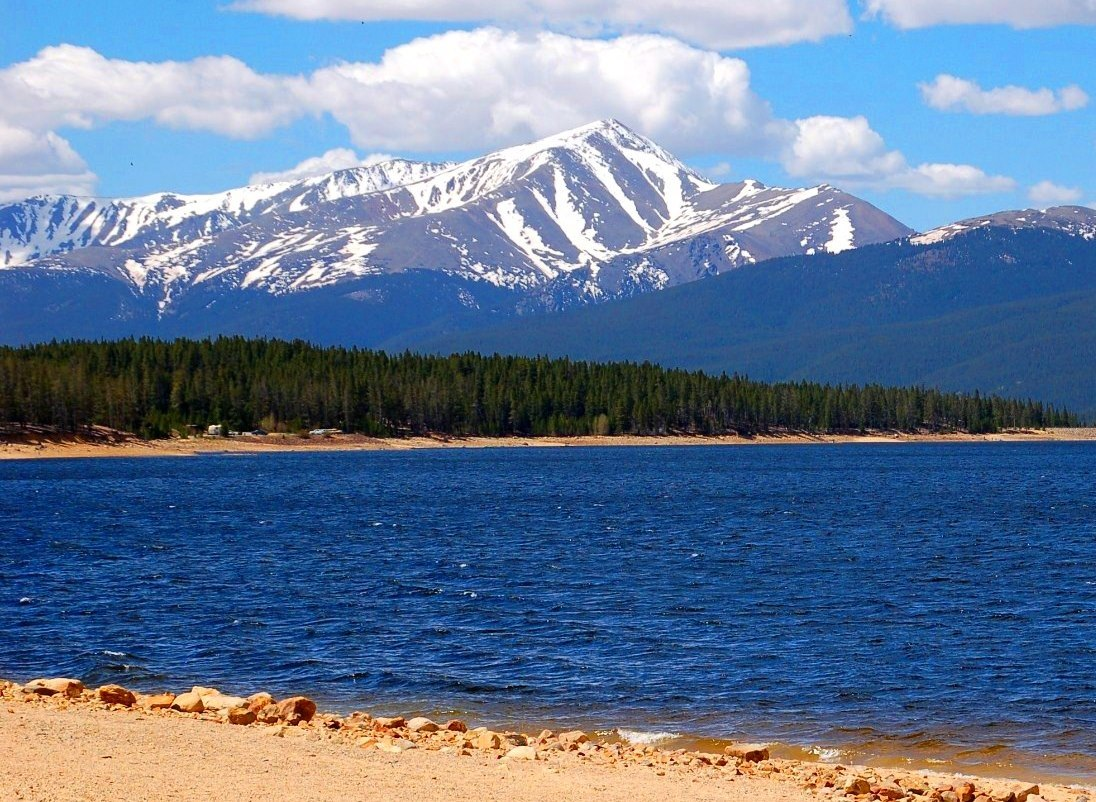
Mount Elbert in the Sawatch Range is the highest summit of the Rocky Mountains and the US State of Colorado.

This article comprises four sortable tables of mountain summits of the Rocky Mountains of North America that are the higher than any other point north or south of their latitude or east or west their longitude in those mountains.

The summit of a mountain or hill may be measured in three principal ways:

1. The topographic elevation of a summit measures the height of the summit above a geodetic sea level.
2. The topographic prominence of a summit is a measure of how high the summit rises above its surroundings.
3. The topographic isolation (or radius of dominance) of a summit measures how far the summit lies from its nearest point of equal elevation.

== Northernmost high summits ==
The northernmost summits of their elevation in the Rocky Mountains
| Rank | Mountain Peak | Region | Mountain range | Elevation | Prominence | Isolation | Location |
|---|---|---|---|---|---|---|---|
| 14 | Sentinel Peak (Note: The summit of Sentinel Peak is the highest point of the Murray Range.) (Note: Sentinel Peak is the northernmost and westernmost 2000-meter (6562-foot) summit of the Rocky Mountains.) | British Columbia | Canadian Rockies | 2513 m 8,245 ft | 1452 m 4,764 ft | 86.6 km 53.8 mi | 54.9080°N 121.9610°W |
| 13 | Mount Ida (Note: Mount Ida is the northernmost 3000-meter (9843-foot) summit and ultra-prominent summit of the Rocky Mountains.) | British Columbia | Canadian Rockies | 3200 m 10,499 ft | 1530 m 5,020 ft | 14.14 km 8.79 mi | 54.0580°N 120.3268°W |
| 12 | Mount Sir Alexander (Note: Mount Sir Alexander is the northernmost and westernmost 3000-meter (9843-foot) summit and ultra-prominent summit of the Rocky Mountains.) | British Columbia | Canadian Rockies | 3275 m 10,745 ft | 1762 m 5,781 ft | 87.8 km 54.5 mi | 53.9360°N 120.3869°W |
| 11 | Mount Chown (Note: Mount Chown is the northernmost and westernmost summit of its elevation in the Rocky Mountains.) | Alberta | Canadian Rockies | 3316 m 10,879 ft | 1746 m 5,728 ft | 30.7 km 19.05 mi | 53.3971°N 119.4173°W |
| 10 | Whitehorn Mountain (Note: Whitehorn Mountain is the northernmost and westernmost summit of its elevation in the Rocky Mountains.) | British Columbia | Canadian Rockies | 3399 m 11,152 ft | 1747 m 5,732 ft | 7.94 km 4.93 mi | 53.1370°N 119.2667°W |
| 9 | Mount Robson (Note: The summit of Mount Robson is the highest point of the Canadian Rockies.) (Note: Mount Robson is the easternmost summit of its elevation in Canada and the northernmost and westernmost summit of its elevation in the Rocky Mountains.) | British Columbia | Canadian Rockies | 3959 m 12,989 ft | 2829 m 9,281 ft | 460 km 286 mi | 53.1105°N 119.1566°W |
| 8 | Cloud Peak (Note: The summit of Cloud Peak is the highest point of the Bighorn Mountains.) (Note: Cloud Peak is the northernmost 4000-meter (13,123-foot) summit of the Rocky Mountains.) | Wyoming | Bighorn Mountains | 4013.3 m 13,167 ft | 2157 m 7,077 ft | 233 km 145 mi | 44.3821°N 107.1739°W |
| 7 | Grand Teton (Note: The summit of Grand Teton is the highest point of the Teton Range.) (Note: Grand Teton is the northernmost and westernmost 4000-meter (13,123-foot) summit of the Rocky Mountains.) | Wyoming | Teton Range | 4198.7 m 13,775 ft | 1995 m 6,545 ft | 111.6 km 69.4 mi | 43.7412°N 110.8024°W |
| 6 | Gannett Peak (Note: The summit of Gannett Peak is the highest point of the Wind River Range, the U.S. State of Wyoming, and the central Rocky Mountains.) (Note: Gannett Peak is the northernmost and westernmost summit of its elevation in the Rocky Mountains.) | Wyoming | Wind River Range | 4209.1 m 13,809 ft | 2157 m 7,076 ft | 467 km 290 mi | 43.1842°N 109.6542°W |
| 5 | Longs Peak (Note: The summit of Longs Peak is the highest point of the northern Front Range.) (Note: Longs Peak is the northernmost 14,000-foot (4267-meter) summit of the Rocky Mountains.) | Colorado | Front Range | 4346 m 14,259 ft | 896 m 2,940 ft | 70.2 km 43.6 mi | 40.2550°N 105.6151°W |
| 4 | Grays Peak (Note: The summit of Grays Peak is the highest point of the Front Range and the Continental Divide in North America.) (Note: Grays Peak is the northernmost summit of its elevation in the Rocky Mountains.) | Colorado | Front Range | 4352 m 14,278 ft | 844 m 2,770 ft | 40.2 km 25 mi | 39.6339°N 105.8176°W |
| 3 | Mount Lincoln (Note: The summit of Mount Lincoln is the highest point of the Mosquito Range and the entire Missouri River drainage basin.) (Note: Mount Lincoln is the northernmost summit of its elevation in the Rocky Mountains.) | Colorado | Mosquito Range | 4356.5 m 14,293 ft | 1177 m 3,862 ft | 36.2 km 22.5 mi | 39.3515°N 106.1116°W |
| 2 | Mount Massive (Note: Mount Massive is the second highest major summit of the Rocky Mountains.) (Note: The elevation of Mount Massive includes an adjustment of +2.087 m (6.85 ft) from NGVD 29 to NAVD 88.) | Colorado | Sawatch Range | 4398 m 14,428 ft | 598 m 1,961 ft | 8.14 km 5.06 mi | 39.1875°N 106.4757°W |
| 1 | Mount Elbert (Note: The summit of Mount Elbert is the highest point of the U.S. State of Colorado, the Rocky Mountains of North America, and the entire Mississippi River drainage basin.) | Colorado | Sawatch Range | 4401.2 m 14,440 ft | 2772 m 9,093 ft | 1,079.15 | 39.1178°N 106.4454°W |

== Southernmost high summits ==
The southernmost summits of their elevation in the Rocky Mountains
| Rank | Mountain Peak | Region | Mountain range | Elevation | Prominence | Isolation | Location |
|---|---|---|---|---|---|---|---|
| 7 | Santa Fe Baldy (Note: Santa Fe Baldy is the southernmost 3000-meter (9843-foot) summit of the Rocky Mountains.) | New Mexico | Santa Fe Mountains | 3850.1 m 12,632 ft | 610 m 2,002 ft | 17.69 km 10.99 mi | 35.8322°N 105.7581°W |
| 6 | Truchas Peak (Note: The summit of Truchas Peak is the highest point of the Santa Fe Mountains.) (Note: Truchas Peak is the southernmost summit of its elevation in the Rocky Mountains.) | New Mexico | Santa Fe Mountains | 3995.2 m 13,108 ft | 1220 m 4,001 ft | 68.2 km 42.3 mi | 35.9625°N 105.6450°W |
| 5 | Wheeler Peak (Note: The summit of Wheeler Peak is the highest point of the Taos Mountains and the U.S. State of New Mexico.) (Note: Wheeler Peak is the southernmost 4000-meter (13,123-foot) summit of the Rocky Mountains.) | New Mexico | Taos Mountains | 4013.3 m 13,167 ft | 1039 m 3,409 ft | 59.6 km 37 mi | 36.5569°N 105.4169°W |
| 4 | Culebra Peak (Note: The summit of Culebra Peak is the highest point of the Culebra Range.) (Note: Culebra Peak is the southernmost 14,000-foot (4267-meter) summit of the Rocky Mountains.) (Note: The elevation of Culebra Peak includes an adjustment of +1.74 m (5.71 ft) from NGVD 29 to NAVD 88.) | Colorado | Culebra Range | 4283 m 14,053 ft | 1471 m 4,827 ft | 56.9 km 35.4 mi | 37.1224°N 105.1858°W |
| 3 | Blanca Peak (Note: The summit of Blanca Peak is the highest point of the Sangre de Cristo Mountains and the entire Rio Grande drainage basin.) (Note: Blanca Peak is the southernmost ultra-prominent summit of the Rocky Mountains.) (Note: The elevation of Blanca Peak includes an adjustment of +1.755 m (5.76 ft) from NGVD 29 to NAVD 88.) | Colorado | Sangre de Cristo Mountains | 4374 m 14,351 ft | 1623 m 5,326 ft | 166.4 km 103.4 mi | 37.5775°N 105.4856°W |
| 2 | Mount Harvard (Note: The summit of Mount Harvard is the highest point of the Collegiate Peaks.) (Note: Mount Harvard is the southernmost and easternmost summit of its elevation in the Rocky Mountains.) | Colorado | Sawatch Range | 4395.6 m 14,421 ft | 719 m 2,360 ft | 24 km 14.92 mi | 38.9244°N 106.3207°W |
| 1 | Mount Elbert | Colorado | Sawatch Range | 4401.2 m 14,440 ft | 2772 m 9,093 ft | 1,079.15 | 39.1178°N 106.4454°W |

== Easternmost high summits ==
The easternmost summits of their elevation in the Rocky Mountains
| Rank | Mountain Peak | Region | Mountain range | Elevation | Prominence | Isolation | Location |
|---|---|---|---|---|---|---|---|
| 7 | Fishers Peak (Note: The summit of Fishers Peak is the highest point of Raton Mesa.) (Note: Fishers Peak is the easternmost summit of its elevation in the Rocky Mountains and the United States.) | Colorado | Raton Mesa | 2936.2 m 9,633 ft | 563 m 1,847 ft | 49.9 km 31 mi | 37.0982°N 104.4628°W |
| 6 | East Spanish Peak (Note: East Spanish Peak is the easternmost 3000-meter (9843-foot) summit of the Rocky Mountains and the United States.) (Note: The elevation of East Spanish Peak includes an adjustment of +1.372 m (4.5 ft) from NGVD 29 to NAVD 88.) | Colorado | Spanish Peaks | 3867 m 12,688 ft | 726 m 2,383 ft | 6.78 km 4.21 mi | 37.3934°N 104.9201°W |
| 5 | West Spanish Peak (Note: West Spanish Peak is the easternmost 4000-meter (13,123-foot) summit of the Rocky Mountains and the United States.) (Note: The elevation of West Spanish Peak includes an adjustment of +1.468 m (4.82 ft) from NGVD 29 to NAVD 88.) | Colorado | Spanish Peaks | 4155 m 13,631 ft | 1123 m 3,686 ft | 32 km 19.87 mi | 37.3756°N 104.9934°W |
| 4 | Pikes Peak (Note: Pikes Peak is the easternmost 14,000-foot (4267-meter) summit and ultra-prominent summit of the Rocky Mountains. Pikes Peak was the inspiration for the lyrics of America the Beautiful.) | Colorado | Front Range | 4302.31 m 14,115 ft | 1686 m 5,530 ft | 97.6 km 60.6 mi | 38.8405°N 105.0442°W |
| 3 | Blanca Peak | Colorado | Sangre de Cristo Mountains | 4374 m 14,351 ft | 1623 m 5,326 ft | 166.4 km 103.4 mi | 37.5775°N 105.4856°W |
| 2 | Mount Harvard | Colorado | Sawatch Range | 4395.6 m 14,421 ft | 719 m 2,360 ft | 24 km 14.92 mi | 38.9244°N 106.3207°W |
| 1 | Mount Elbert | Colorado | Sawatch Range | 4401.2 m 14,440 ft | 2772 m 9,093 ft | 1,079.15 | 39.1178°N 106.4454°W |

== Westernmost high summits ==
The westernmost summits of their elevation in the Rocky Mountains
| Rank | Mountain Peak | Region | Mountain range | Elevation | Prominence | Isolation | Location |
|---|---|---|---|---|---|---|---|
| 11 | Sentinel Peak | British Columbia | Canadian Rockies | 2513 m 8,245 ft | 1452 m 4,764 ft | 86.6 km 53.8 mi | 54.9080°N 121.9610°W |
| 10 | Mount Sir Alexander | British Columbia | Canadian Rockies | 3275 m 10,745 ft | 1762 m 5,781 ft | 87.8 km 54.5 mi | 53.9360°N 120.3869°W |
| 9 | Mount Chown | Alberta | Canadian Rockies | 3316 m 10,879 ft | 1746 m 5,728 ft | 30.7 km 19.05 mi | 53.3971°N 119.4173°W |
| 8 | Whitehorn Mountain | British Columbia | Canadian Rockies | 3399 m 11,152 ft | 1747 m 5,732 ft | 7.94 km 4.93 mi | 53.1370°N 119.2667°W |
| 7 | Mount Robson | British Columbia | Canadian Rockies | 3959 m 12,989 ft | 2829 m 9,281 ft | 460 km 286 mi | 53.1105°N 119.1566°W |
| 6 | Grand Teton | Wyoming | Teton Range | 4198.7 m 13,775 ft | 1995 m 6,545 ft | 111.6 km 69.4 mi | 43.7412°N 110.8024°W |
| 5 | Gannett Peak | Wyoming | Wind River Range | 4209.1 m 13,809 ft | 2157 m 7,076 ft | 467 km 290 mi | 43.1842°N 109.6542°W |
| 4 | Mount Wilson (Note: The summit of Mount Wilson is the highest point of the San Miguel Mountains.) (Note: Mount Wilson is the westernmost summit of its elevation in the Rocky Mountains.) (Note: The elevation of Mount Wilson includes an adjustment of +1.899 m (6.23 ft) from NGVD 29 to NAVD 88.) | Colorado | San Miguel Mountains | 4344 m 14,252 ft | 1227 m 4,024 ft | 53.1 km 33 mi | 37.8391°N 107.9916°W |
| 3 | Uncompahgre Peak (Note: The summit of Uncompahgre Peak is the highest point of the San Juan Mountains and the entire Gulf of California drainage basin.) (Note: Uncompahgre Peak is the westernmost summit of its elevation in the Rocky Mountains.) | Colorado | San Juan Mountains | 4365 m 14,321 ft | 1304 m 4,277 ft | 136.8 km 85 mi | 38.0717°N 107.4621°W |
| 2 | Mount Massive | Colorado | Sawatch Range | 4398 m 14,428 ft | 598 m 1,961 ft | 8.14 km 5.06 mi | 39.1875°N 106.4757°W |
| 1 | Mount Elbert | Colorado | Sawatch Range | 4401.2 m 14,440 ft | 2772 m 9,093 ft | 1,079.15 | 39.1178°N 106.4454°W |

== Gallery ==
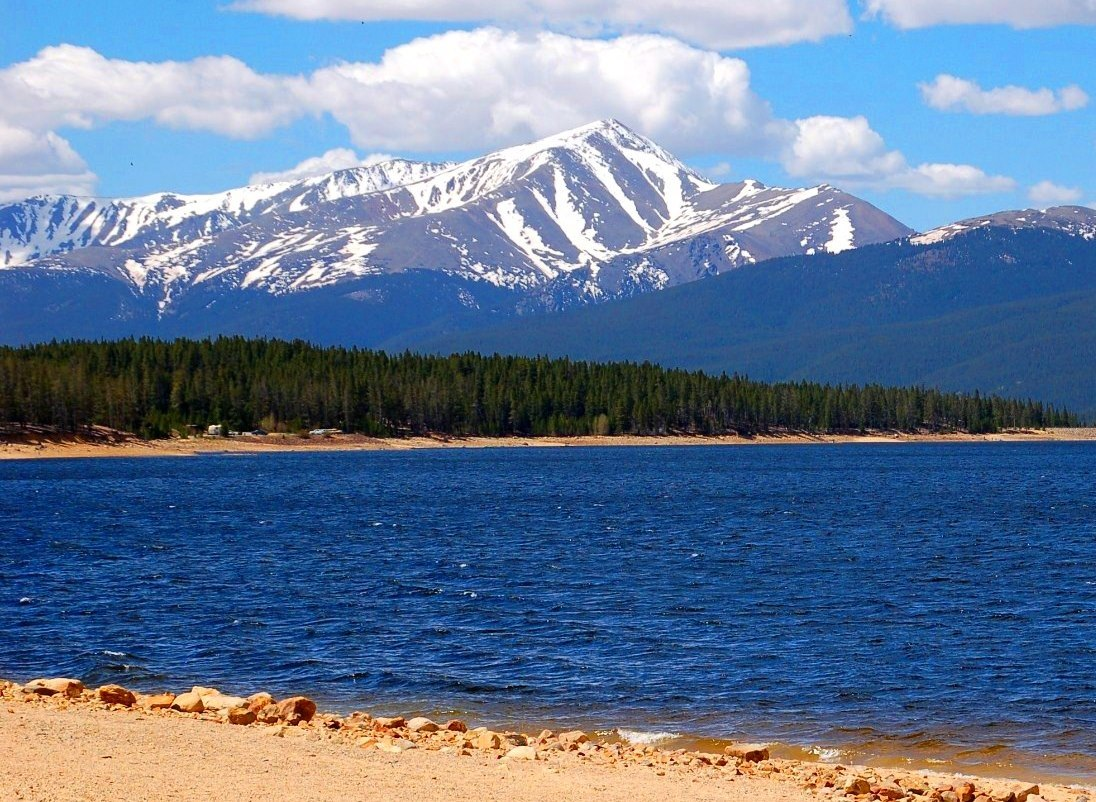
Mount Elbert in the Sawatch Range is the highest summit of the Rocky Mountains and the US State of Colorado.

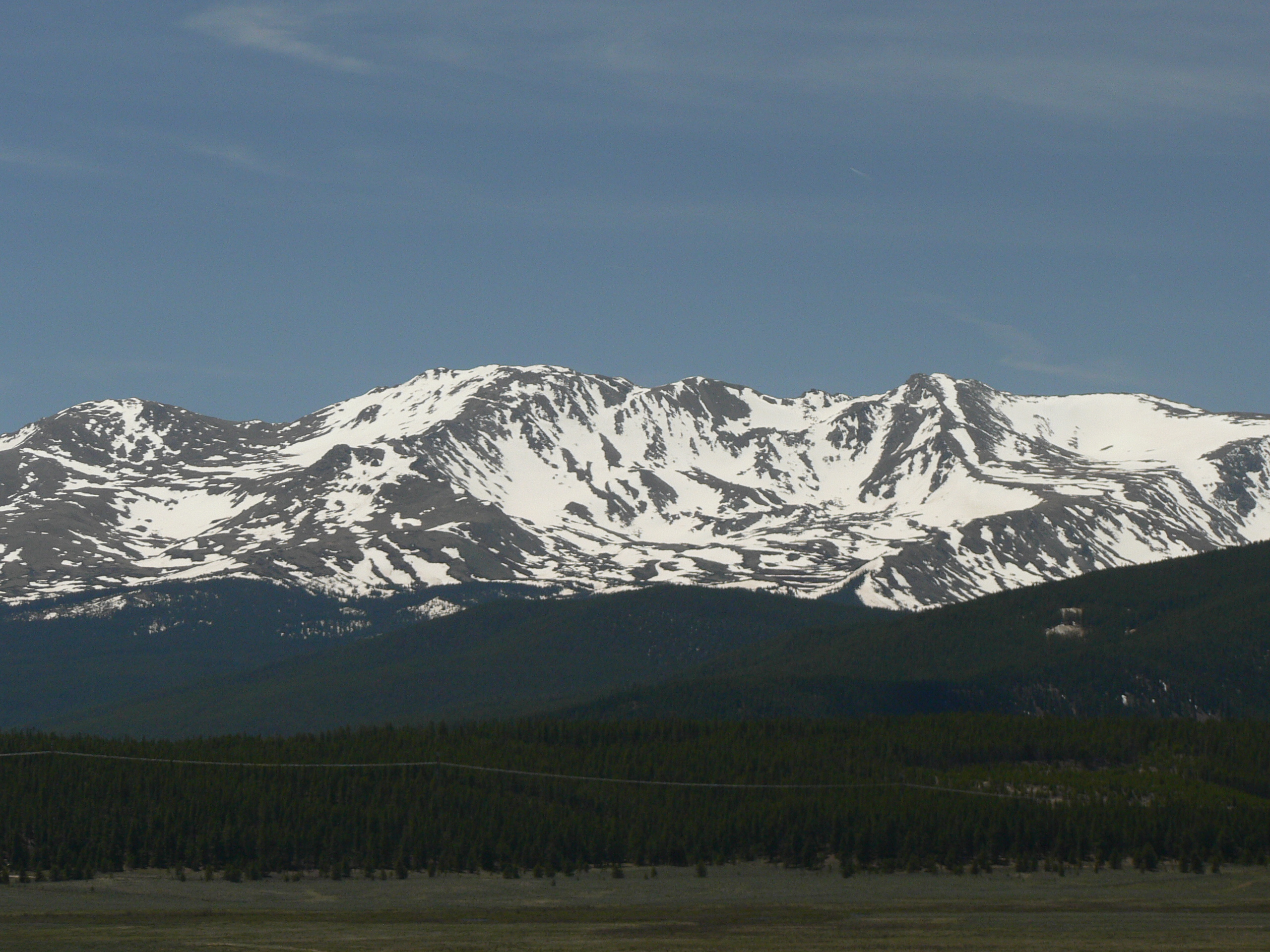
Mount Massive in the Sawatch Range of Colorado is the second highest summit of the Rocky Mountains.

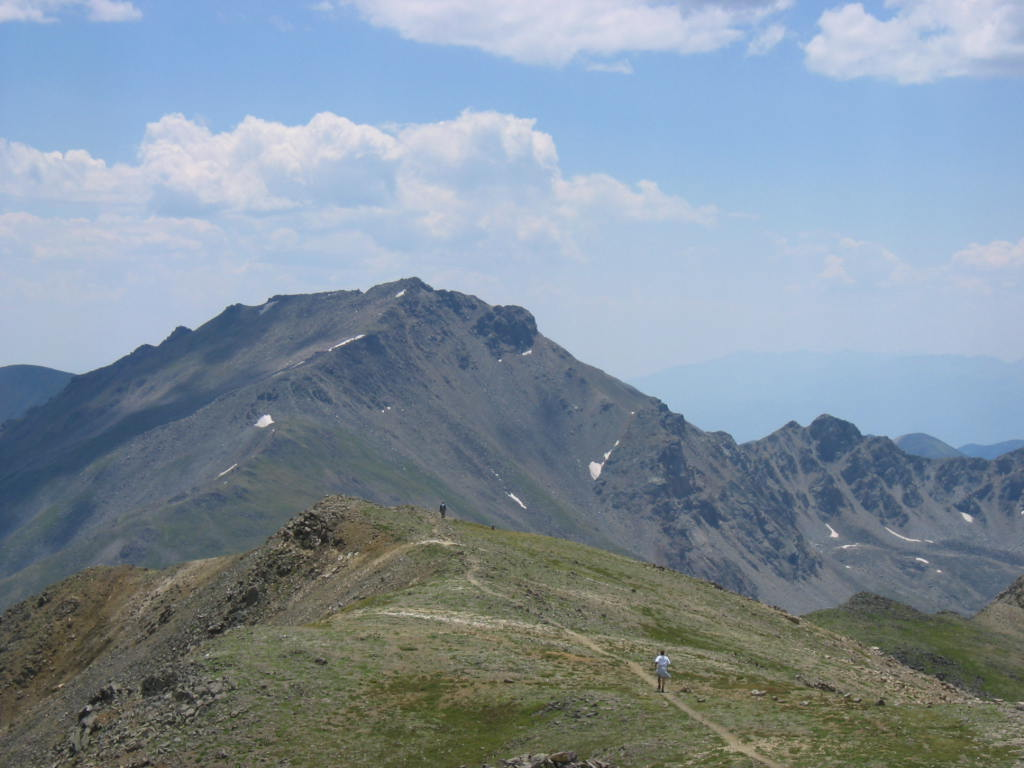
Mount Harvard is the highest summit of the Collegiate Peaks of Colorado.

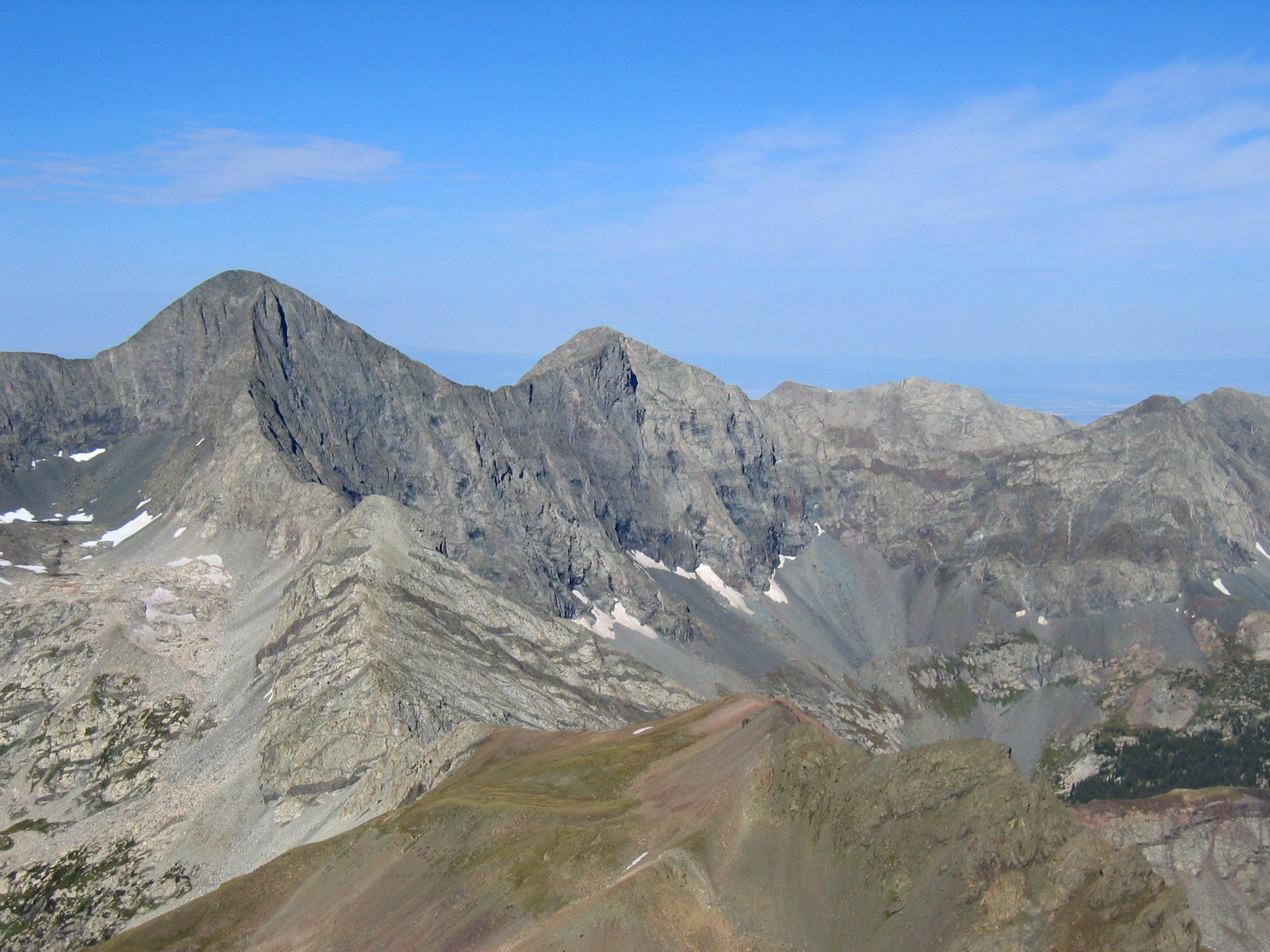
Blanca Peak is the highest summit of the Sangre de Cristo Mountains of Colorado.

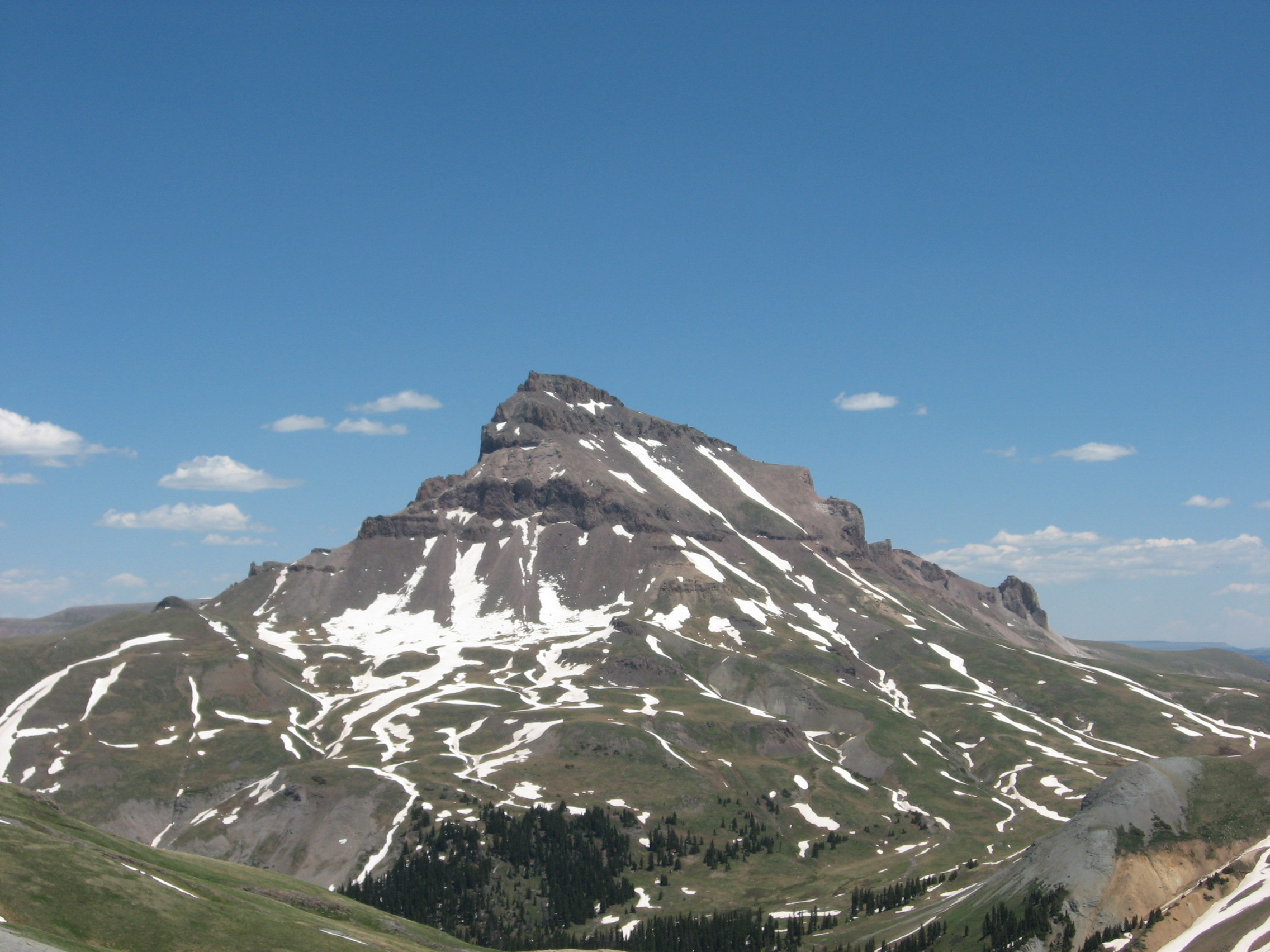
Uncompahgre Peak is the highest summit of the San Juan Mountains of Colorado.

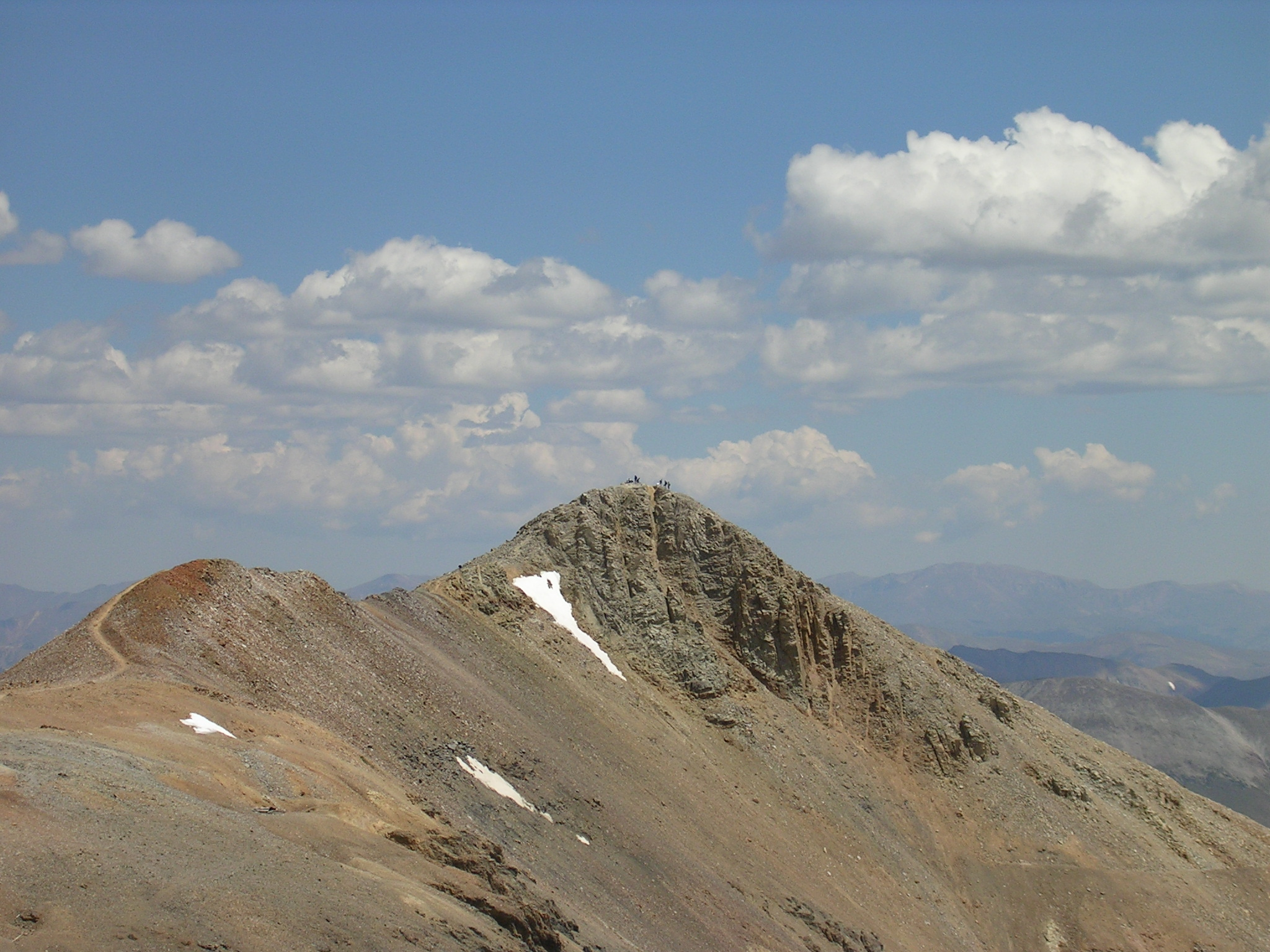
Mount Lincoln is the highest summit of the Mosquito Range of Colorado.

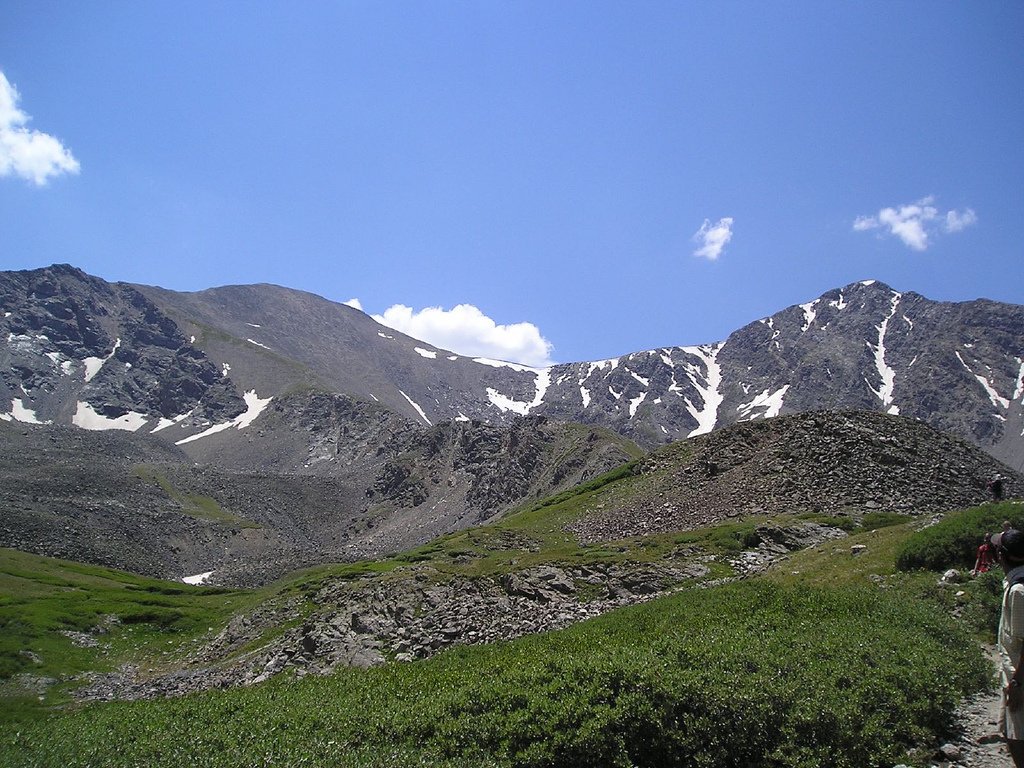
Grays Peak is the highest summit of the Front Range of Colorado and the highest point on the Continental Divide in North America.

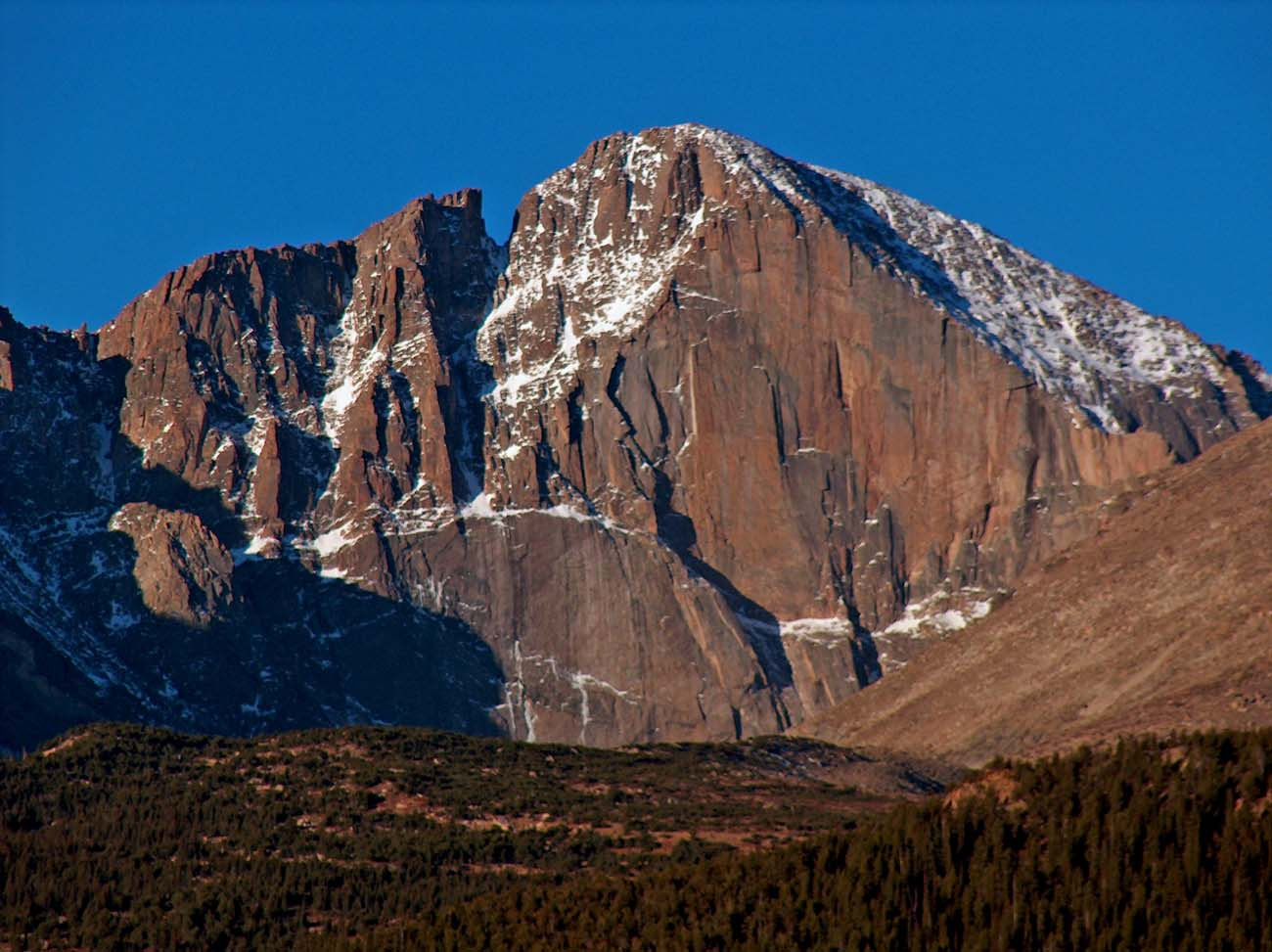
Longs Peak is the highest summit of the northern Front Range of Colorado.

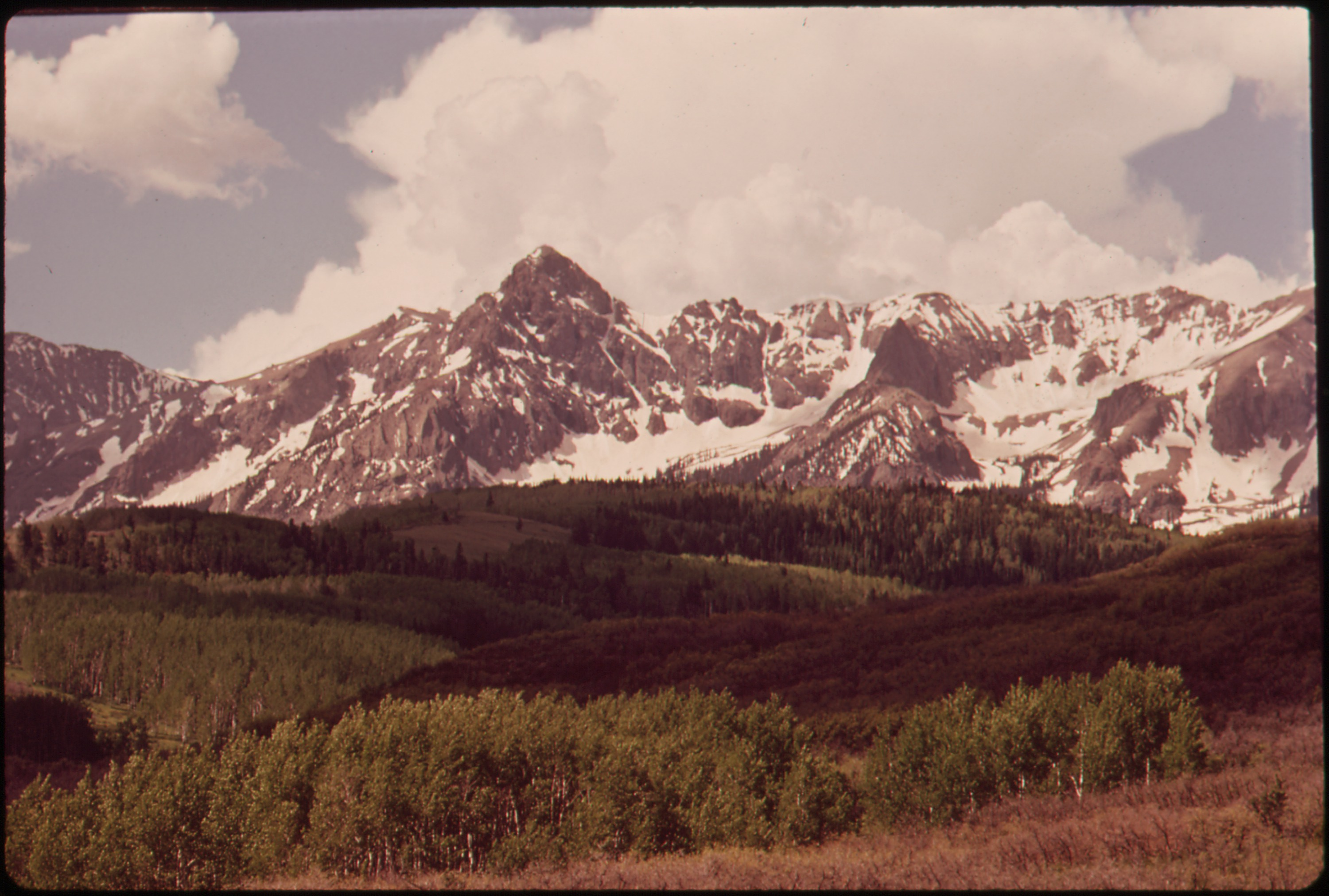
Mount Wilson is the highest summit of the San Miguel Mountains of Colorado.

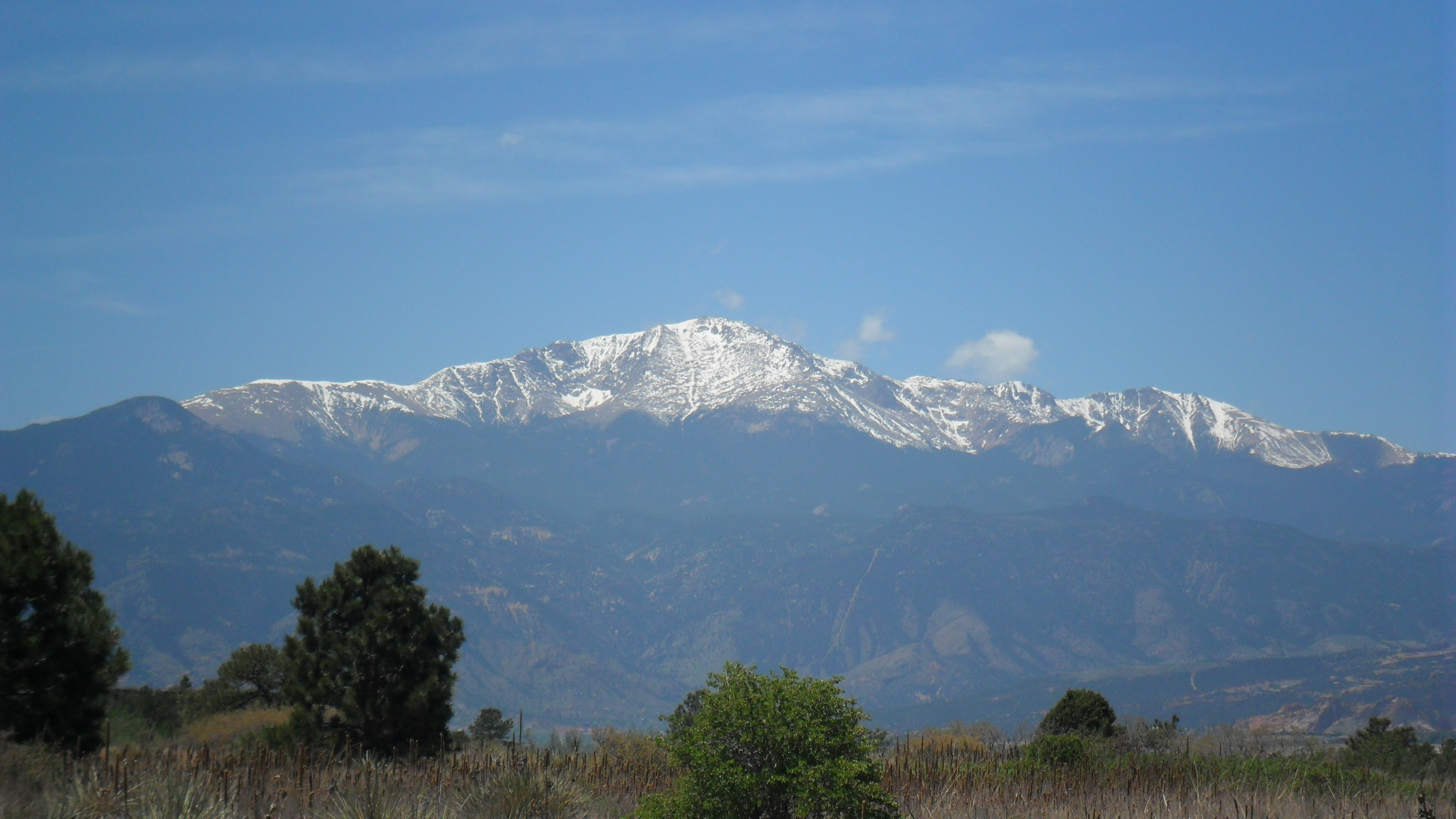
Pikes Peak in Colorado was the inspiration for America the Beautiful.

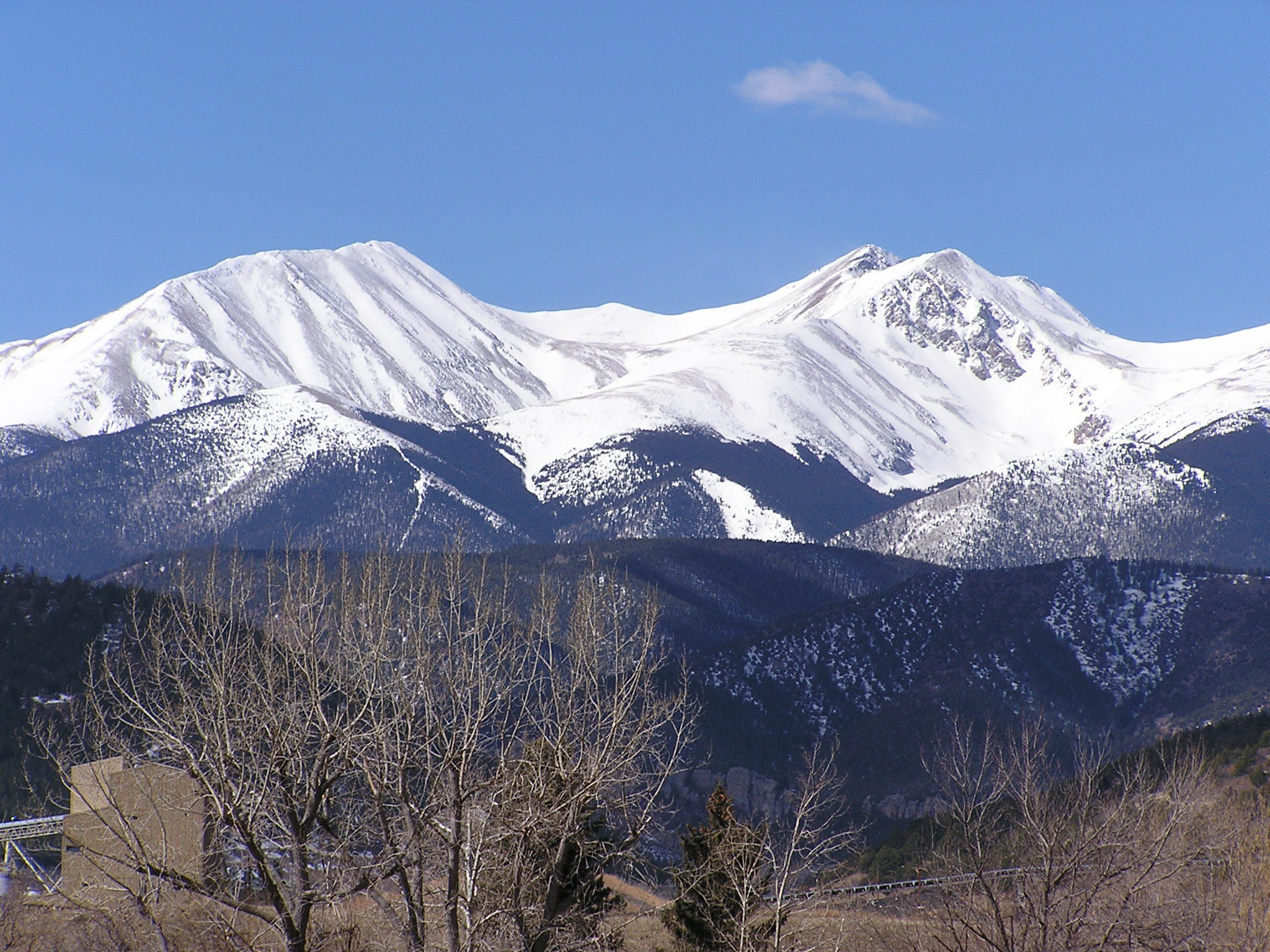
Culebra Peak in Colorado is the highest summit of the Culebra Range.

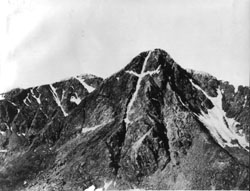
This photograph of the legendary Mount of the Holy Cross in Colorado was taken by William Henry Jackson in 1874.

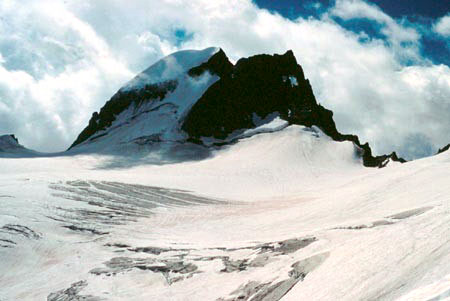
Gannett Peak is the highest summit of the Wind River Range, the US State of Wyoming, and the Central Rocky Mountains.

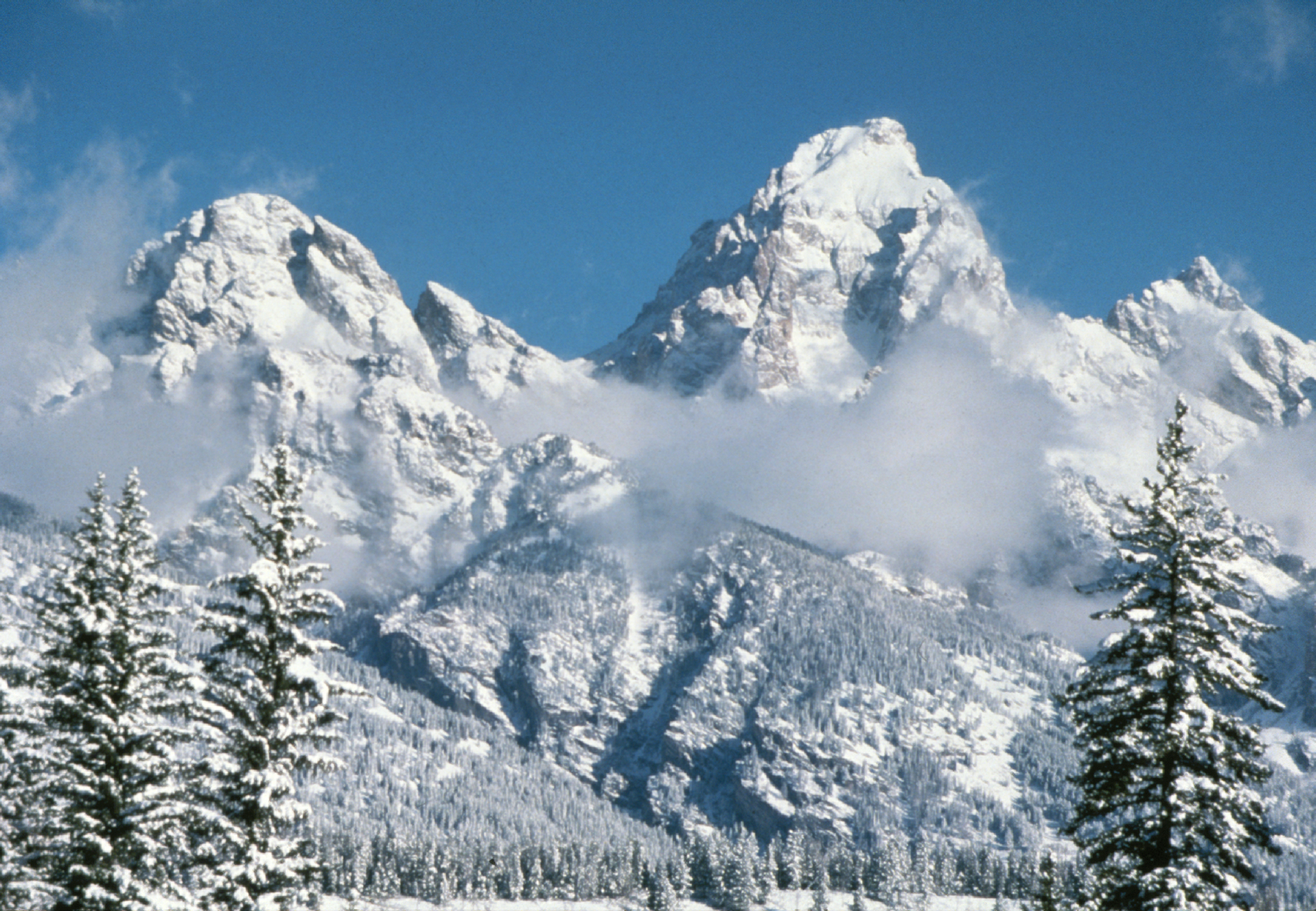
Grand Teton is the highest summit of the Teton Range of Wyoming.

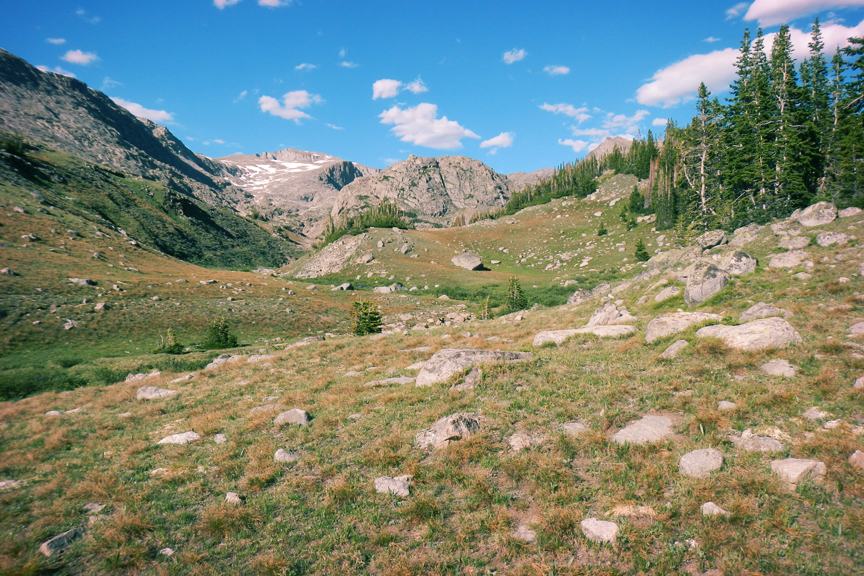
Cloud Peak is the highest summit of the Big Horn Mountains of Wyoming.

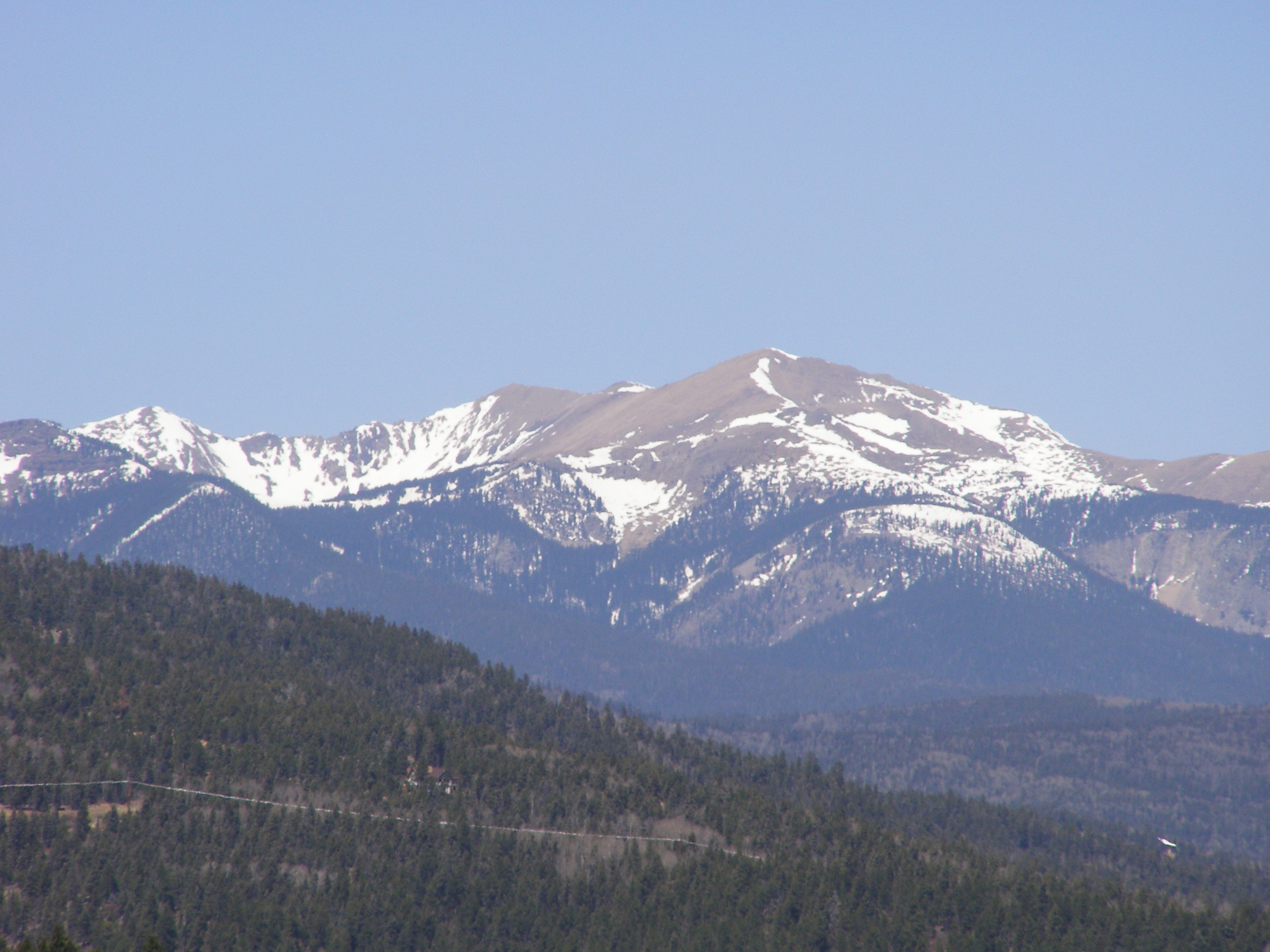
Wheeler Peak in the Sangre de Cristo Mountains is the highest point of the US State of New Mexico.

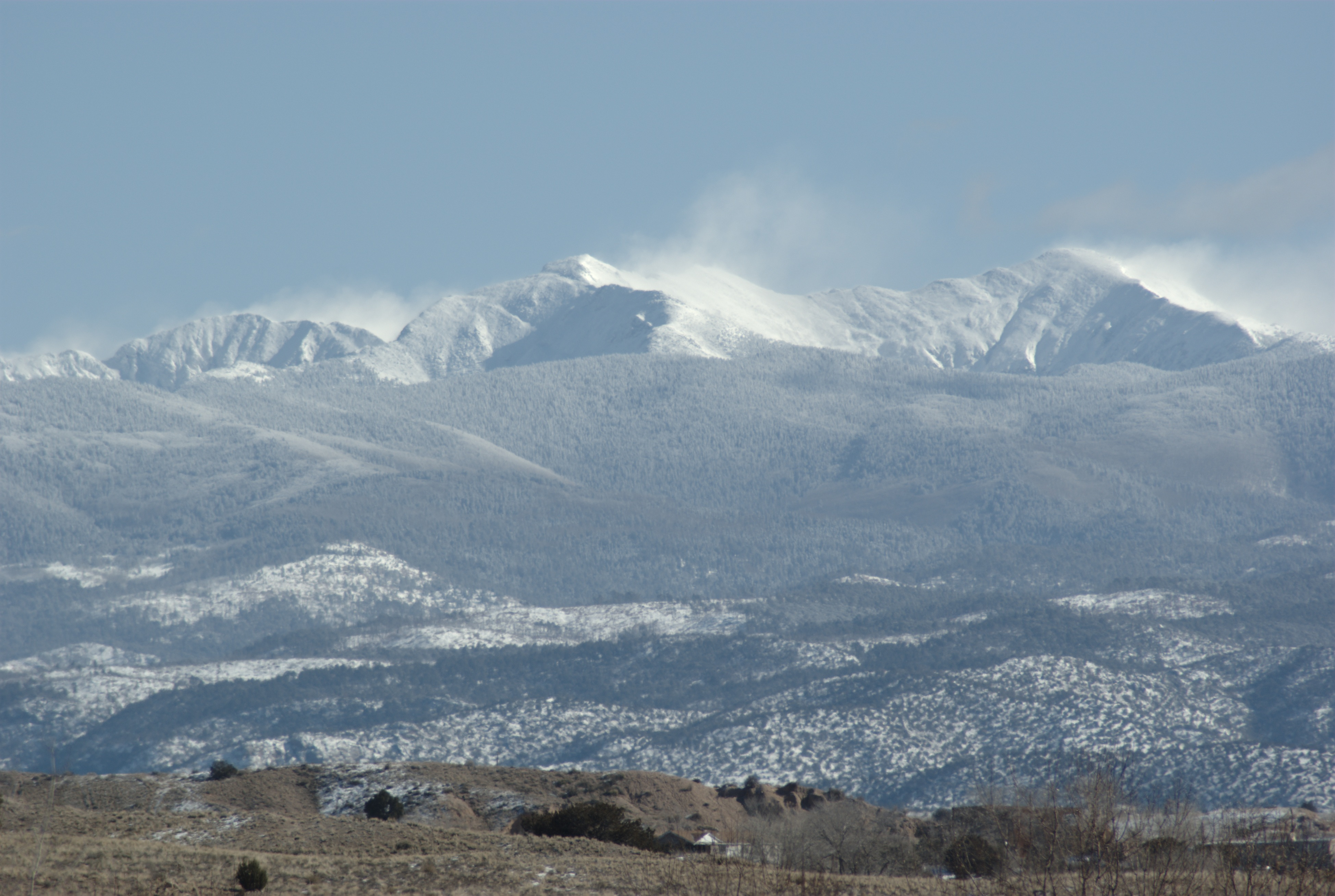
Truchas Peak is the highest summit of the Santa Fe Mountains of New Mexico.

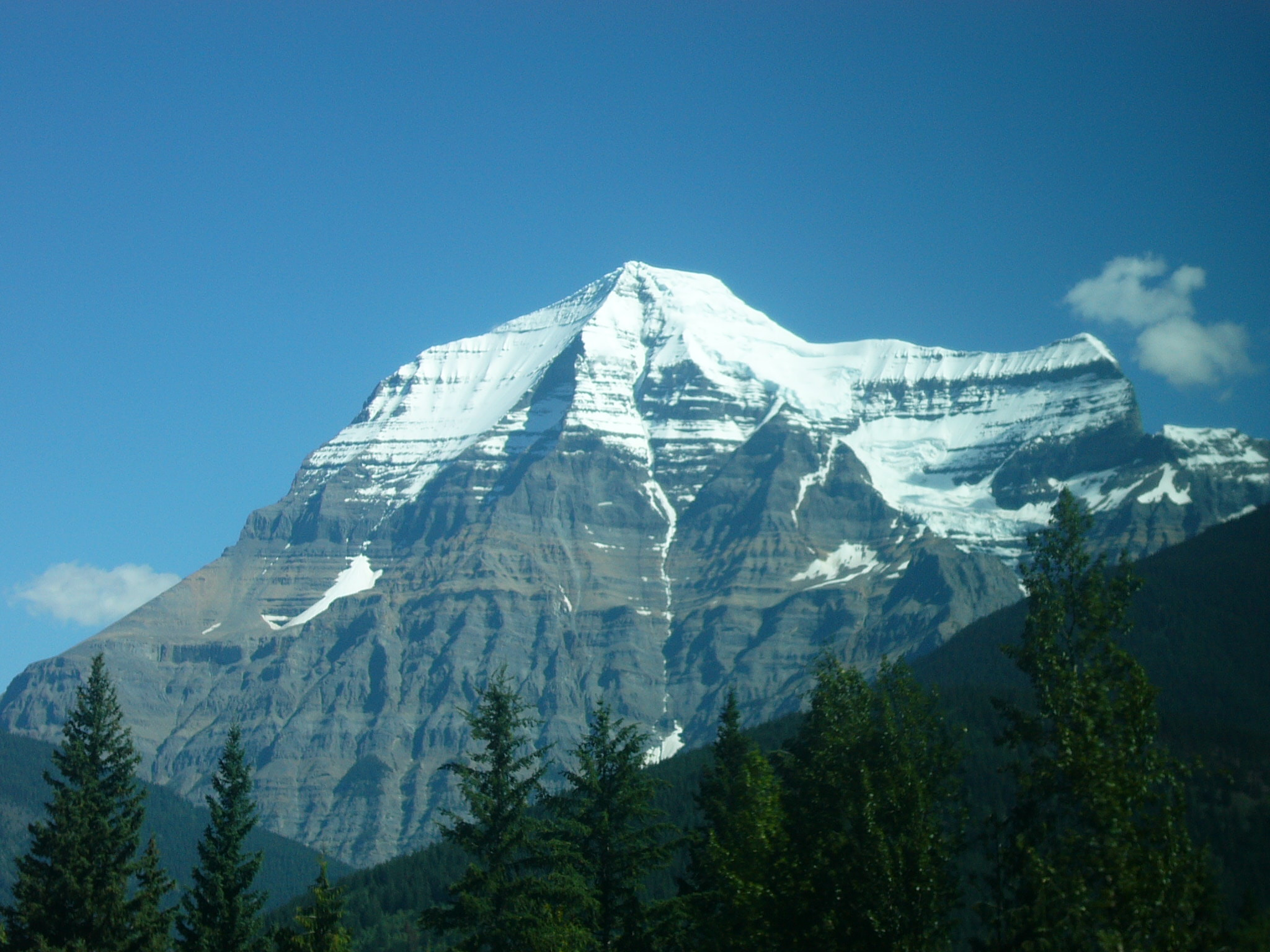
Mount Robson in British Columbia is the highest summit of the Canadian Rockies and the most prominent summit of the Rocky Mountains.

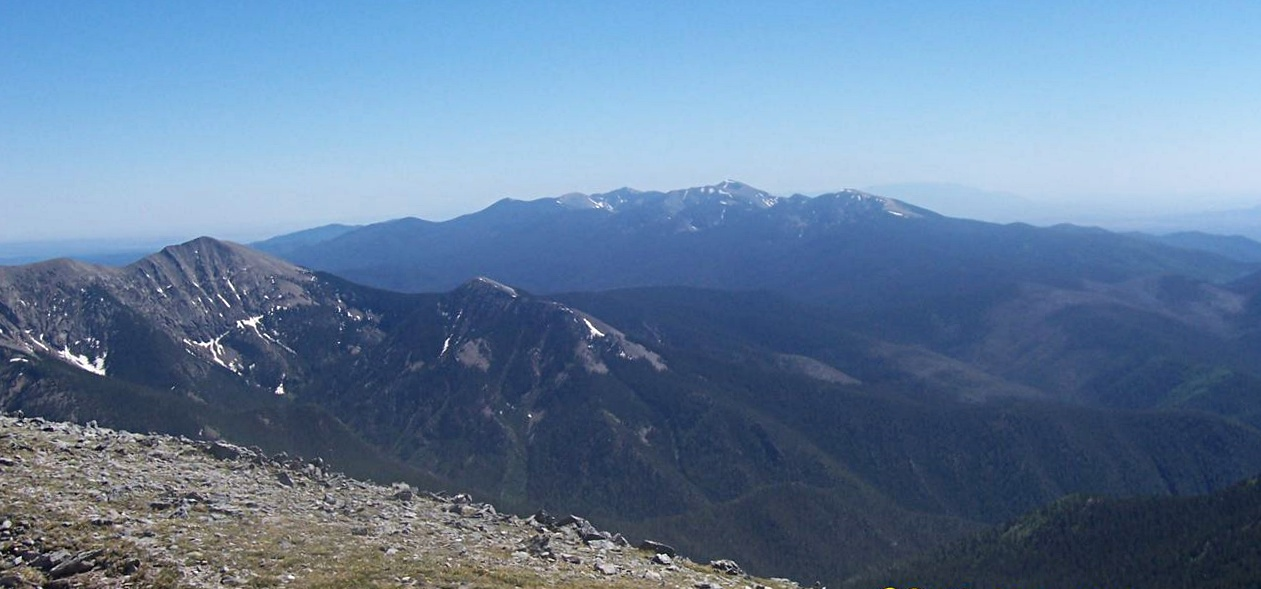
Santa Fe Baldy in New Mexico is the southernmost 3000-meter (9843-foot) summit of the Rocky Mountains.

== See also ==
- Rocky Mountains
  - Geology of the Rocky Mountains
    - Category:Rocky Mountains
      - commons:Category:Rocky Mountains
- List of mountain peaks of North America
  - List of mountain peaks of Greenland
  - List of mountain peaks of Canada
  - List of mountain peaks of the Rocky Mountains
    - List of the major 4000-meter summits of the Rocky Mountains
    - List of the major 3000-meter summits of the Rocky Mountains
    - List of the ultra-prominent summits of the Rocky Mountains
    - List of the major 100-kilometer summits of the Rocky Mountains
    - List of extreme summits of the Rocky Mountains
  - List of mountain peaks of the United States
  - List of mountain peaks of México
  - List of mountain peaks of Central America
  - List of mountain peaks of the Caribbean
- Physical geography
  - Topography
    - Topographic elevation
    - Topographic prominence
    - Topographic isolation
