= East Spanish Peak =

Mountain in Colorado, United States

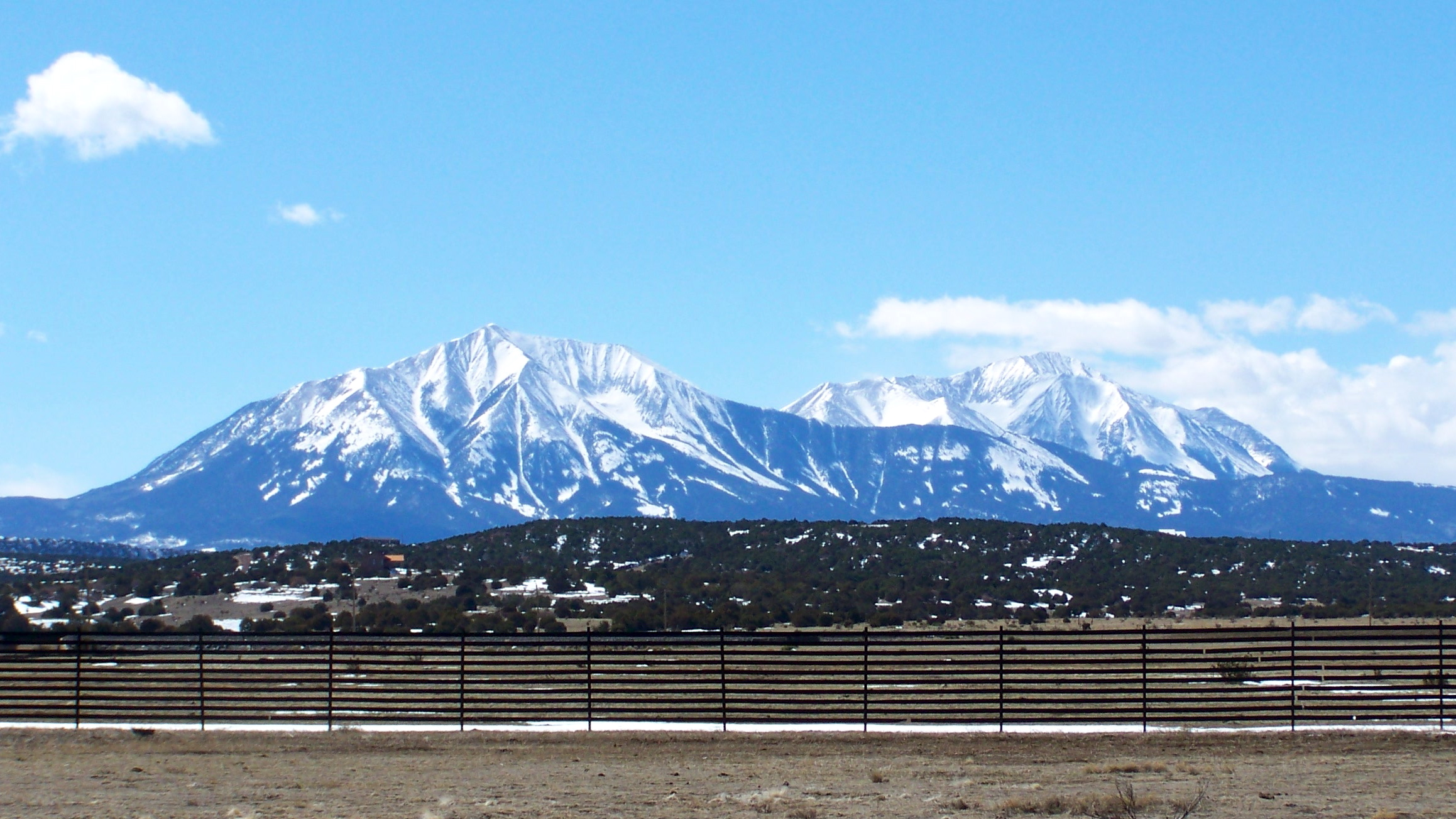
- East (left) and West (right) Spanish Peaks

Highest point
- Elevation: 12,688 ft (3,867 m)
- Prominence: 2,383 ft (726 m)
- Parent peak: West Spanish Peak
- Isolation: 4.21 mi (6.78 km)
- Listing: Colorado prominent summits
- Coordinates: 37°23′36″N 104°55′12″W

Geography
- Location within Colorado
- Location: Huerfano and Las Animas counties, Colorado, United States
- Parent range: Sangre de Cristo Mountains, Spanish Peaks
- Topo map(s): USGS 7.5' topographic map Spanish Peaks, Colorado

Climbing
- Easiest route: West Ridge: hike/scramble class 2

East Spanish Peak is a prominent mountain summit that is the lower of the two Spanish Peaks in the Rocky Mountains of North America. The 12,688-foot (3,867 m) peak is located in the Spanish Peaks Wilderness of San Isabel National Forest, 9.3 miles (14.9 km) southeast by south (bearing 148°) of the Town of La Veta, Colorado, United States, on the drainage divide between Huerfano and Las Animas counties. The Spanish Peaks are two large igneous stocks which form an eastern outlier of the Culebra Range, a subrange of the Sangre de Cristo Mountains. East Spanish Peak is higher than any point in the United States east of its longitude; it is also the easternmost point in the United States over 12,000 feet (3,700 m), 11,000 feet (3,400 m), and 10,000 feet (3,000 m) feet above sea level.

== Geology ==
East Spanish Peak is the younger of the two Spanish Peaks stocks and was intruded 23.36 +/- 0.18 million years ago. The stock consists of a granite porphyry core surrounded by granodiorite porphyry. It is likely that the granite porphyry represents the upper portion of the magma chamber, the top of which eroded to expose at the summit the less-evolved larger portion of the magma chamber consisting of granodiorite porphyry.

== Hiking/climbing ==
The standard ascent route for East Spanish Peak ascends the west ridge of the peak from the saddle between it and West Spanish Peak. A trail ascends to the saddle from the north side of the peaks.

== Gallery ==
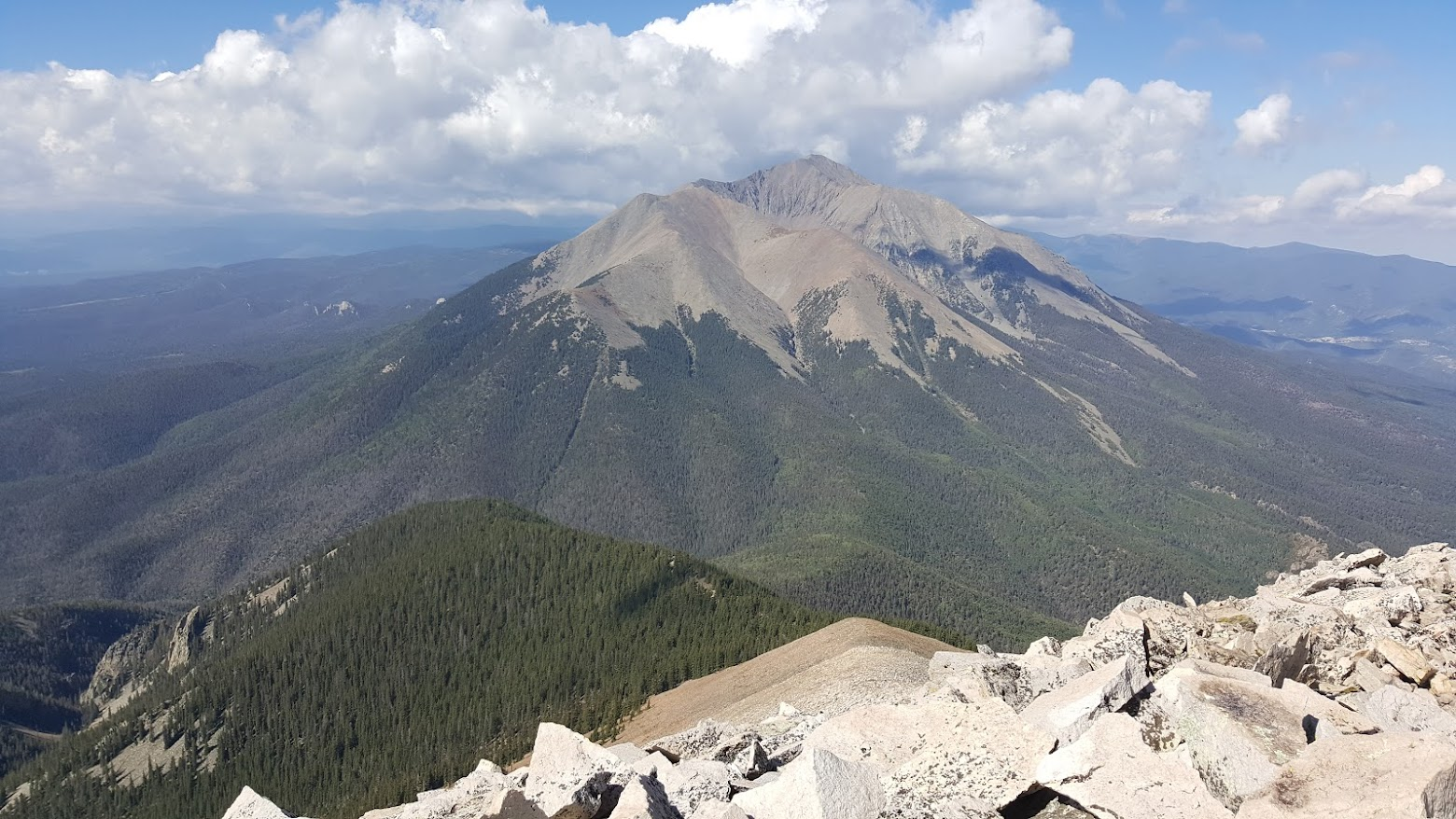
West Spanish Peak seen from East Spanish Peak.

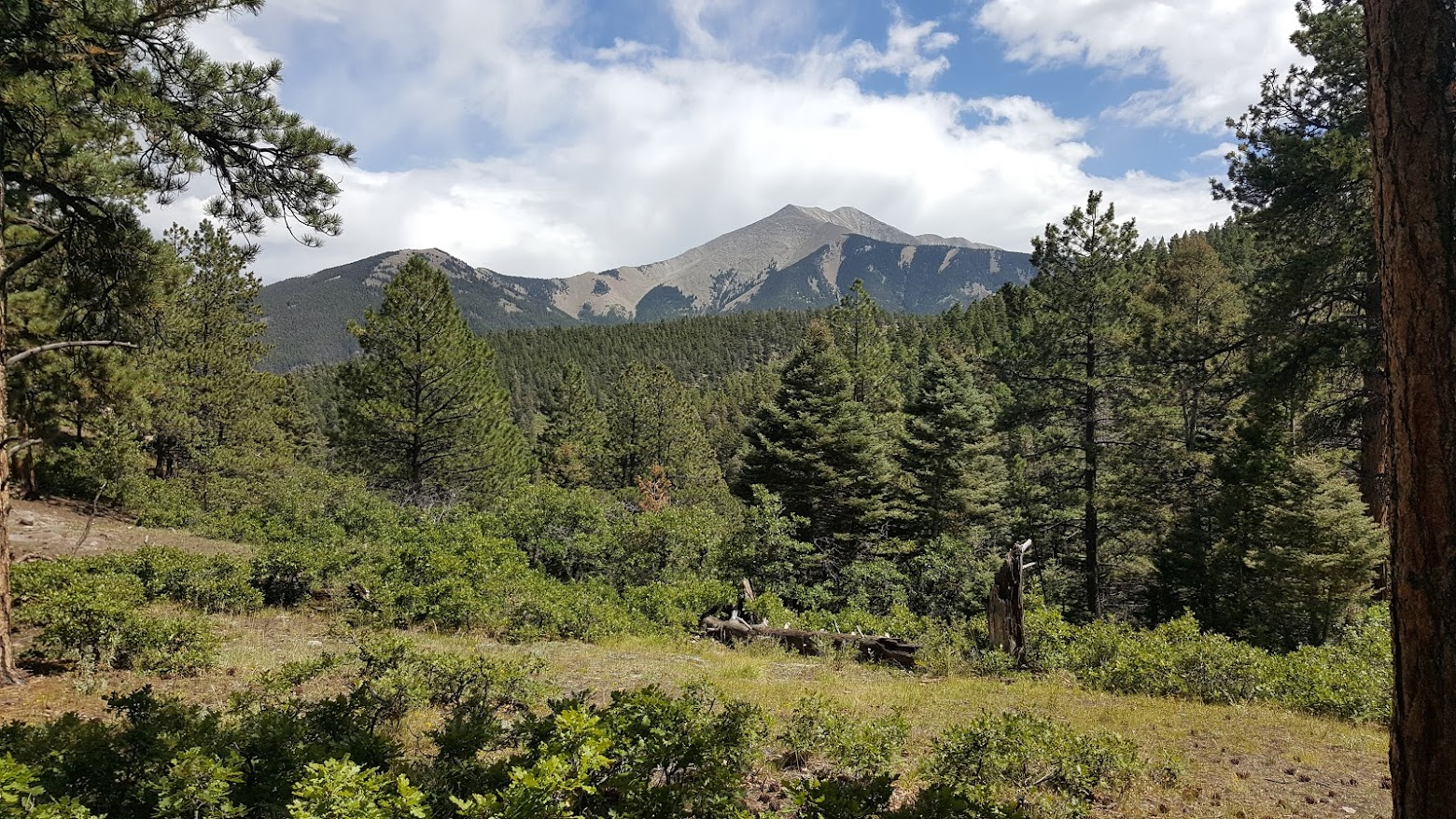
East Spanish Peak seen from below

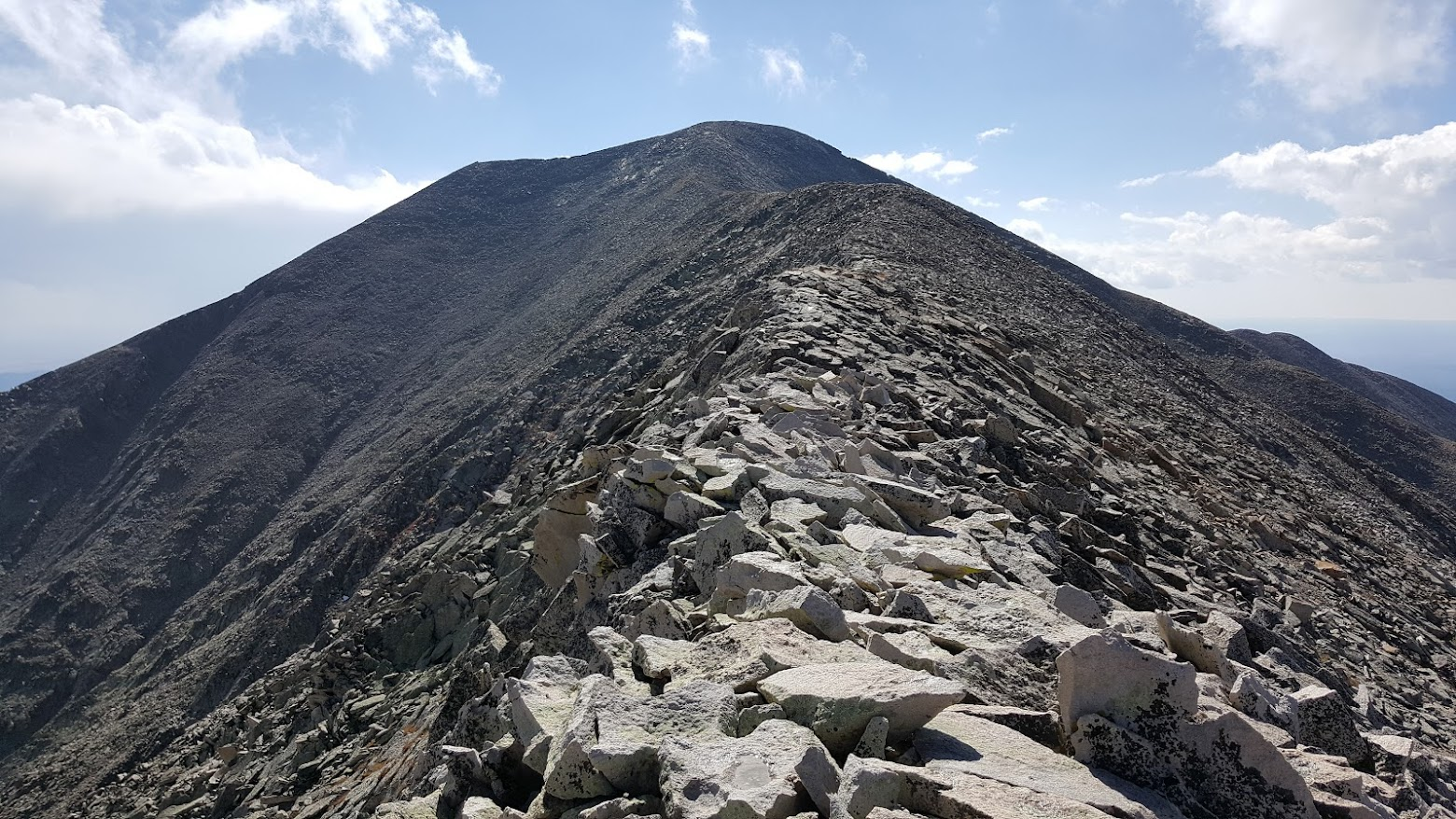
Ridge Leading to Summit of East Spanish Peak

== See also ==
- List of Colorado mountain ranges
- List of Colorado mountain summits
  - List of Colorado fourteeners
  - List of Colorado 4000 meter prominent summits
  - List of the most prominent summits of Colorado
- List of Colorado county high points
