= Spanish Peaks =

Pair of mountains in Colorado, United States

- Huajatolla
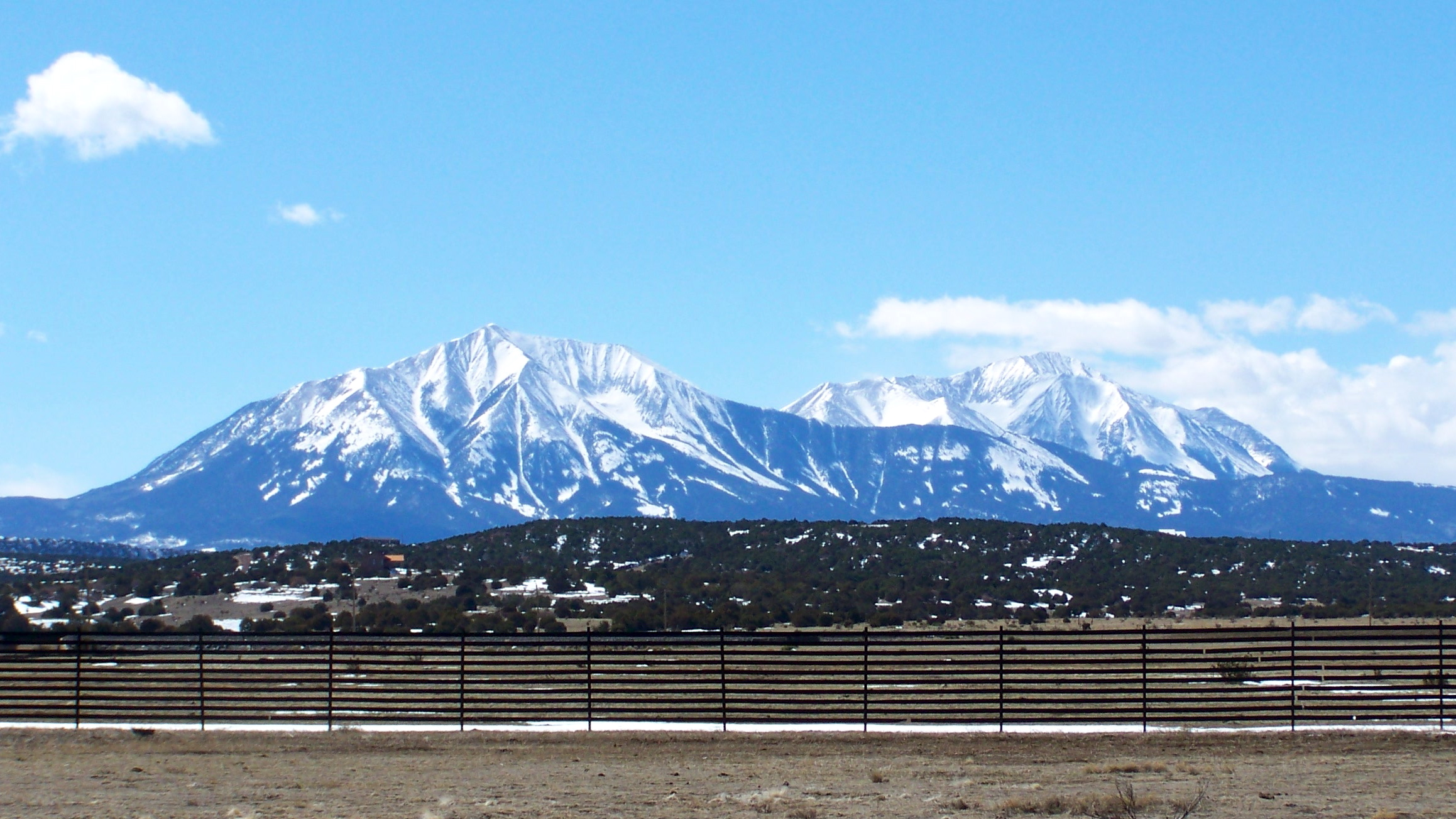

Highest point
- Peak: West Spanish Peak
- Elevation: 13,631 ft (4,155 m) NAVD 88
- Prominence: 3,666 ft (1,117 m)
- Coordinates: 37°22′32″N 104°59′36″W

Dimensions
- Area: 28 mi^{2} (73 km^{2})

Geography
- Location within Colorado
- Location: Huerfano County, Colorado
- Range coordinates: 37.38°N 104.95°W

U.S. National Natural Landmark
- Designated: 1976

The Spanish Peaks are a pair of prominent mountains located in southwestern Huerfano County, Colorado. The Comanche people call them Huajatolla (/wɑːhɑːˈtɔɪə/ wah-hah-TOY-ə) or Wa-ha-toy-yah meaning "double mountain"

The two peaks, East Spanish Peak at elevation 12,688 feet (3,867 m) and West Spanish Peak at elevation 13,631 feet (4,155 m), are east of, and separate from, the Culebra Range of the Sangre de Cristo Mountains. Both of the Spanish Peaks are higher than any point in the United States farther east. The Spanish Peaks are situated 100 miles (160 km) due south of Colorado Springs.

The Spanish Peaks were formed by two separate shallow (or hypabyssal) igneous intrusions during the Late-Oligocene epoch of the Paleogene Period. West Spanish Peak is an older (24.59 ± 0.13 Ma) quartz syenite. East Spanish Peak (23.36 ± 0.18 Ma) is composed of a granodiorite porphyry surrounded by a more aerially-extensive exposure of granite porphyry. The granite porphyry represents the evolved upper portion of the magma chamber while the interior granodiorite porphyry is exposed by erosion at the summit.

The Spanish Peaks were designated a National Natural Landmark in 1976 as two of the best known examples of igneous dikes.

They were an important landmark on the Santa Fe Trail, the first sighting of the Rocky Mountains for travelers on the trail. The mountains can be seen as far north as Colorado Springs (102 miles [164 km]), points south to Raton, New Mexico (65 miles [105 km]), and points on the Great Plains east of Trinidad (up to 100 miles [160 km]). A classic book about travel to the region in the 1840s is Wah-to-yah and the Taos Trail, by Lewis Garrard.

The Spanish Peaks Wilderness area of 17,855 acres (28 sq mi; 72 km^{2}) encompasses the summits of both Spanish peaks. Hiking is popular in the wilderness area.

== See also ==
- Breast shaped hills
