= West Spanish Peak =

Mountain in Colorado, United States

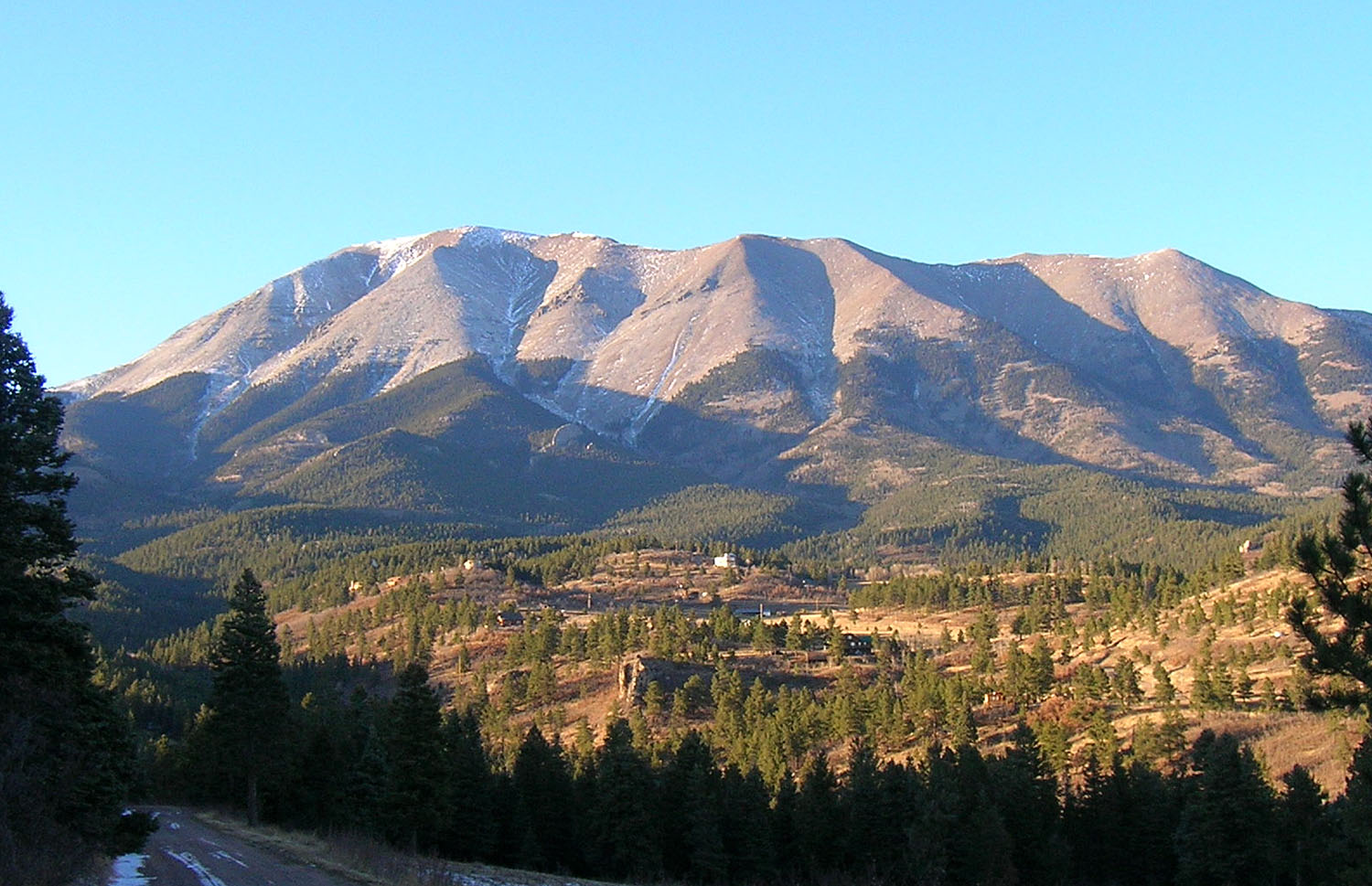
- West Spanish Peak from the south

Highest point
- Elevation: 13,631 ft (4,155 m)
- Prominence: 3,686 ft (1,123 m)
- Isolation: 20.49 mi (32.98 km)
- Listing: North America highest peaks 87th; US highest major peaks 70th; Colorado highest major peaks 35th; Colorado county high points 23rd
- Coordinates: 37°22′32″N 104°59′37″W

Geography
- Location within Colorado
- Location: Huerfano County and the high point of Las Animas County, Colorado, United States
- Parent range: Culebra Range, Highest summit of the Spanish Peaks
- Topo map(s): USGS 7.5' topographic map Spanish Peaks, Colorado

Climbing
- Easiest route: West Ridge: hike/scramble, class 2

West Spanish Peak is a high and prominent mountain summit that is the higher of the two Spanish Peaks in the Rocky Mountains of North America. The prominent 13,631-foot (4,155 m) peak is located in the Spanish Peaks Wilderness of San Isabel National Forest, 9.1 miles (14.7 km) south (bearing 175°) of the Town of La Veta, Colorado, United States, on the drainage divide between Huerfano and Las Animas counties. The summit of West Spanish Peak is the highest point in Las Animas County, Colorado.

The Spanish Peaks are two large igneous stocks which form an eastern outlier of the Culebra Range, a subrange of the Sangre de Cristo Mountains. West Spanish Peak is the easternmost 4,000 meters (13,000 feet) mountain peak in the United States. Due to its position well east of the Culebra Range and on the edge of the eastern plains of Colorado, West Spanish Peak enjoys great local vertical relief in almost all directions. For example, it rises over 6,000 ft (1,800 m) in less than 6.5 miles (10.5 km) on both its north and south flanks. Though not a fourteener, West Spanish Peak is the twelfth most topographically prominent peak in the state.

== Geology ==
West Spanish Peak is an erosional remnant of a predominantly quartz syenite igneous stock which formed 24.59 +/-0.13 million years ago. It is the focus of over 500 radiating dikes.

== Hiking/climbing ==
The standard ascent route for West Spanish Peak starts at Cordova Pass, a high pass (11,248 ft; 3,428 m) to the west of the peak. It follows a trail for about 2 miles (3.2 km) to treeline. From there, there's a rough path on talus (scree) up the southwest ridge of the peak for an additional 1.5 miles (2.4 km). The trail is very braided and has a tendency to "go to the right" (which is into loose scree). If climbers stay to the left and close to the ridge, the climbing is much easier. At about 13,000 feet (4,000 m) is a large shale buttress to the right that usually has a small pool of warm water at its foot. Once up on the main part of the top ridge, it's an easy hike to the actual summit. The top ridge tends to be 30–100 feet (9.1–30.5 meters) wide and is about 0.5 miles (0.80 km) long before beginning a significant downward trend on the east side of the mountain. To the north and south are very steep descents. At the summit is a large rock cairn with the usual PVC tube and "sign-in" sheet inside. This mountain is very unsafe when there is snow on the ground. Best time to climb: early June through late October. Thunderstorm and lightning activity can be high in July, August and September.

== Gallery ==
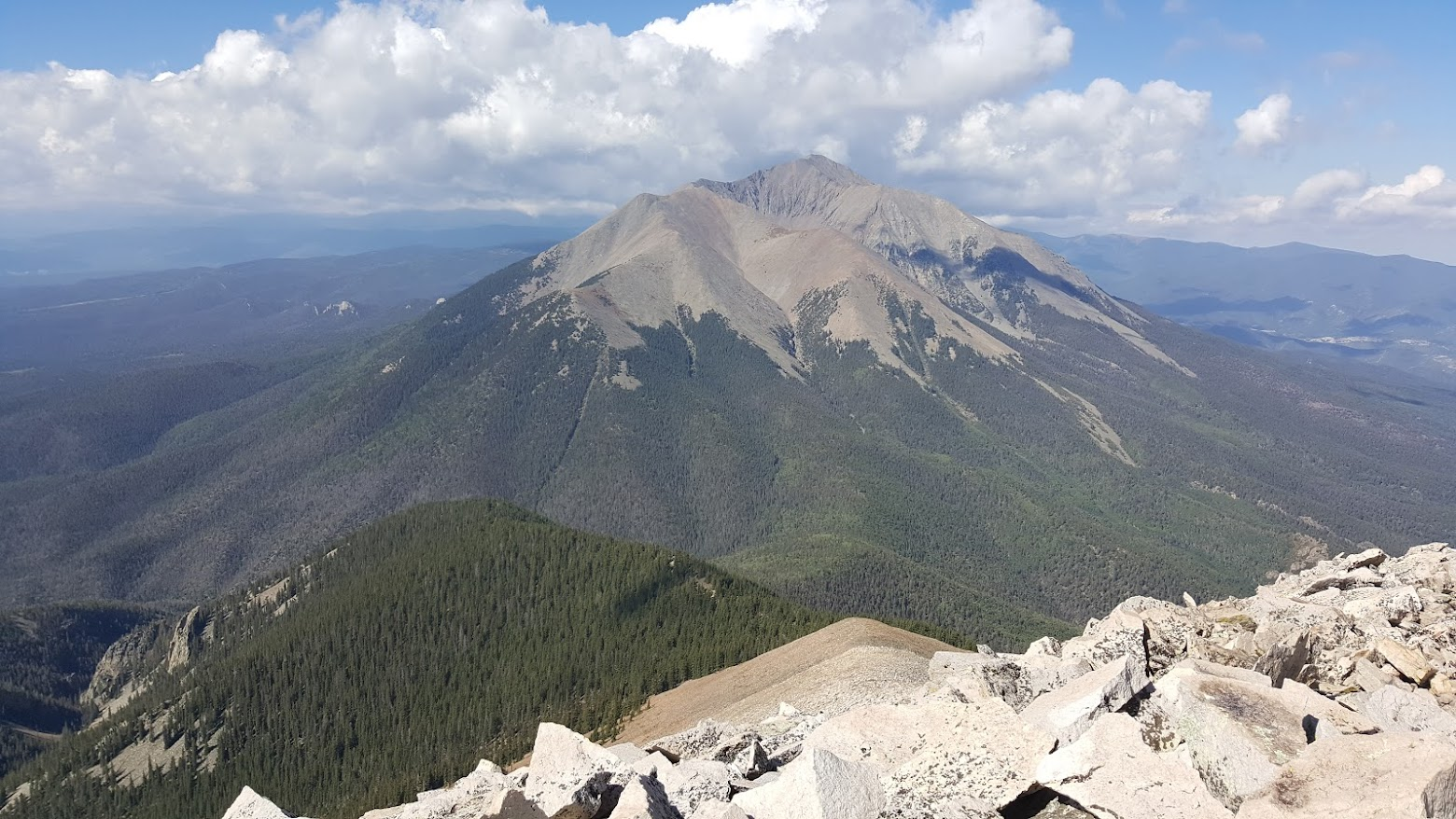
West Spanish Peak Seen From East Spanish Peak.

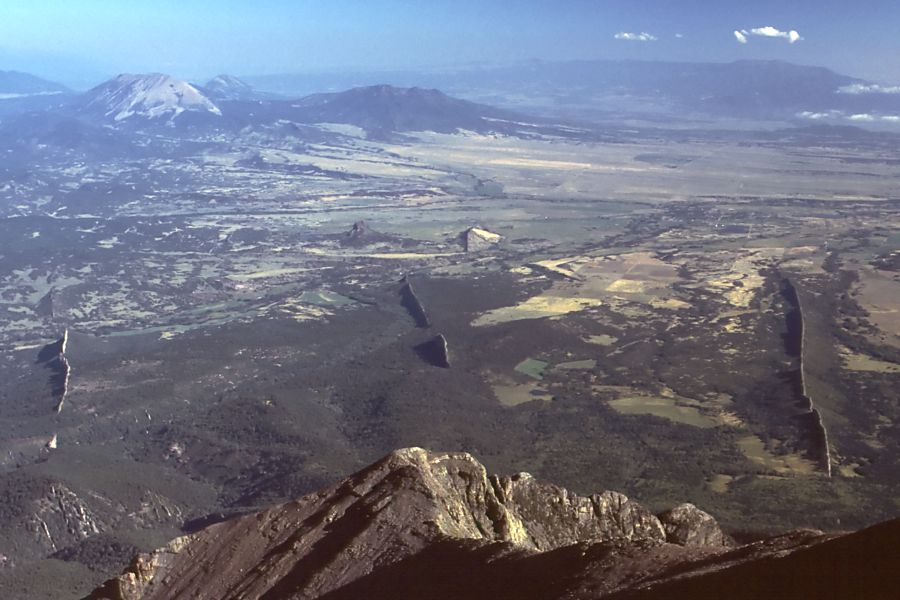
Igneous dikes, looking north from West Spanish Peak.

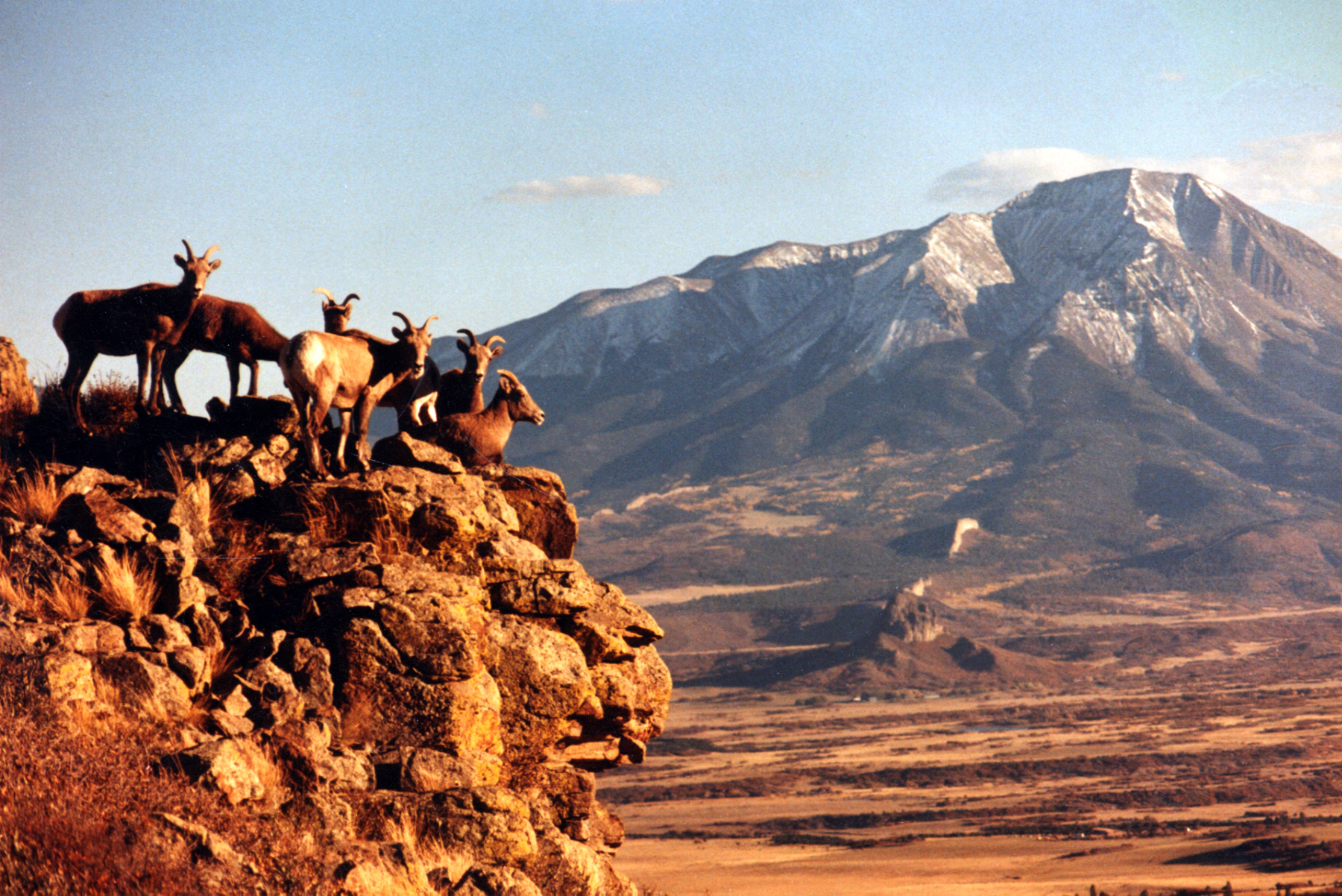
Sunset shot of some Bighorn sheep ewes with the West Spanish Peak in the background.

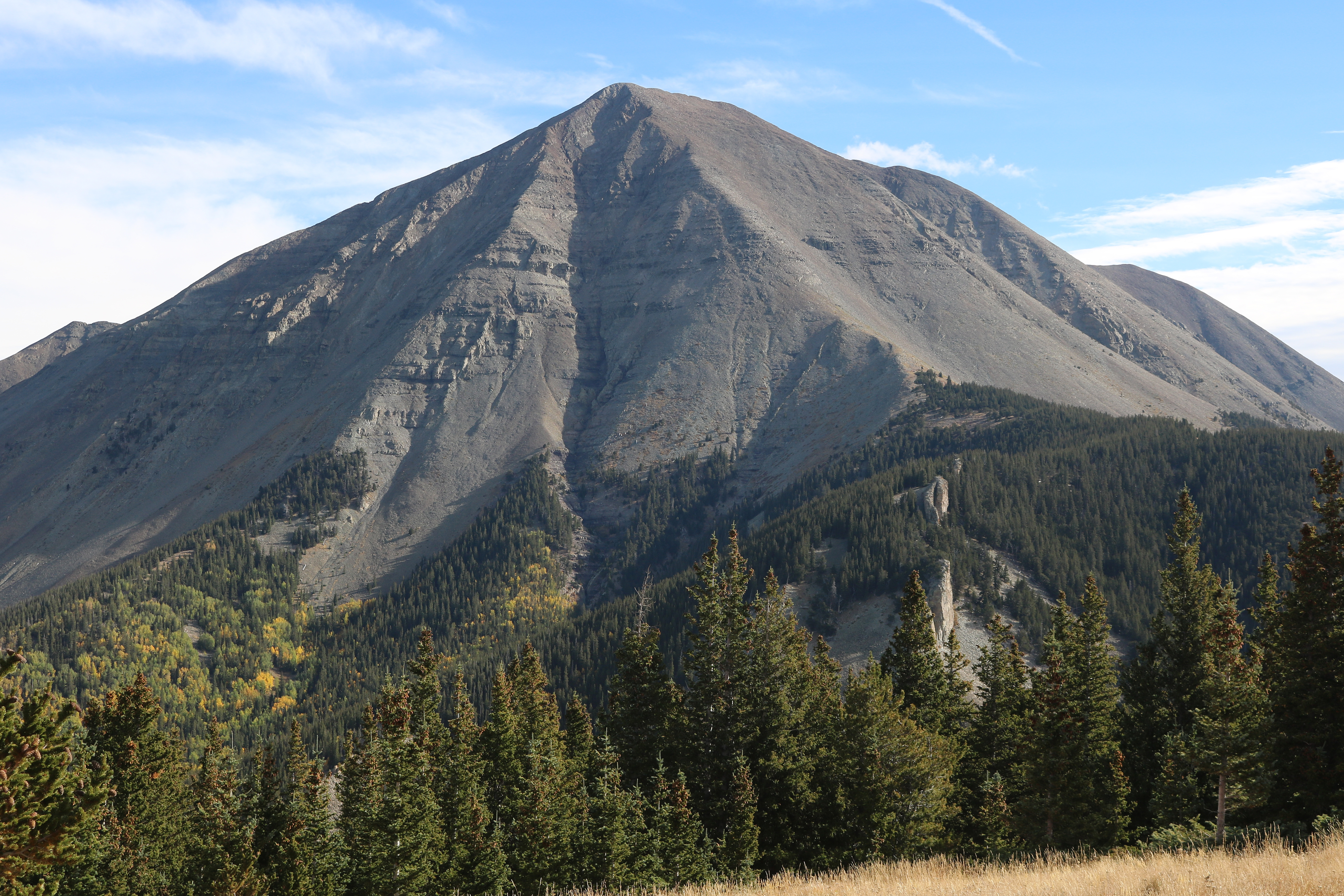
West Spanish Peak viewed from near Cordova Pass.

== See also ==
- List of mountain peaks of North America
  - List of mountain peaks of the United States
    - List of mountain peaks of Colorado
      - List of Colorado county high points
