= Spanish Peaks Wilderness =

Wilderness area in Colorado, United States

- IUCN category Ib (wilderness area)
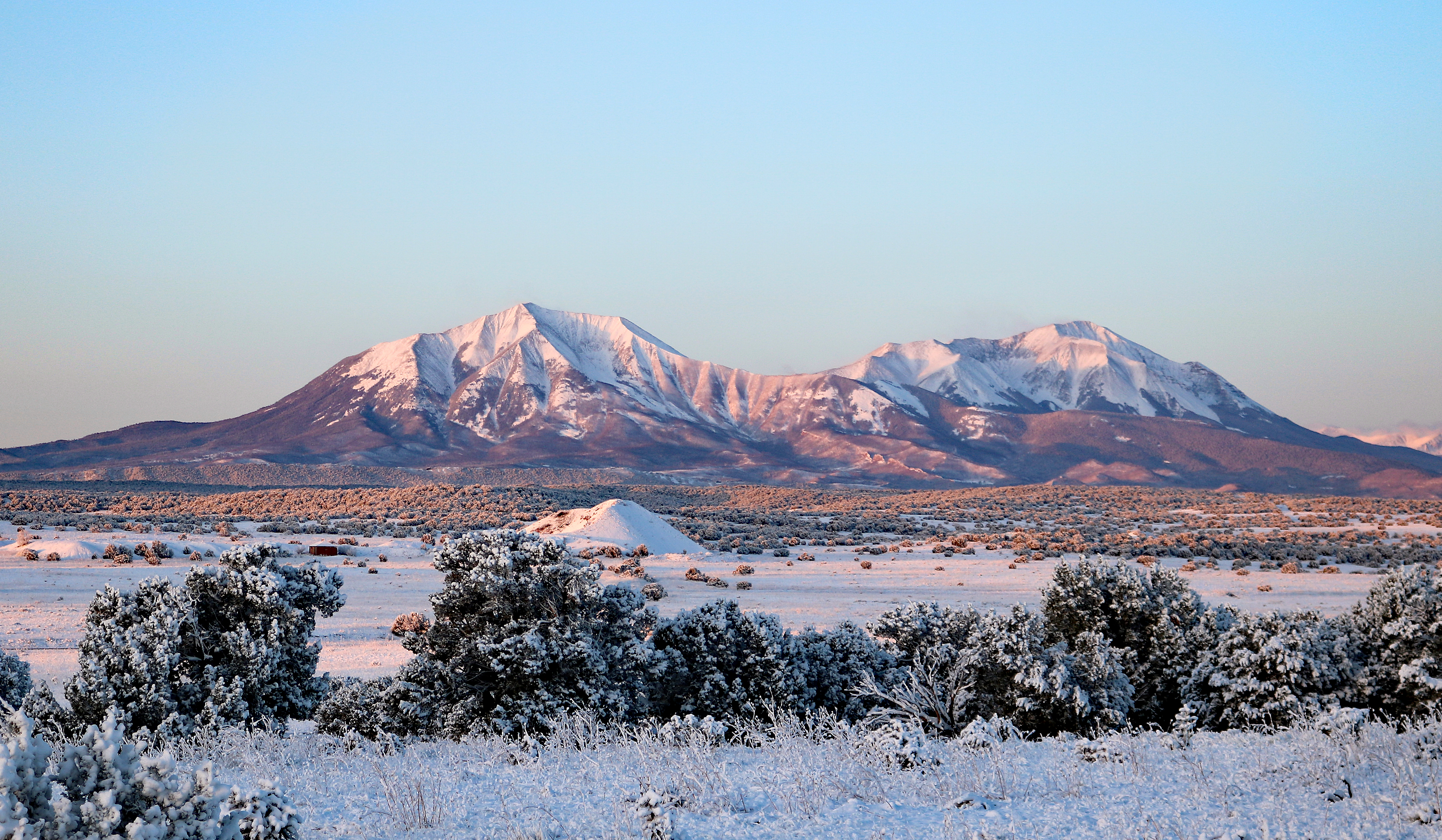
- The Wilderness encompasses the two Spanish Peaks.

- Location within the United States
- Location: Huerfano / Las Animas counties, Colorado, United States
- Nearest city: Walsenburg
- Coordinates: 37°22′57″N 104°58′43″W
- Area: 19,226 acres (77.80 km^{2})
- Established: January 1, 2000
- Governing body: U.S. Forest Service

The Spanish Peaks Wilderness is a 19,226 acres (77.80 km^{2}) wilderness area in Huerfano County and Las Animas County, Colorado, United States, located 20 miles (32 km) southwest of Walsenburg. All of the wilderness area is located within San Isabel National Forest, which is managed by the U.S. Forest Service.

== Geography ==
The Spanish Peaks (Spanish: Las Cumbres Españolas) are prominent landmarks along the eastern front of the southern Rockies. Their snow-capped summits of the East Spanish Peak and the West Spanish Peak, rise 7,000 feet (2,100 m) above the arid plains, made the "Double Mountain" an easily recognizable reference point to travelers of all cultures. The West Spanish Peak with an elevation of 13,623 feet (4,152 m), overtops the East Spanish Peak which only has an elevation of 12,708 feet (3,873 m). However, this difference is not readily discernible from a distance.

== History ==
The Peaks have traditional and religious significance to American Indian tribes including the Apache, Comanche, and Ute. The common Indian name appears in at least three different spellings in various accounts, reflecting different renditions of oral expression. These are "Wahatoya", Huajatolla" or Guajatoyah". This is widely reported to be a Ute name meaning "breasts of the earth", but is in fact a Comanche name translating to "double mountain".

== Geology ==
The Spanish Peaks are geologically distinct from the faulted and uplifted mountains of the Sangre de Cristo range to the west. To the geologist the Spanish Peaks are prime examples of "stocks" which are defined as large masses of igneous (molten) rock which intruded layers of sedimentary rock and were later exposed by erosion. When mapped by geologists the Peaks were found to be masses of granite, granodiorite, and syenodiorite.

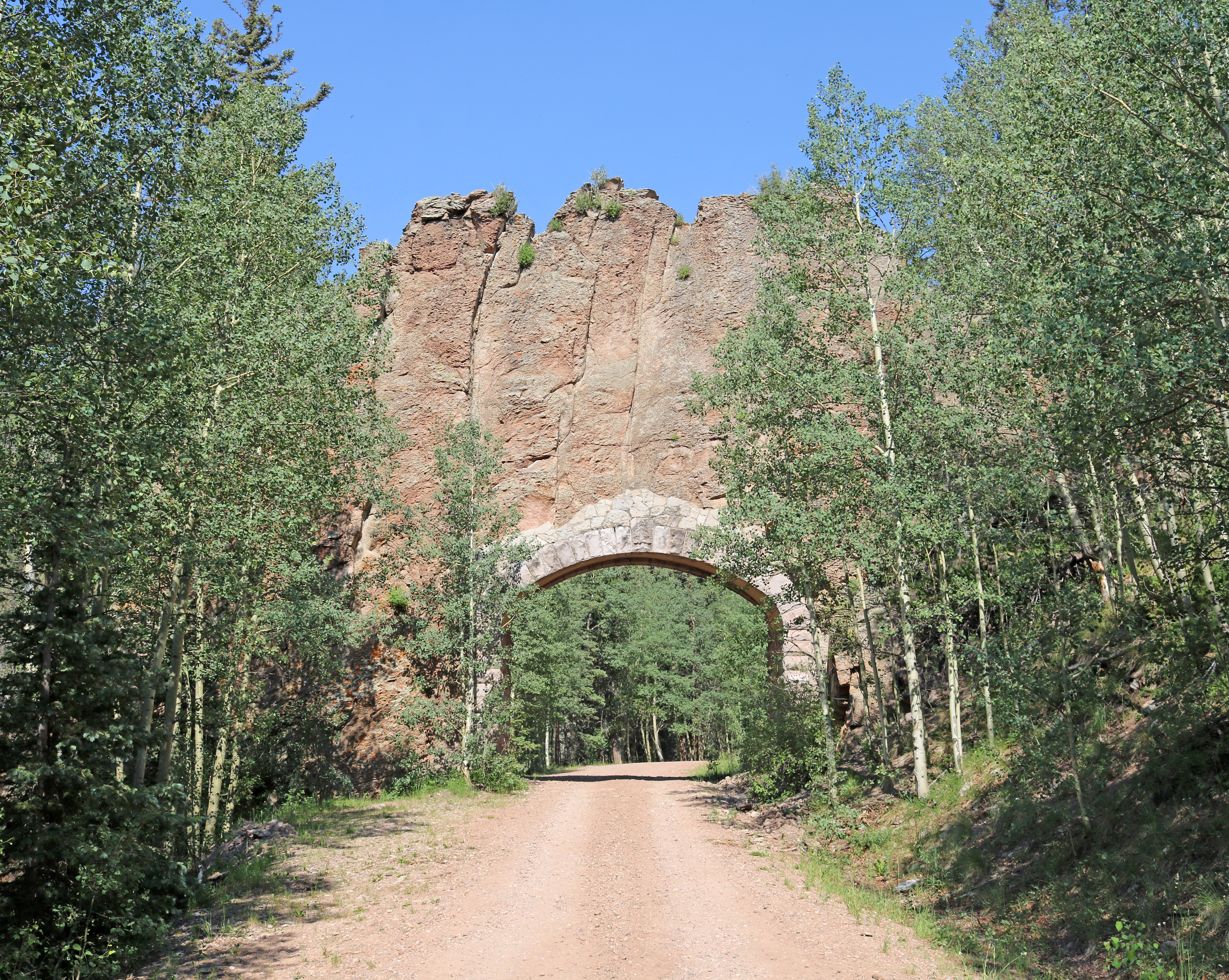
The Apishapa Arch.

Among the most unusual features of the Spanish Peaks are the great dikes which radiate out from the mountains like spokes of a wheel. These walls of rock are often spectacular. They are easily visible from the highway north of the peaks (and west of Walsenburg), and pictures of them have been used as type examples in more than one introductory geology textbook. Several can be easily seen up close on back dirt roads, and one (Apishapa Arch) on the south side of the peaks can actually be driven through.
