= List of federal scenic byways in Colorado =

Coordinates: 38.9972°N 105.5478°W

Federal scenic byways in Colorado
- Federal scenic byway route signs

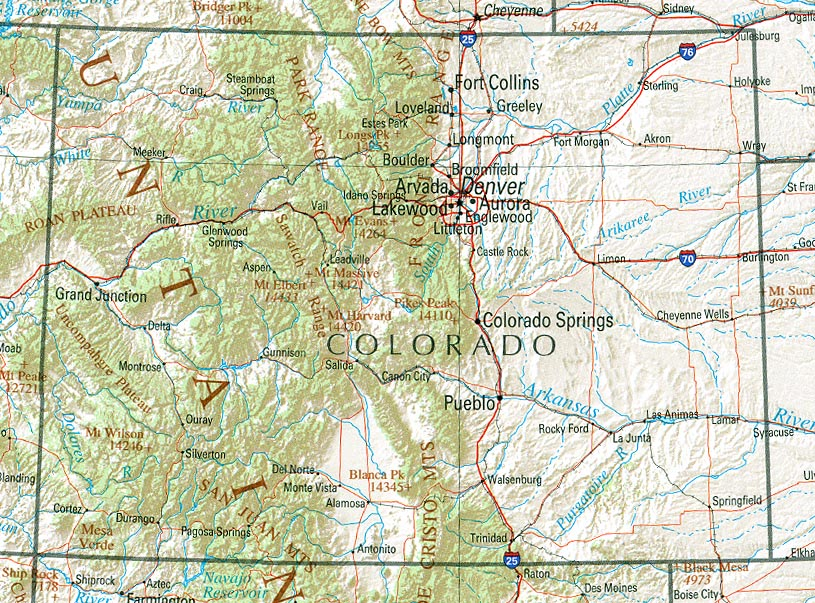

Highway names
- Interstates: Interstate nn (I-nn)
- US Highways: U.S. Highway nn (US nn)
- State: State Highway nn (SH nn)
- County: County Road nn (CR nn)
- Forest: Forest Road nnn (FR nnn)

System links
- Scenic Byways; National; National Forest; BLM; NPS

This is a list of the 21 federally designated scenic byways in the US state of Colorado. Three federal agencies designate four types of scenic byways. The 21 scenic byways in Colorado include:

- 2 All-American Roads designated by the Federal Highway Administration;
- 11 National Scenic Byways designated by the Federal Highway Administration;
- 10 National Forest Scenic Byways designated by the United States Forest Service;
- 3 Back Country Byways designated by the Bureau of Land Management

Five of these scenic byways have double federal designations. The 13 combined All-American Roads and National Scenic Byways in Colorado are currently the most of any state. All 21 federal scenic byways are among the 26 Colorado Scenic and Historic Byways.

== List of All-American Roads in Colorado ==

There are currently two All-American Roads in Colorado with 284 miles (457 km) of roadway.

1. San Juan Skyway Scenic and Historic Byway 236 miles (380 km)
2. Trail Ridge Road/Beaver Meadow Scenic Byway (Note: The Trail Ridge Road/Beaver Meadow National Scenic Byway on U.S. Route 34 is the highest continuous paved highway in North America with its high point at 12,183 feet (3,713 m) elevation near Fall River Pass.) 48 miles (77 km)

== List of National Scenic Byways in Colorado ==

There are currently 11 National Scenic Byways in Colorado with 1,169 miles (1,881 km) of roadway. Two adjacent National Scenic Byways in New Mexico have 1,043 miles (1,679 km) of roadway. Two adjacent National Scenic Byways in Utah have 694 miles (1,117 km) of roadway. Two adjacent National Scenic Byways in Arizona have 126 miles (203 km) of roadway.

1. Colorado River Headwaters Scenic Byway 80 miles (130 km)
2. Dinosaur Diamond Scenic Byway 134 miles (216 km) plus 328 miles (528 km) in Utah
3. Frontier Pathways Scenic and Historic Byway 103 miles (166 km)
4. Gold Belt Tour Scenic and Historic Byway 131 miles (211 km)
5. Grand Mesa Scenic Byway 63 miles (101 km)
6. Highway of Legends Scenic Byway 82 miles (132 km)
7. Lariat Loop Scenic and Historic Byway 40 miles (64 km)
8. Santa Fe Trail Scenic and Historic Byway 188 miles (303 km) plus 381 miles (613 km) in New Mexico
9. Silver Thread Scenic and Historic Byway 117 miles (188 km)
10. Top of the Rockies Scenic Byway 115 miles (185 km)
11. Trail of the Ancients Scenic and Historic Byway 116 miles (187 km) plus 366 miles (589 km) in Utah, 126.3 miles (203 km) in Arizona, and 662.4 miles (1,066 km) in New Mexico

== List of National Forest Scenic Byways in Colorado ==

There are currently ten National Forest Scenic Byways in Colorado with 1,012 miles (1,629 km) of roadway.

1. Cache la Poudre-North Park Scenic Byway 101 miles (163 km)
2. Flat Tops Trail Scenic Byway 82 miles (132 km)
3. Grand Mesa Scenic Byway 63 miles (101 km)
4. Guanella Pass Scenic Byway 22 miles (35 km)
5. Highway of Legends Scenic Byway 82 miles (132 km)
6. Mount Blue Sky Scenic Byway (Note: The Mount Blue Sky Scenic Byway on Colorado State Highway 5 is the highest paved road in North America with its upper terminus at 14,140 feet (4,310 m) elevation near the summit of Mount Blue Sky at 14,267 feet (4,349 m) elevation.) 49 miles (79 km)
7. Peak to Peak Scenic Byway 55 miles (89 km)
8. San Juan Skyway Scenic and Historic Byway 236 miles (380 km)
9. Silver Thread Scenic and Historic Byway 117 miles (188 km)
10. West Elk Loop Scenic and Historic Byway 205 miles (330 km)

== List of Back Country Byways in Colorado ==

There are currently three Back Country Byways in Colorado with 323 miles (520 km) of roadway.

1. Alpine Loop Back Country Byway 63 miles (101 km)
2. Gold Belt Tour Scenic and Historic Byway 131 miles (211 km)
3. Los Caminos Antiguos Scenic and Historic Byway 129 miles (208 km)

== List of state scenic byways with multiple federal designations ==

Five Colorado Scenic and Historic Byways currently have two federal designations.

The following Colorado Scenic and Historic Byway is both an All-American Road and a National Forest Scenic Byway:

- San Juan Skyway Scenic and Historic Byway 236 miles (380 km)

The following three Colorado Scenic and Historic Byways are both National Scenic Byways and National Forest Scenic Byways:

- Grand Mesa Scenic Byway 63 miles (101 km)
- Highway of Legends Scenic Byway 82 miles (132 km)
- Silver Thread Scenic and Historic Byway 117 miles (188 km)

The following Colorado Scenic and Historic Byway is both a National Scenic Byway and a Back Country Byway:

- Gold Belt Tour Scenic and Historic Byway 131 miles (211 km)

== Gallery ==
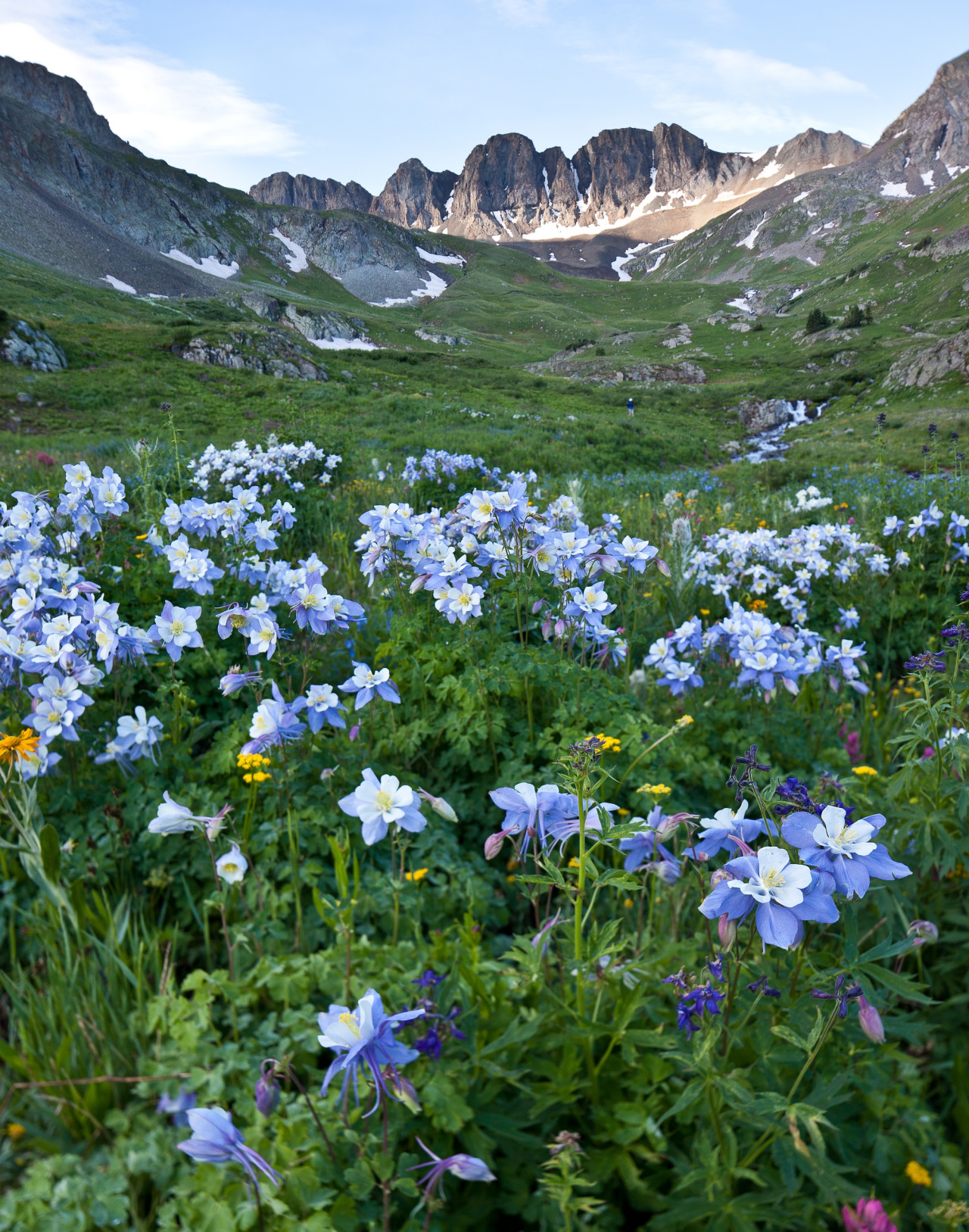
Colorado blue columbine along the Alpine Loop Back Country Byway

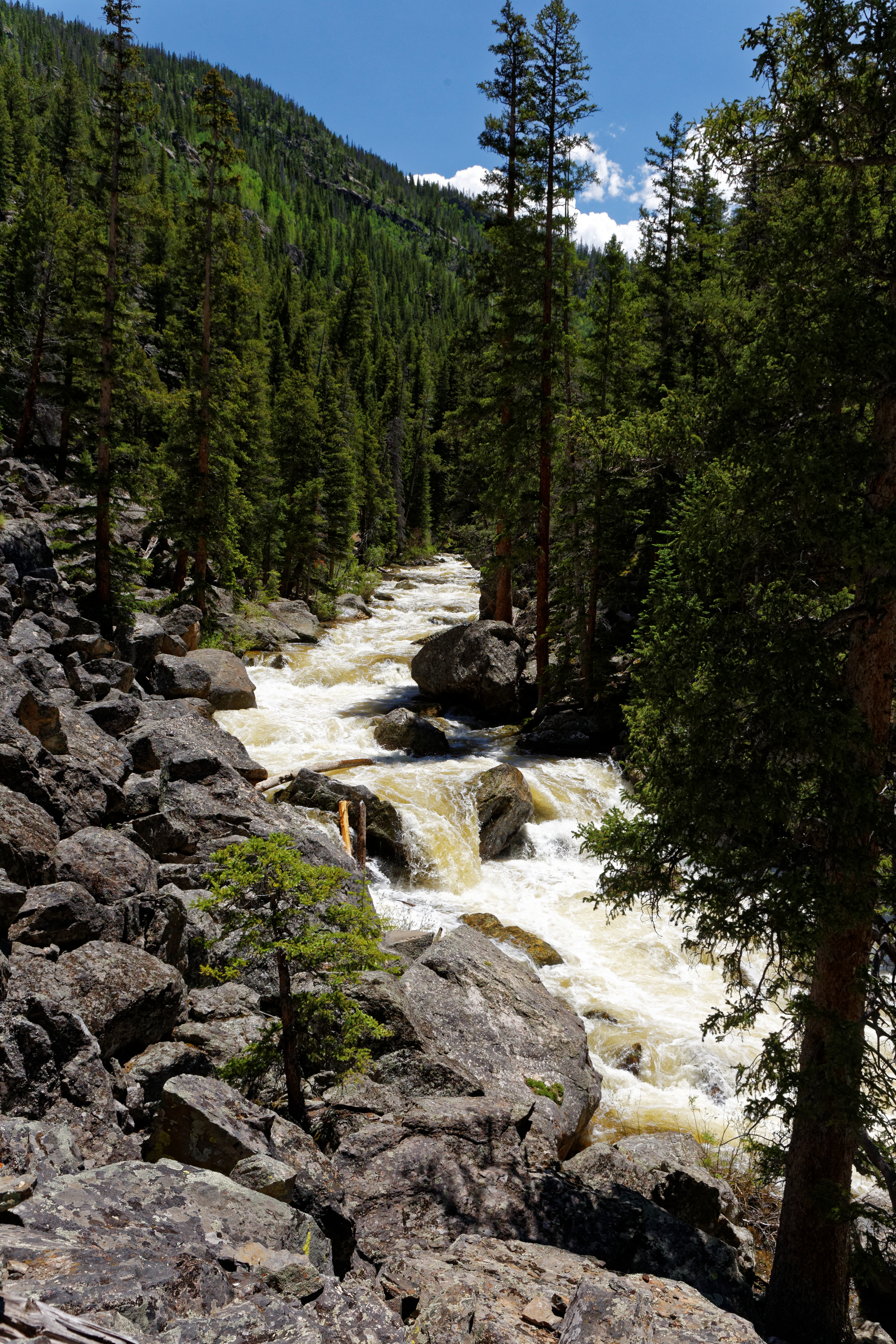
Poudre Canyon on the Cache la Poudre-North Park Scenic Byway

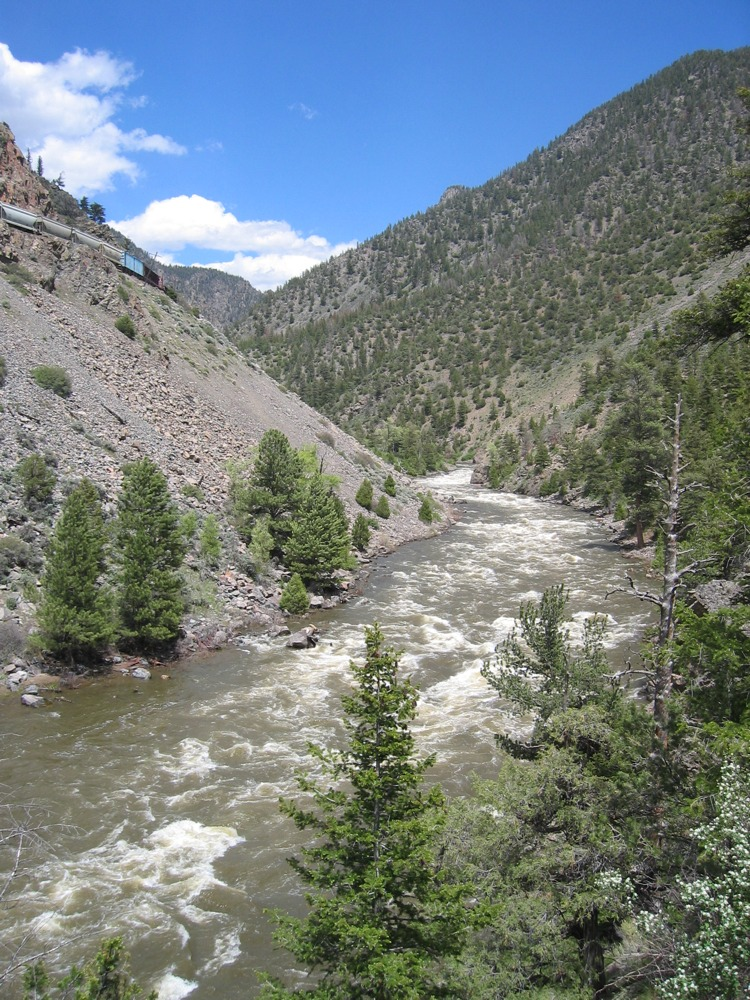
Gore Canyon on the Colorado River Headwaters Scenic Byway

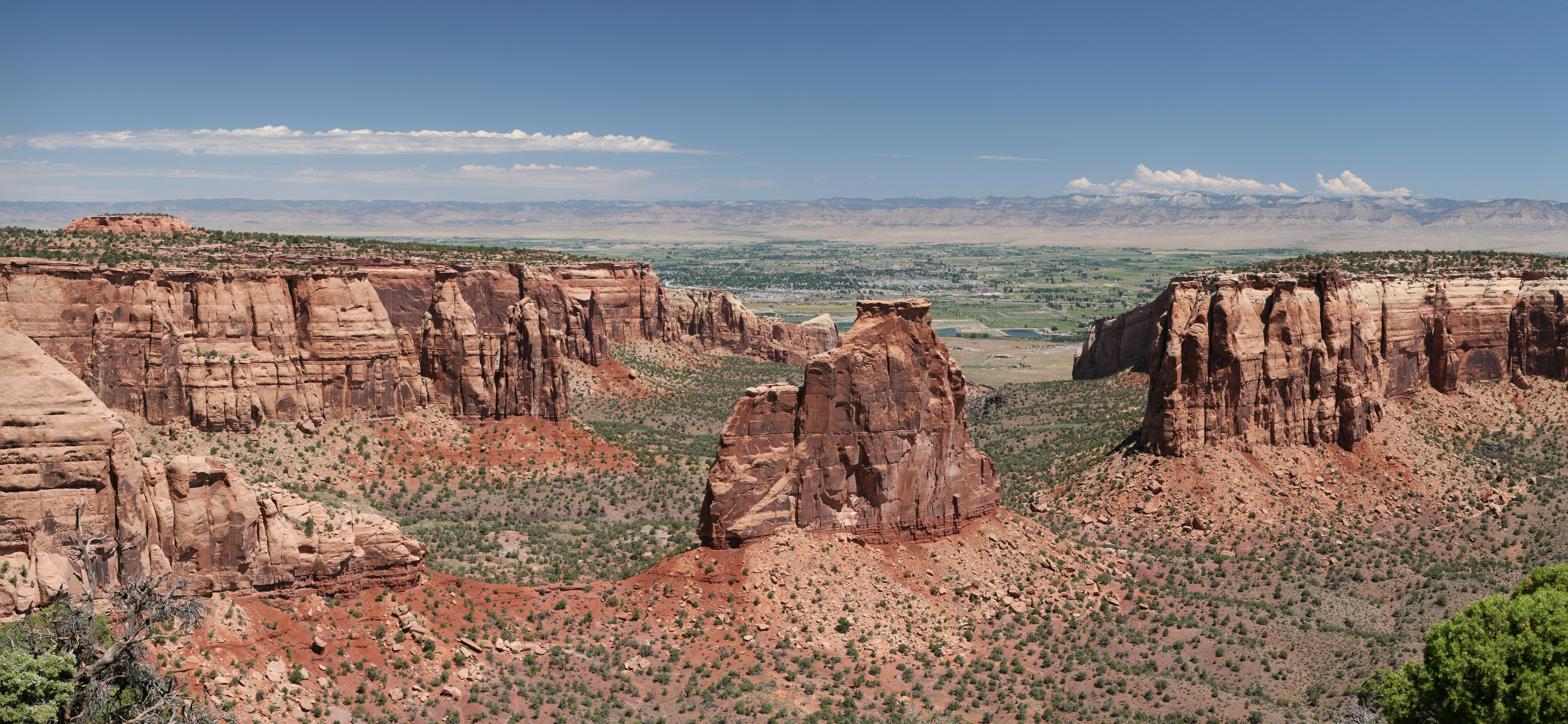
Colorado National Monument along the Dinosaur Diamond Scenic and Historic Byway

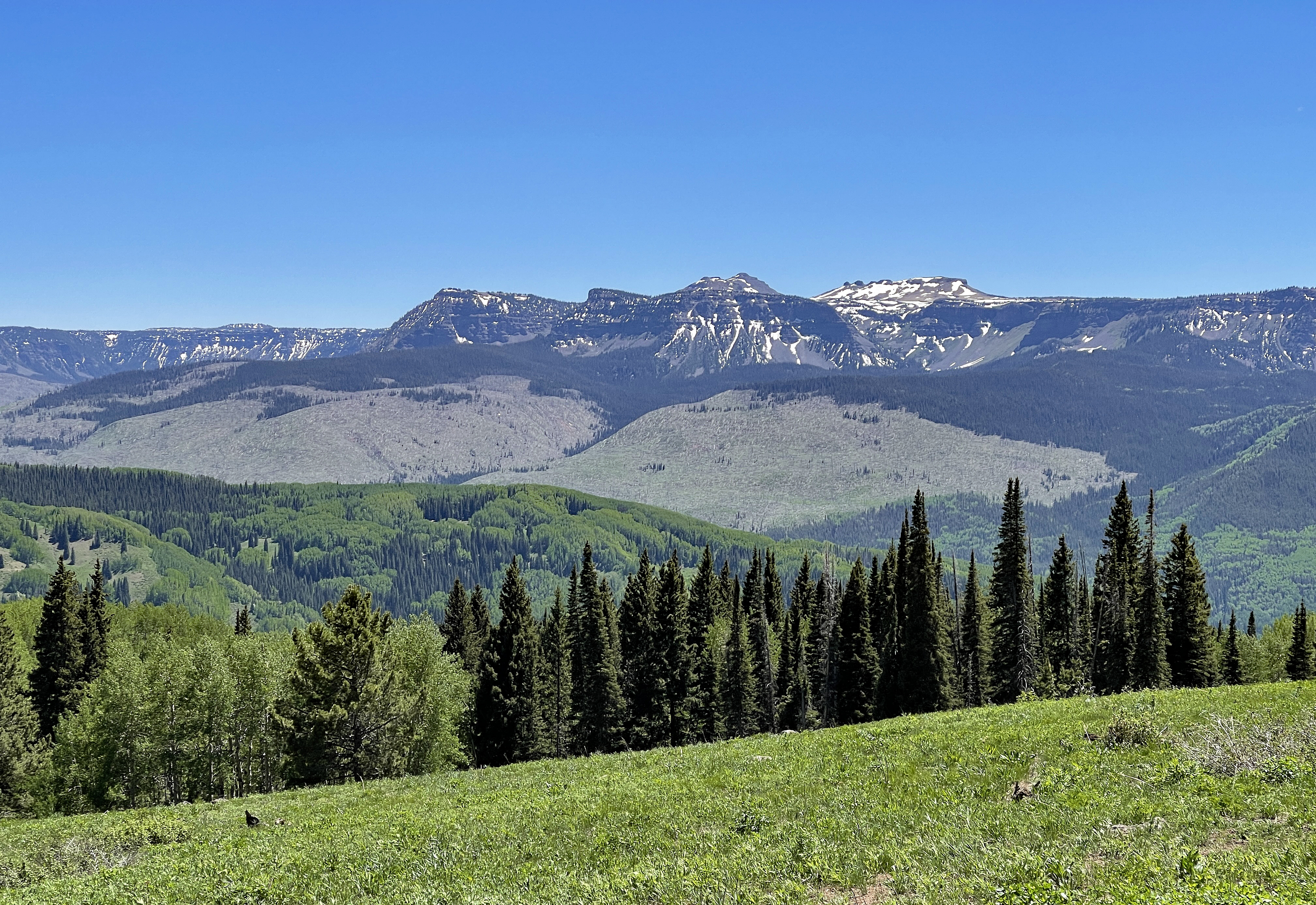
The Flat Tops Wilderness from the Flat Tops Trail Scenic Byway

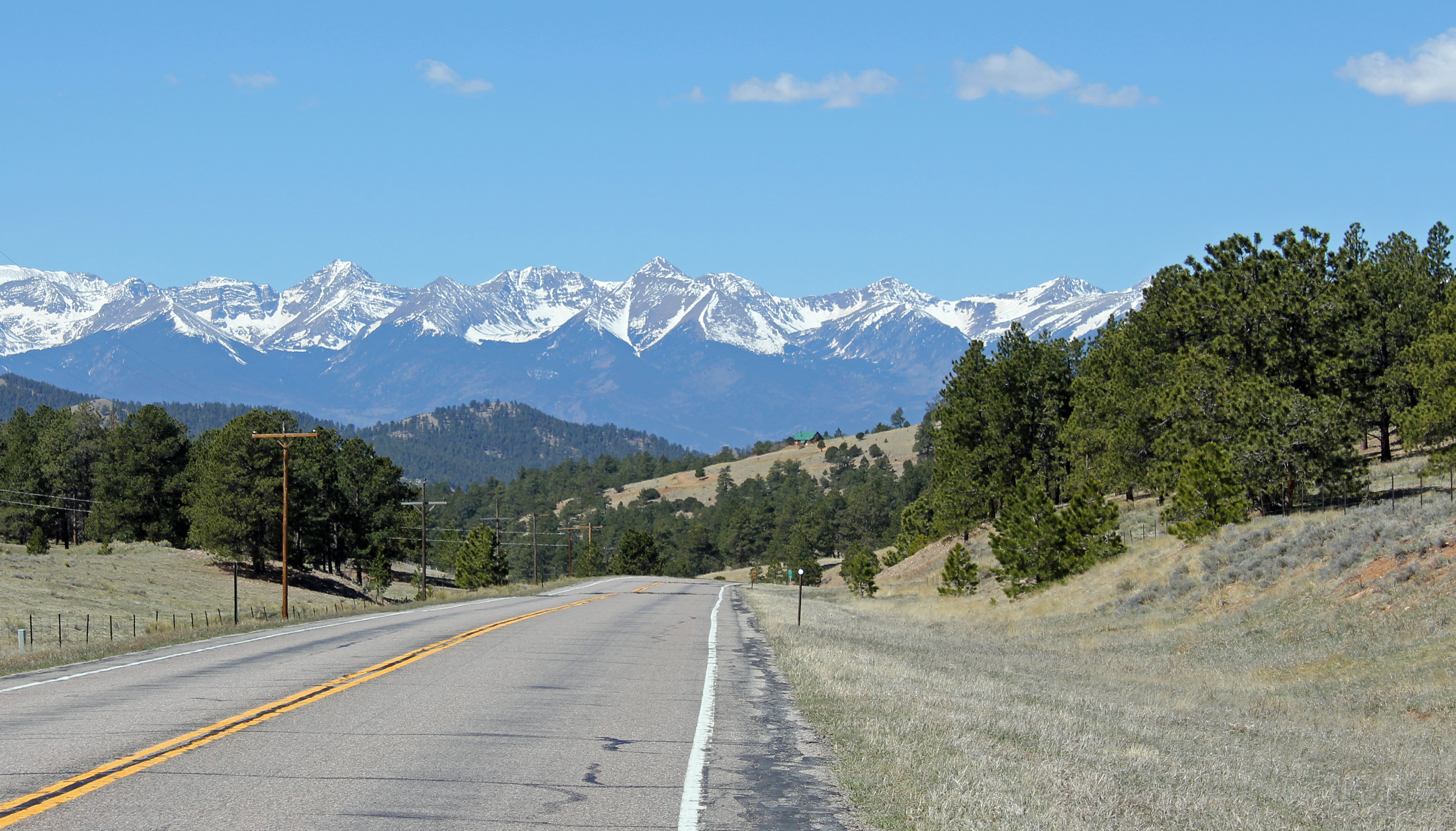
Hardscrabble Pass on the Frontier Pathways Scenic Byway

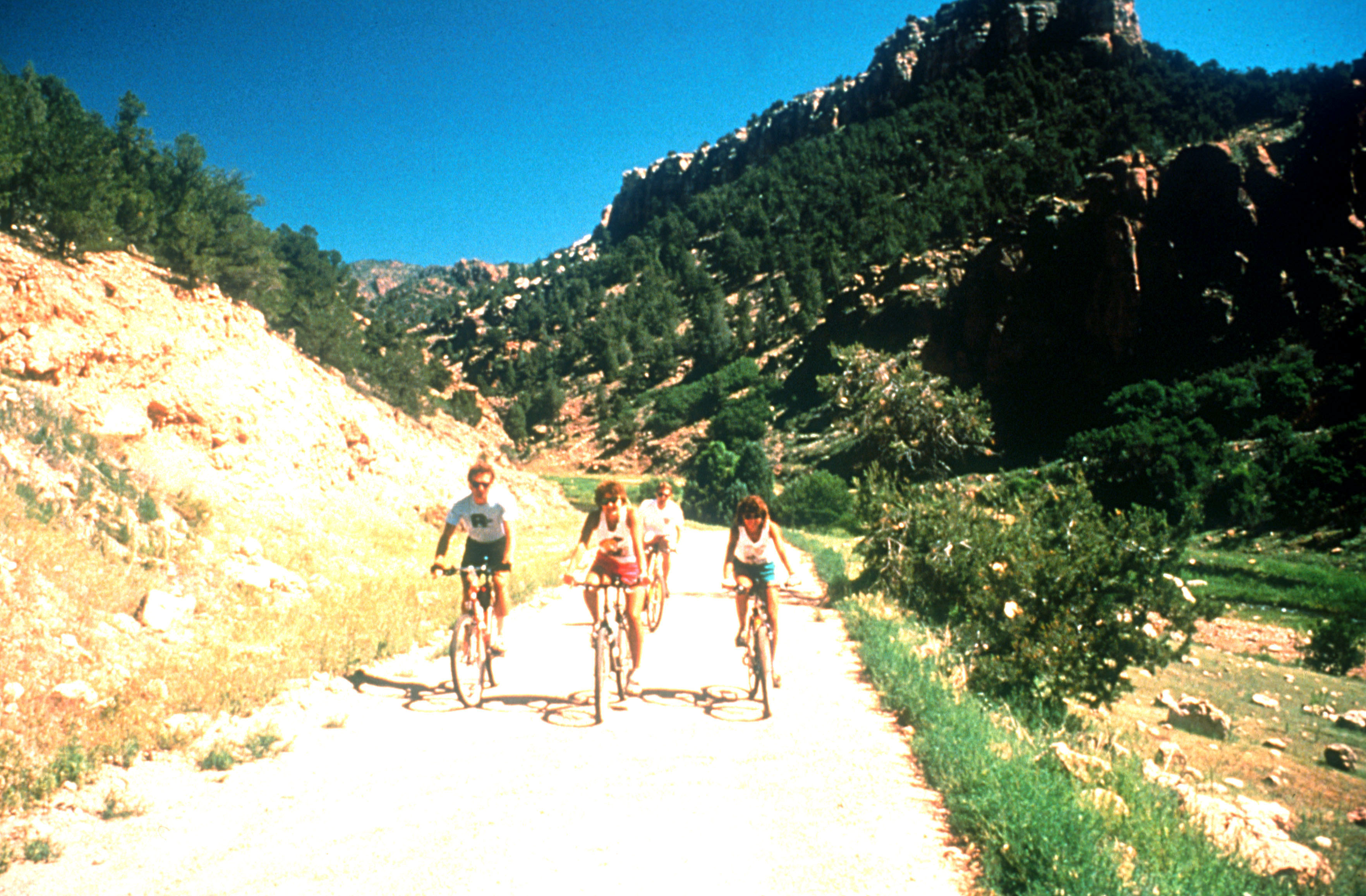
Bicycling on the Gold Belt Tour Scenic and Historic Byway

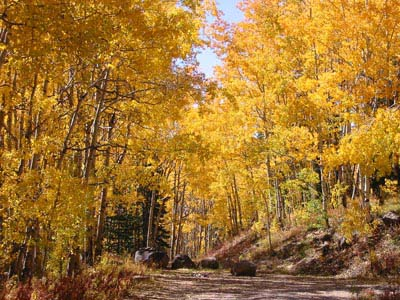
Autumn along the Grand Mesa Scenic Byway

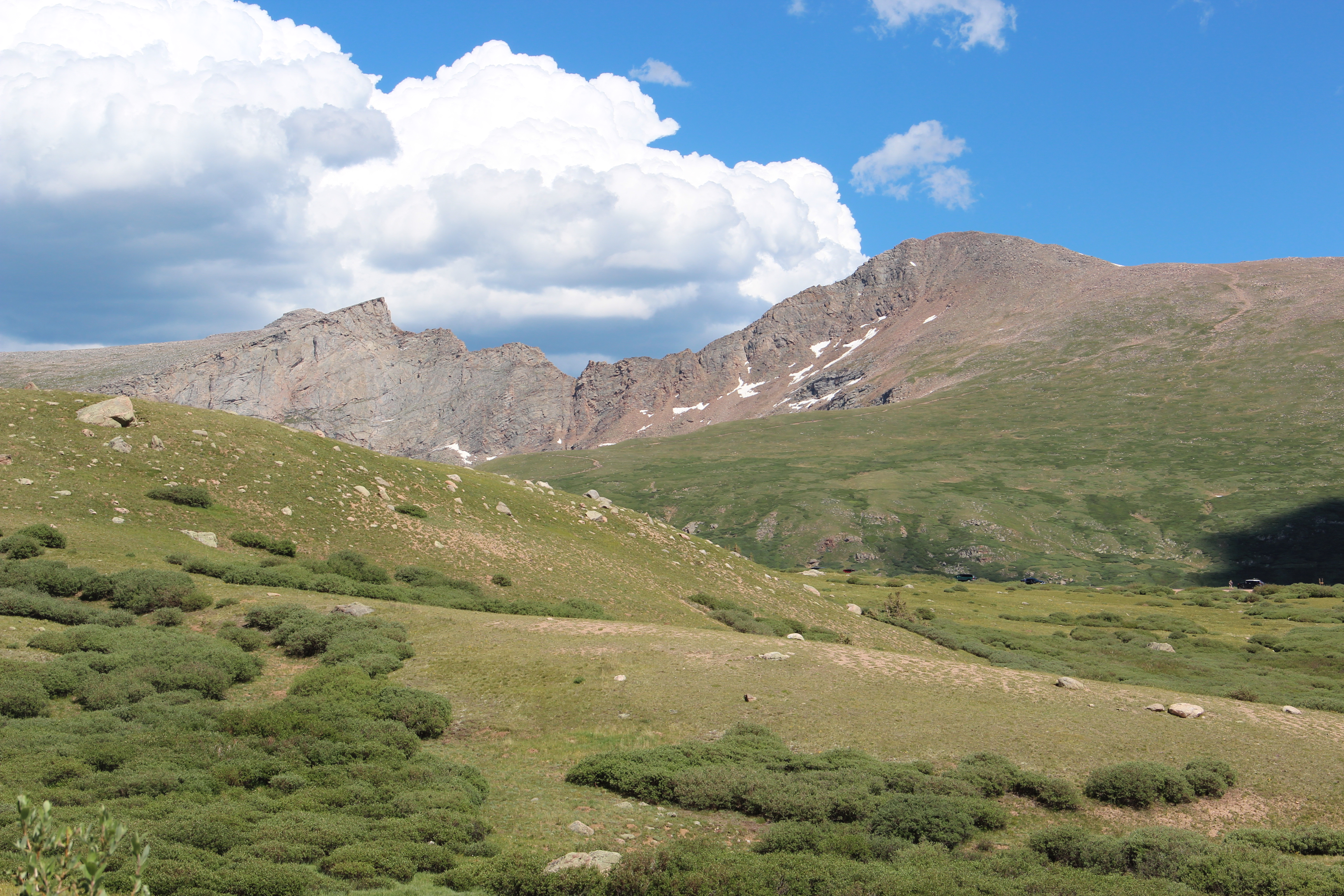
The Sawtooth and Mount Bierstadt from the Guanella Pass Scenic Byway

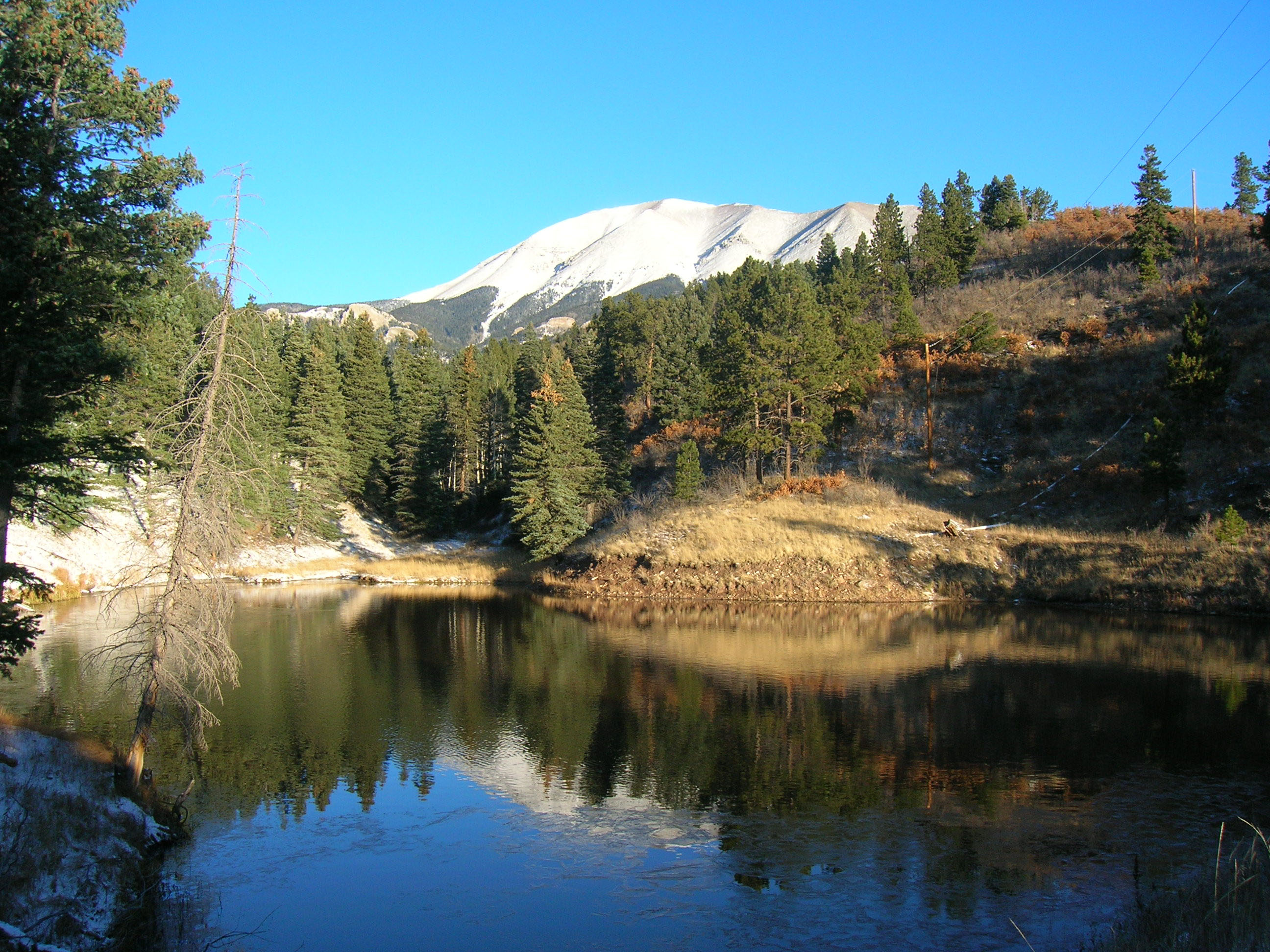
West Spanish Peak from the Highway of Legends Scenic Byway

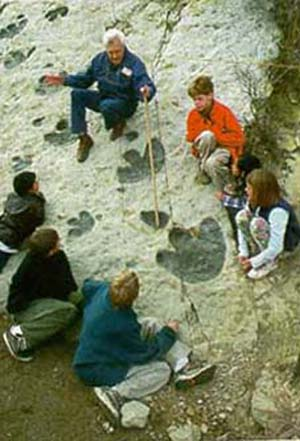
Dinosaur footprints along the Lariat Loop Scenic and Historic Byway

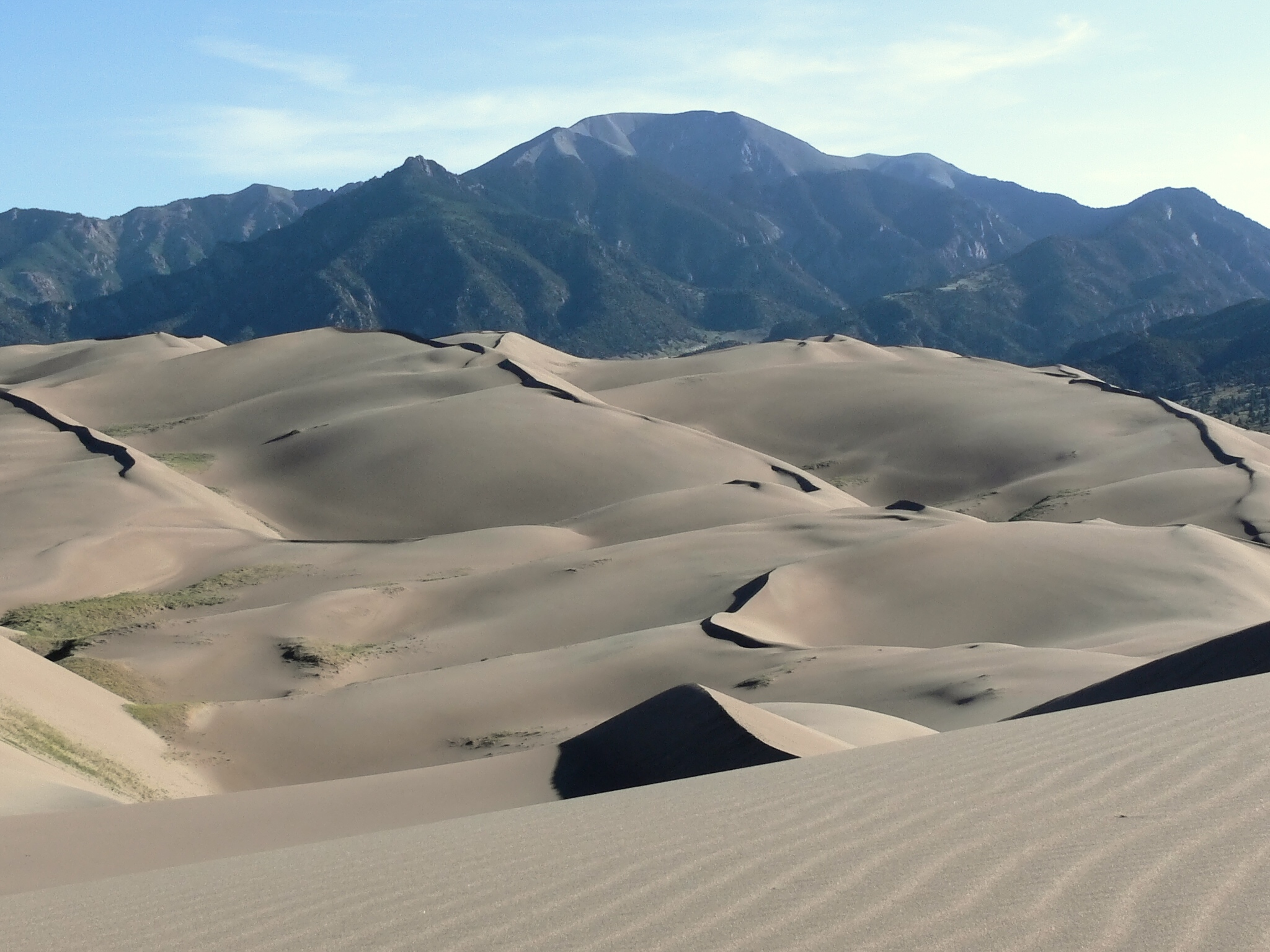
Great Sand Dunes National Park and Preserve along Los Caminos Antiguos Scenic and Historic Byway

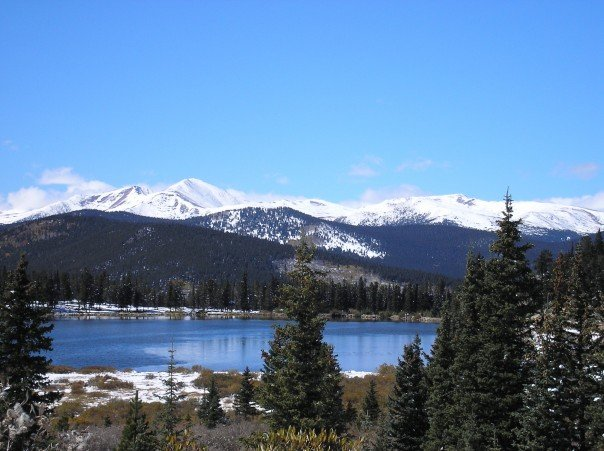
Echo Lake along the Mount Blue Sky Scenic Byway

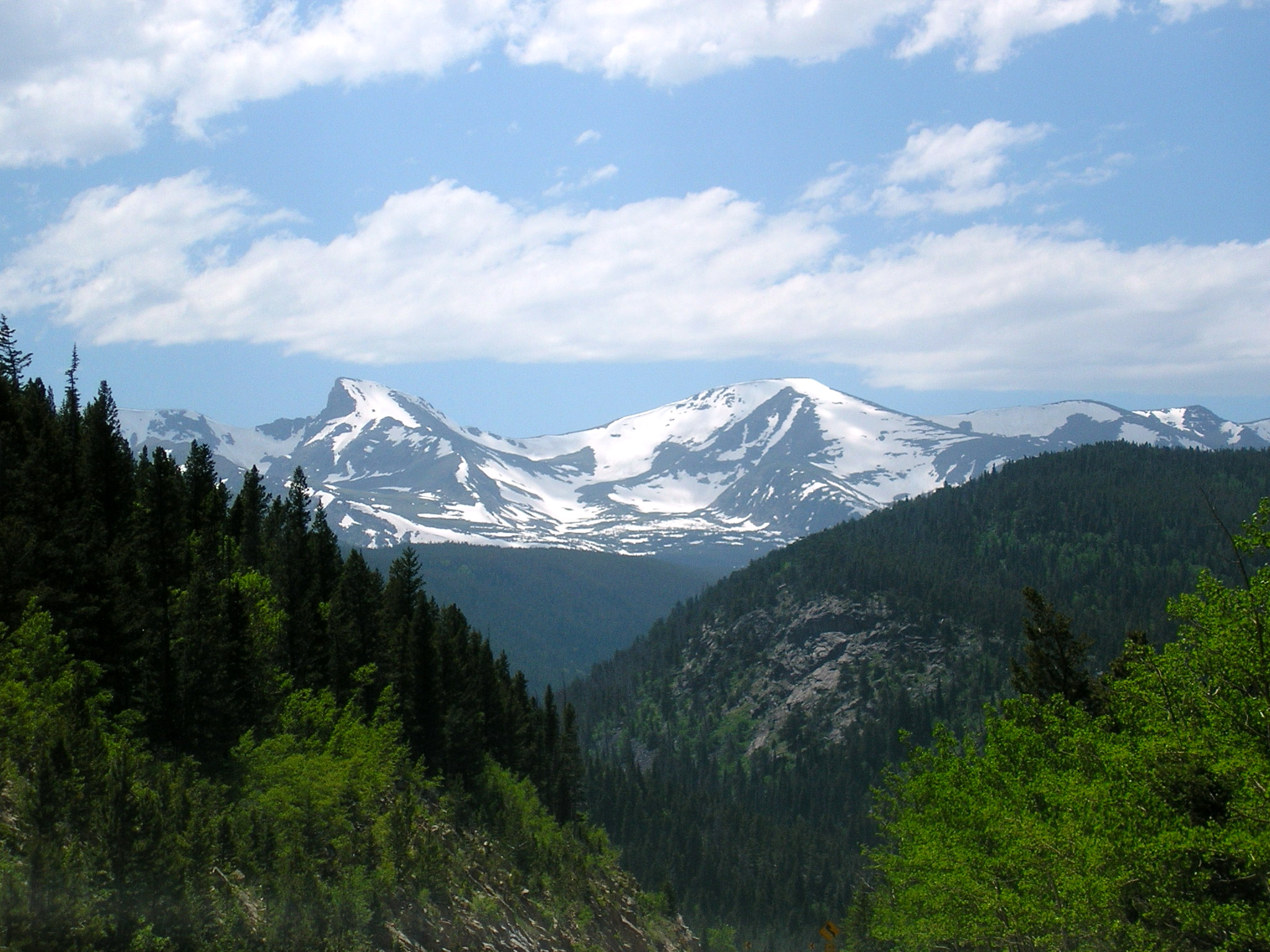
The Indian Peaks Wilderness from the Peak to Peak Scenic Byway

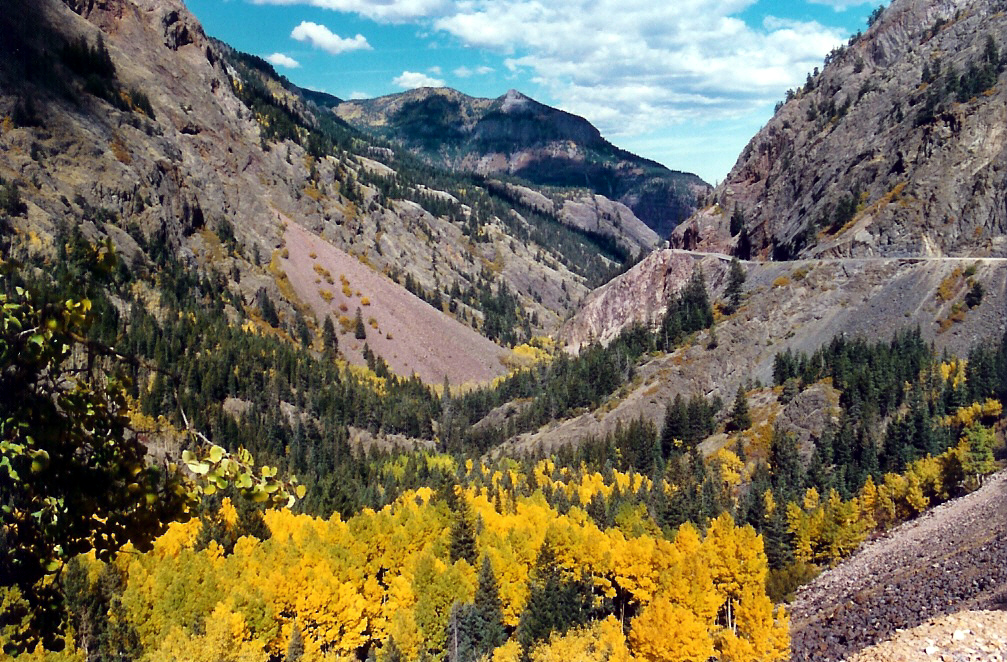
Uncompahgre Gorge along the San Juan Skyway Scenic and Historic Byway

Bent's Old Fort National Historic Site on the Santa Fe Trail Scenic and Historic Byway

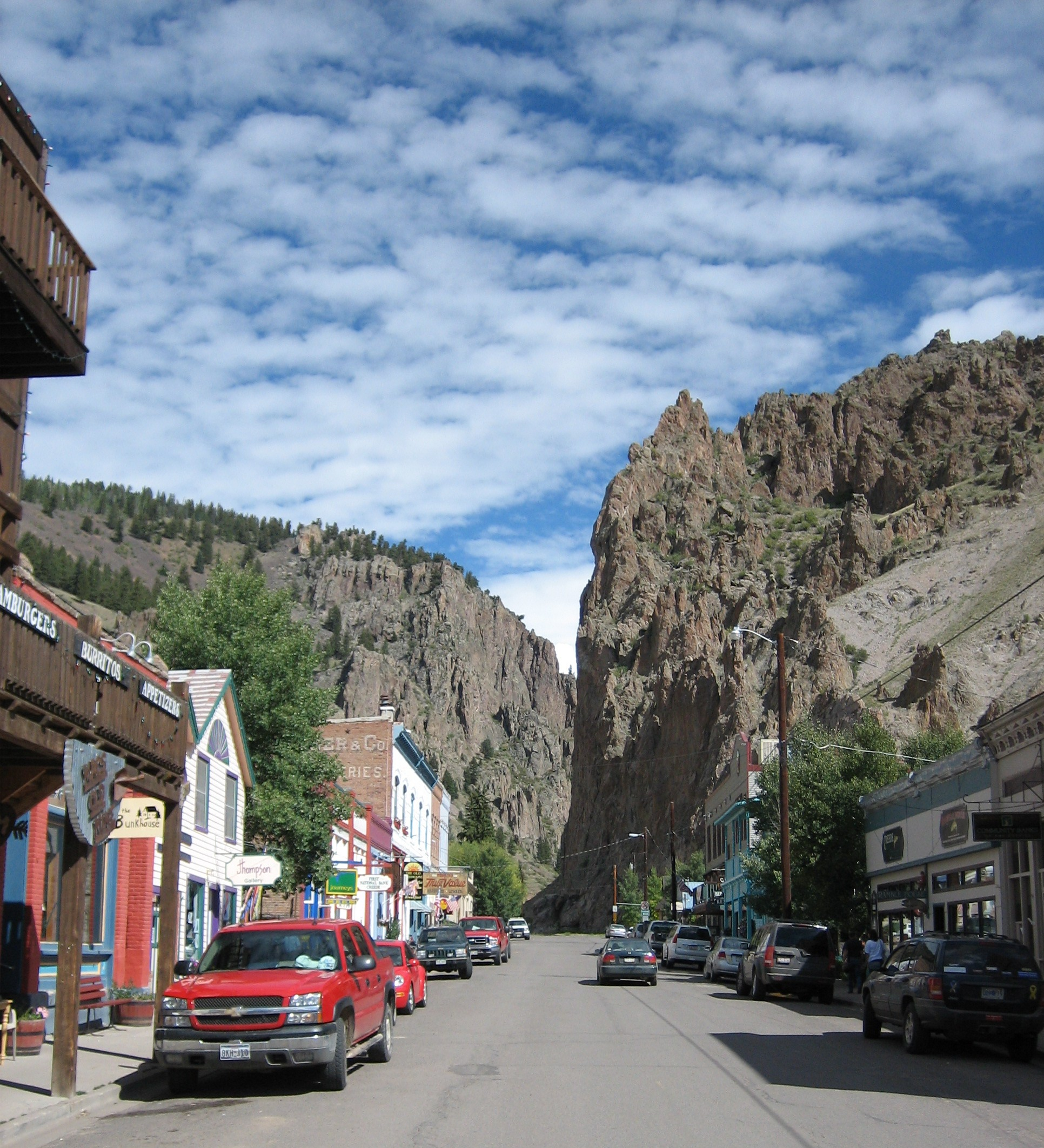
Creede on the Silver Thread Scenic and Historic Byway

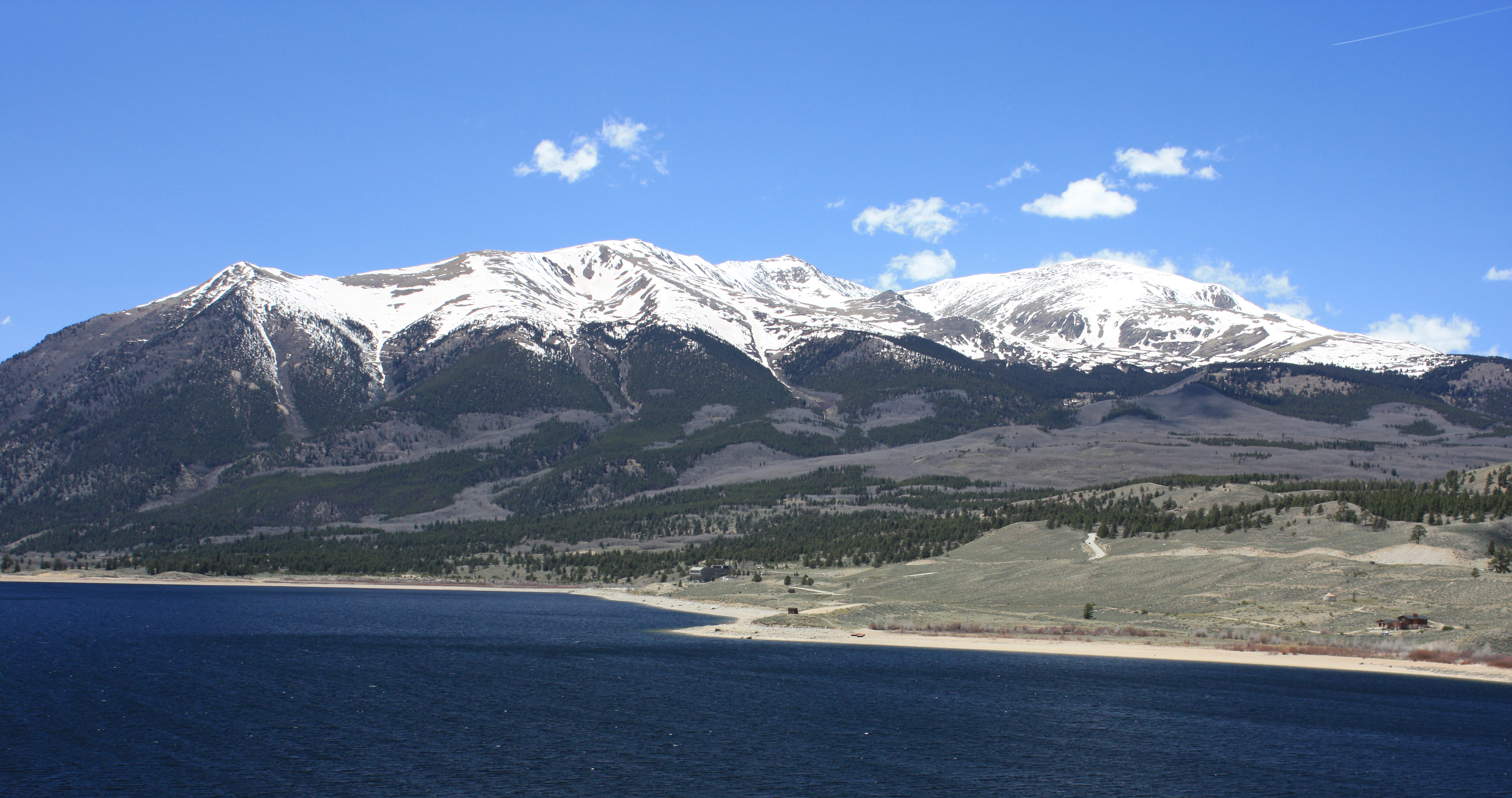
Mount Elbert and Twin Lakes along the Top of the Rockies Scenic Byway

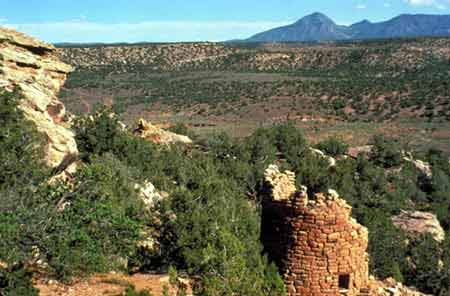
Canyons of the Ancients National Monument on the Trail of the Ancients Scenic and Historic Byway

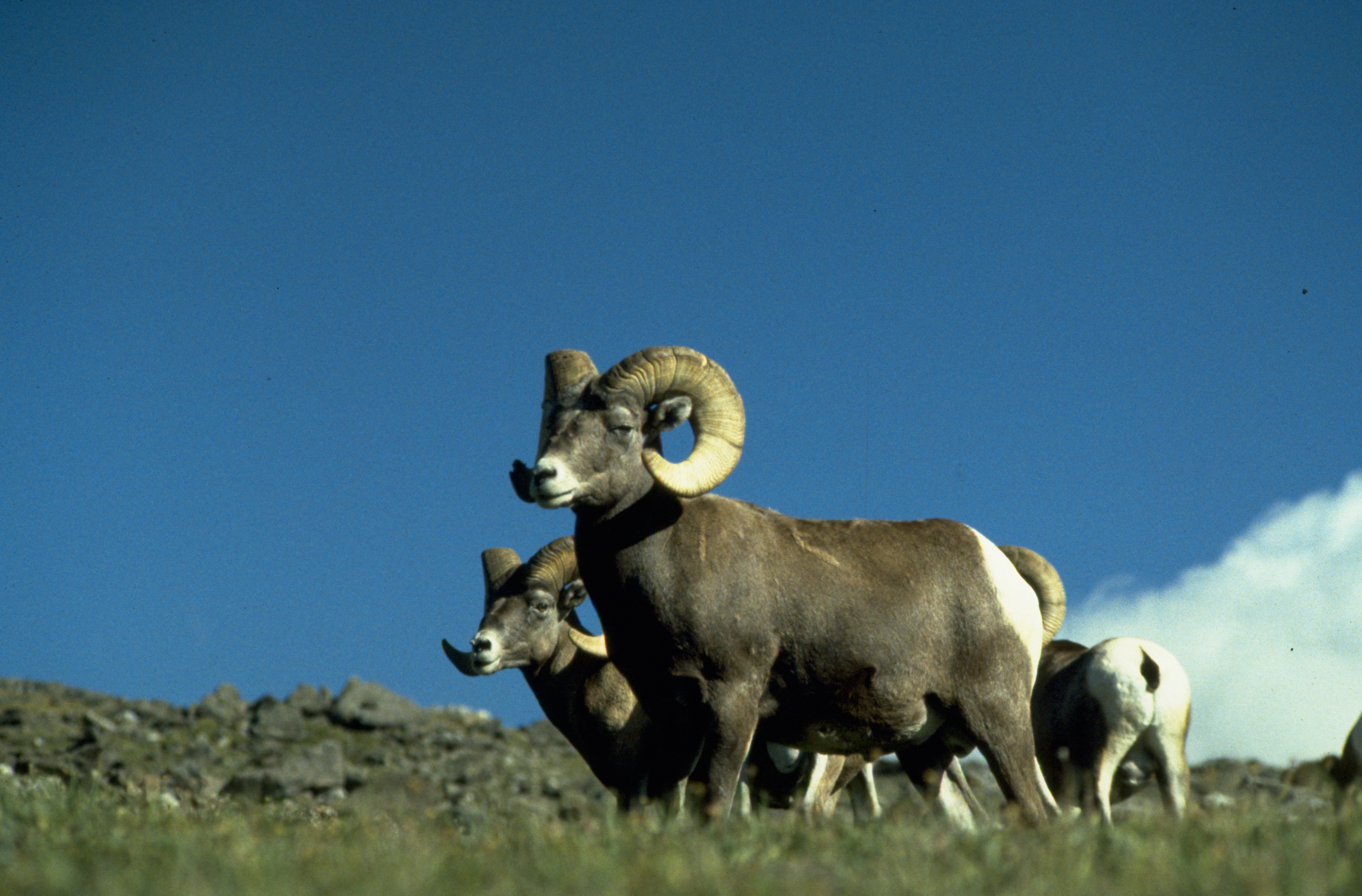
Rocky Mountain bighorn sheep along the Trail Ridge Road/Beaver Meadow Scenic Byway

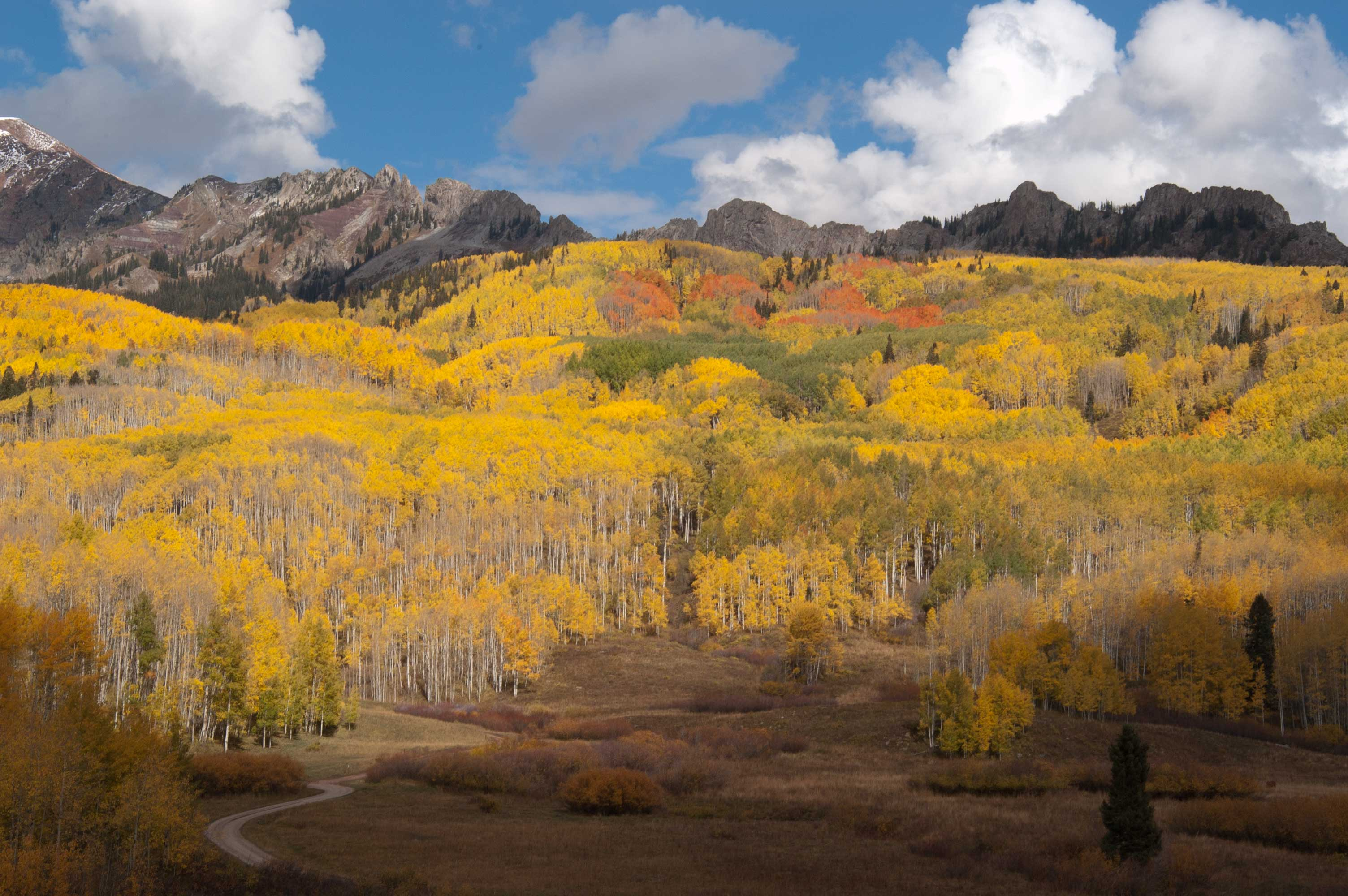
Autumn along the West Elk Loop Scenic and Historic Byway

== See also ==
- Scenic byways in the United States
- Bibliography of Colorado
- Geography of Colorado
- History of Colorado
- Index of Colorado-related articles
- List of Colorado-related lists
- Outline of Colorado
