= Flat Tops Trail Scenic Byway =

Colorado Scenic and Historic Byway

Coordinates: 40.1119°N 107.2956°W

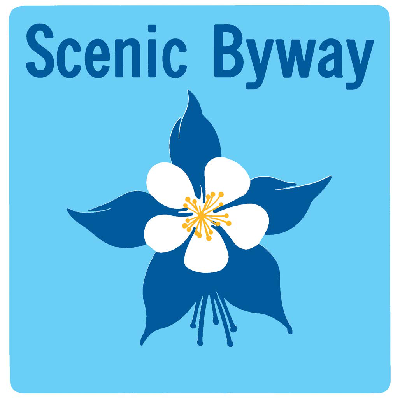
Flat Tops Trail Scenic Byway

Route information
- Maintained by CDOT
- Length: 82 mi (132 km)
- Existed: 1991–present

Major junctions
- West end: SH 13 Meeker
- East end: SH 131 Yampa

Location
- Country: United States
- State: Colorado
- Counties: Routt, Garfield, and Rio Blanco

Highway system
- Scenic Byways; National; National Forest; BLM; NPS; Colorado State Highway System; Interstate; US; State; Scenic

The Flat Tops Trail Scenic Byway is a National Forest Scenic Byway and Colorado Scenic and Historic Byway located in Routt, Garfield, and Rio Blanco counties, Colorado, US.

== Gallery ==
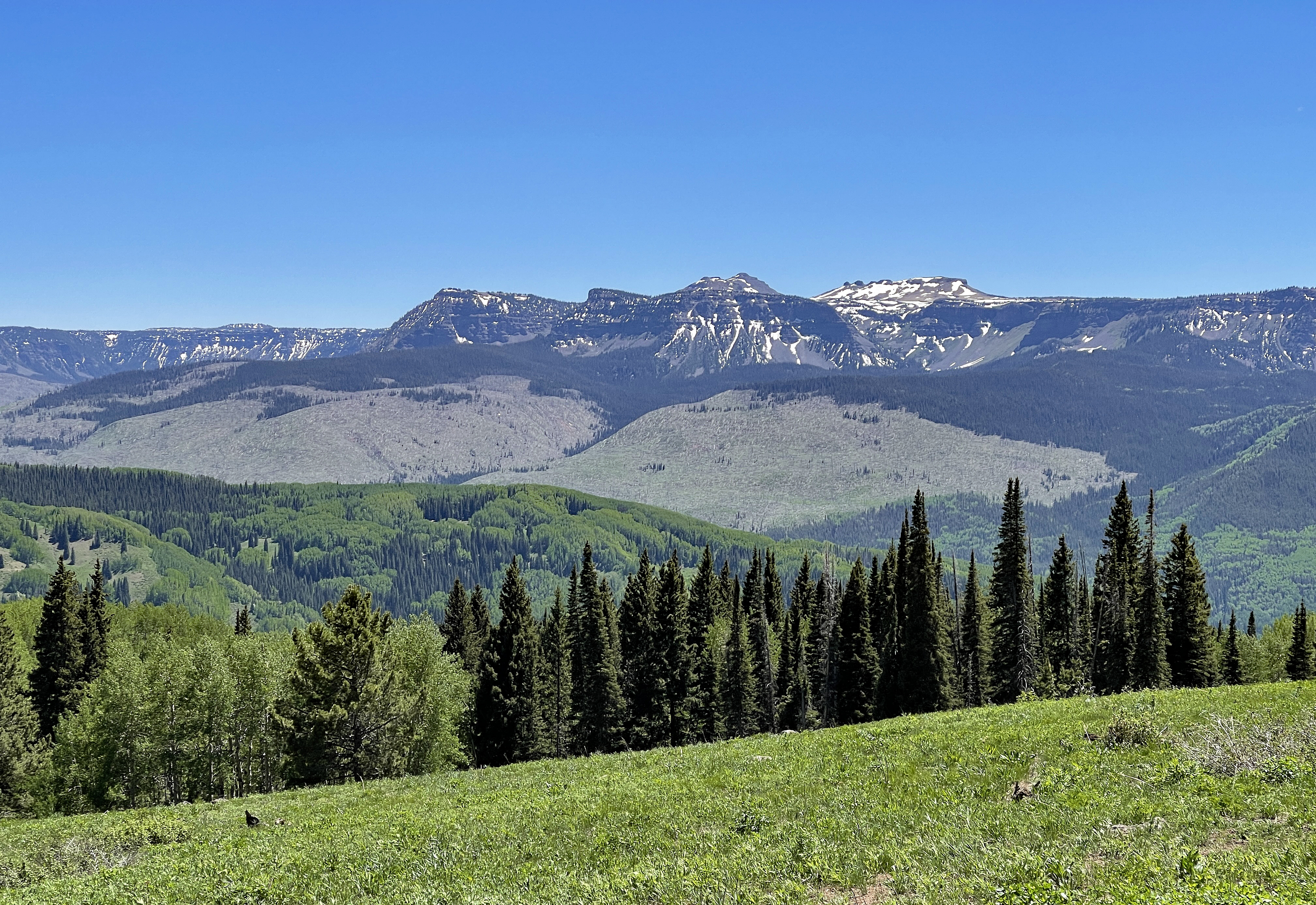
The Flat Tops Wilderness from the Ripple Creek Overlook

== See also ==
- History Colorado
- List of scenic byways in Colorado
- Scenic byways in the United States
