= West Elk Loop Scenic and Historic Byway =

Colorado Scenic and Historic Byway

Coordinates: 38.8497°N 107.1003°W

West Elk Loop Scenic and Historic Byway

Route information
- Maintained by CDOT
- Length: 205 mi (330 km)
- Existed: 1991–present

Major junctions
- North end: SH 82 / SH 133 Carbondale
- South end: US 50 / SH 135 Gunnison

Location
- Country: United States
- State: Colorado
- Counties: Delta, Garfield, Gunnison, Montrose, and Pitkin counties

Highway system
- Scenic Byways; National; National Forest; BLM; NPS; Colorado State Highway System; Interstate; US; State; Scenic

The West Elk Loop Scenic and Historic Byway is a 205-mile (330 km) National Forest Scenic Byway and Colorado Scenic and Historic Byway located in Delta, Garfield, Gunnison, Montrose, and Pitkin counties Colorado, USA. The byway reaches its zenith at Kebler Pass, elevation 10,007 feet (3,050 m), between Crested Butte and Paonia.

== Route ==
The northern end of the Byway begins at the intersection of SH 82 and SH 133 in Carbondale. The route follows SH 133 south down the Crystal River Valley past Mount Sopris and Redstone to McClure Pass, with an official detour option to Marble. The true Loop portion of the Byway begins and ends below Paonia Reservoir and The Raggeds where Kebler Pass intersects SH 133. The west side of the Loop passes through Somerset, Paonia, and Hotchkiss on SH 133, and through Crawford on SH 92. The Black Canyon of the Gunnison National Park, Curecanti National Recreation Area, and Blue Mesa Reservoir are all accessible from SH 92. The southern portion of the loop follows SH 92 to its intersection with US 50 near Blue Mesa Reservoir, continues along US 50 to Gunnison, and then returns north to Crested Butte via SH 135. From Crested Butte, one can only complete the full loop back to SH 133 in summer months, when unpaved Gunnison County Road 12 is plowed over Kebler Pass.

== Gallery ==
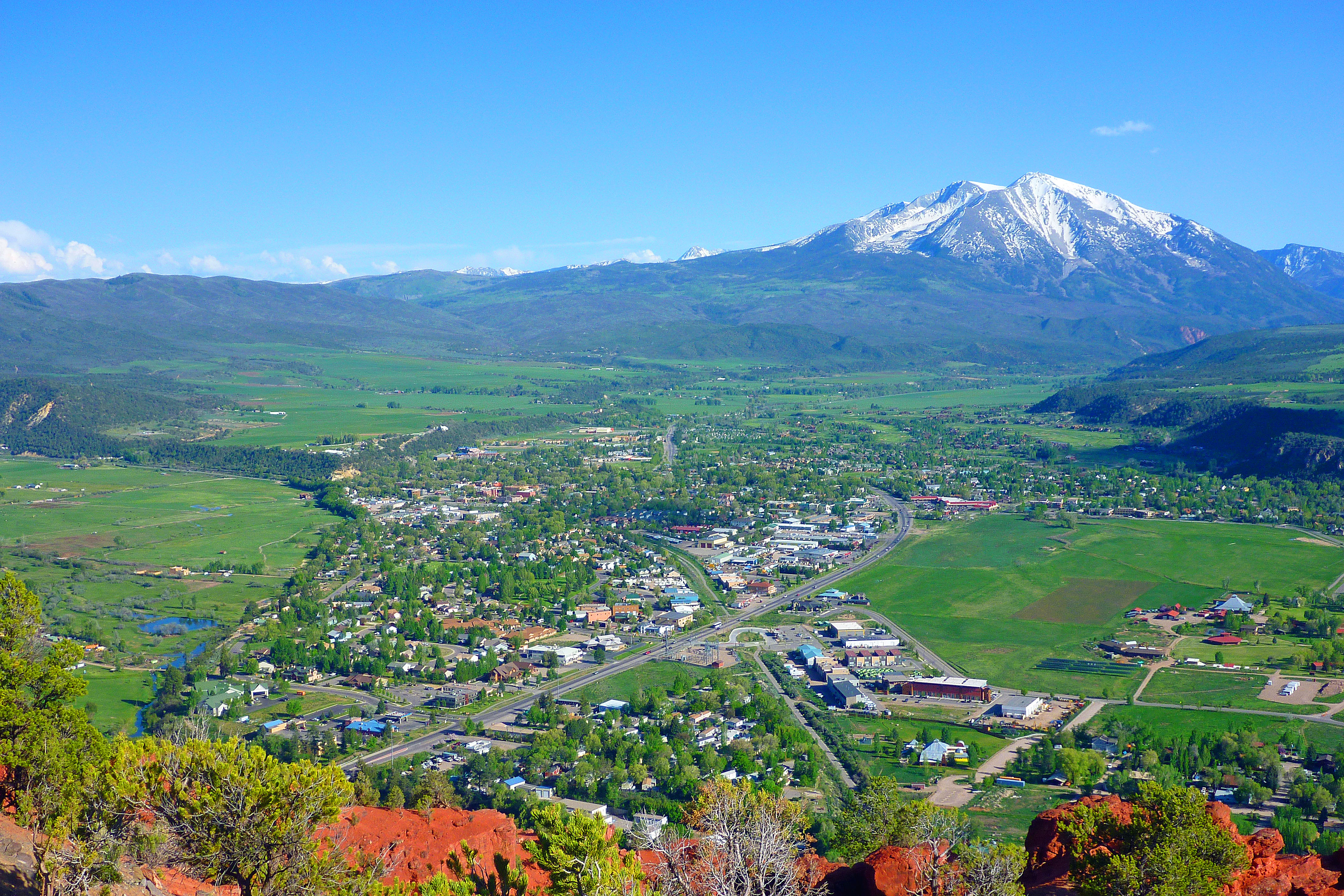
Carbondale and the Byway running south via SH 133 past Mount Sopris

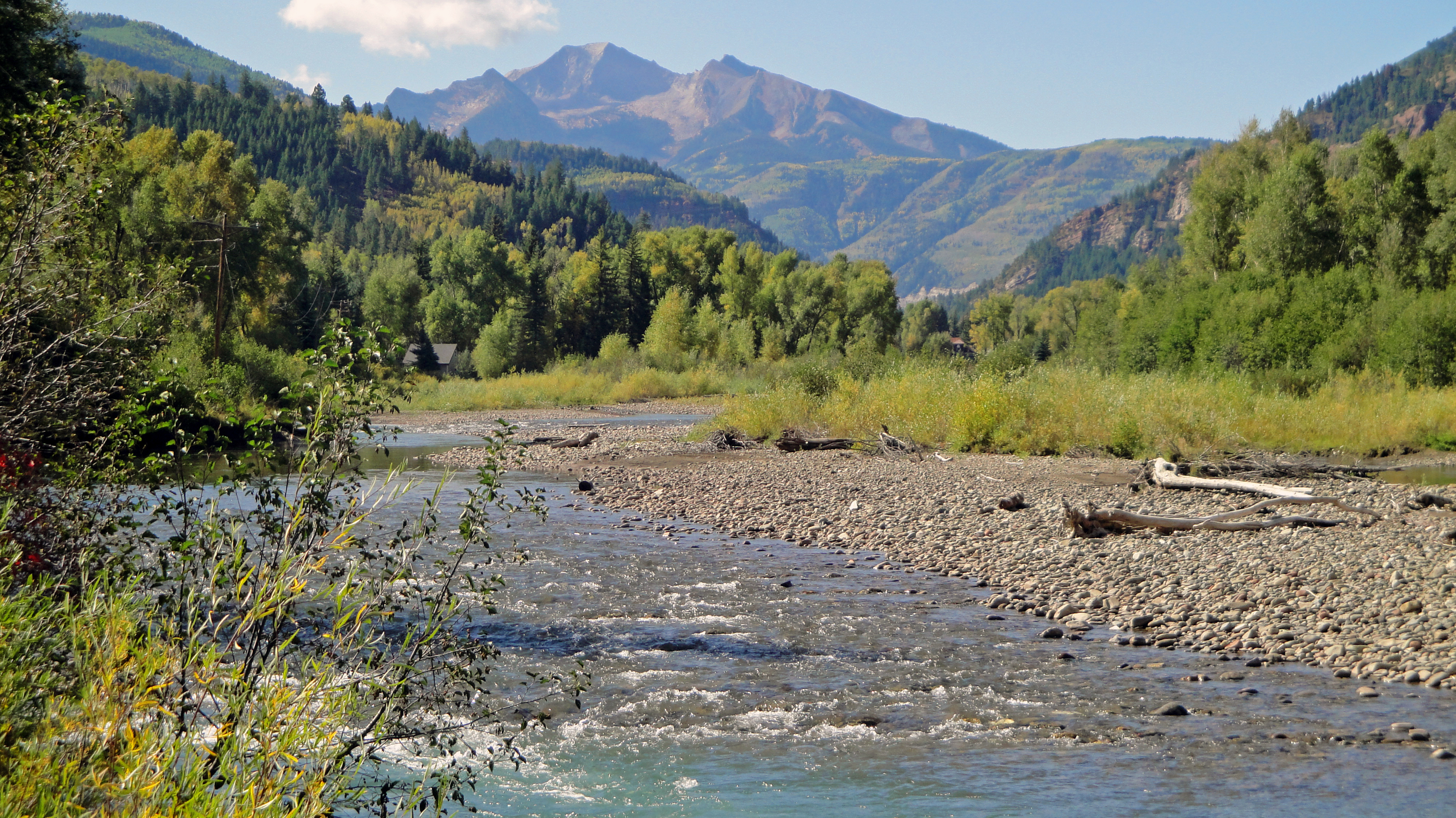
Crystal River Valley and Chair Mountain along SH 133

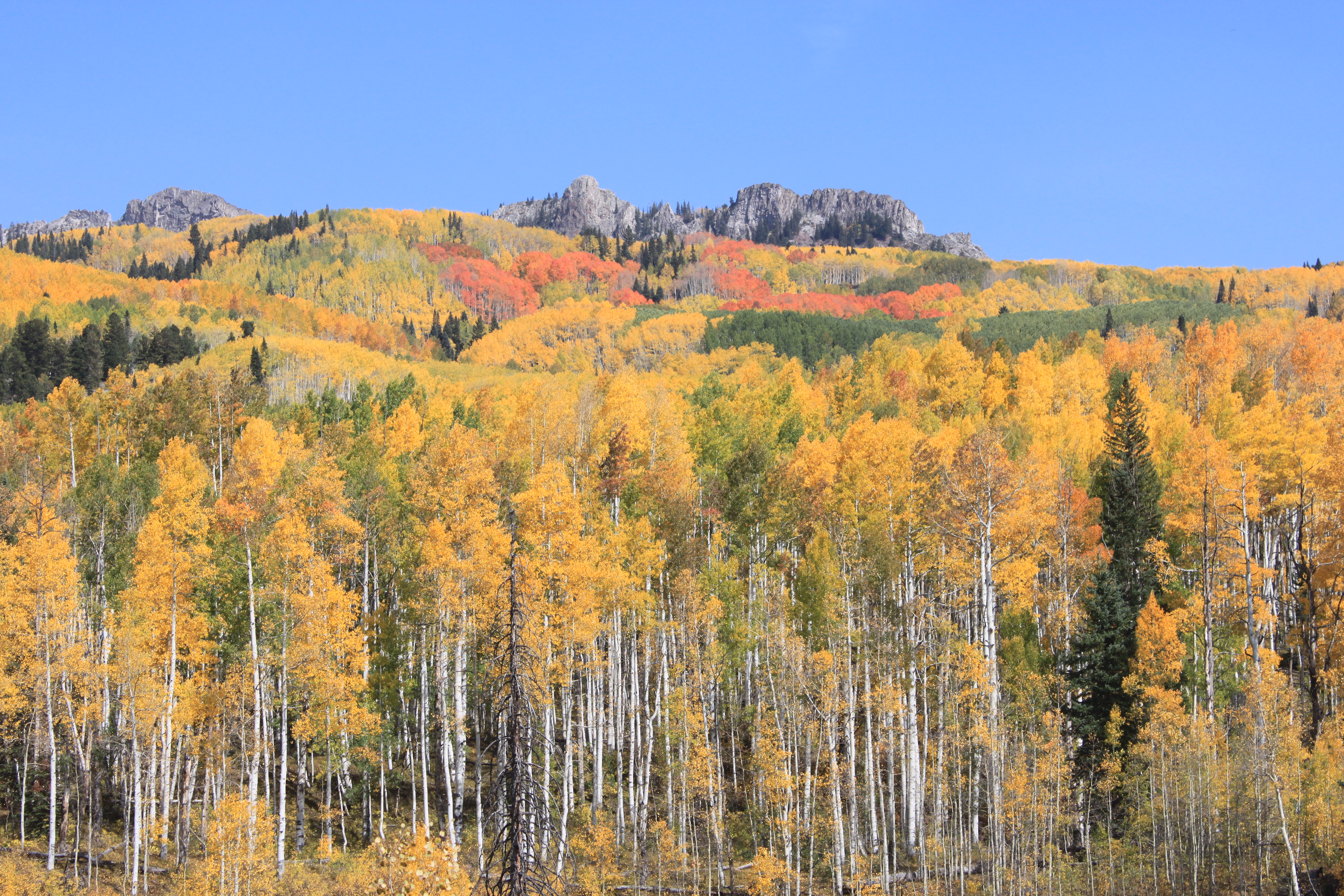
Riot of Fall Colors at Kebler Pass

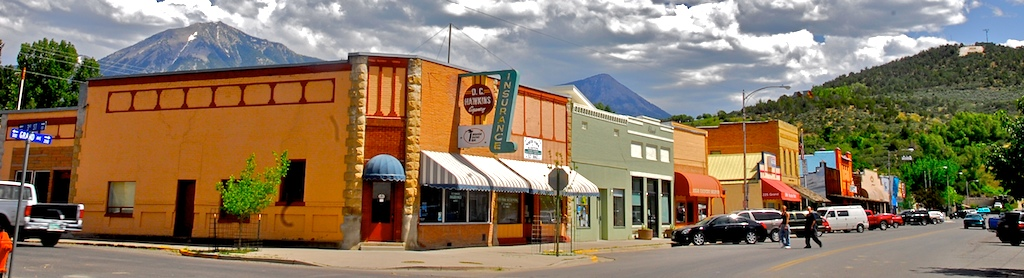
3rd and Grand in downtown Paonia

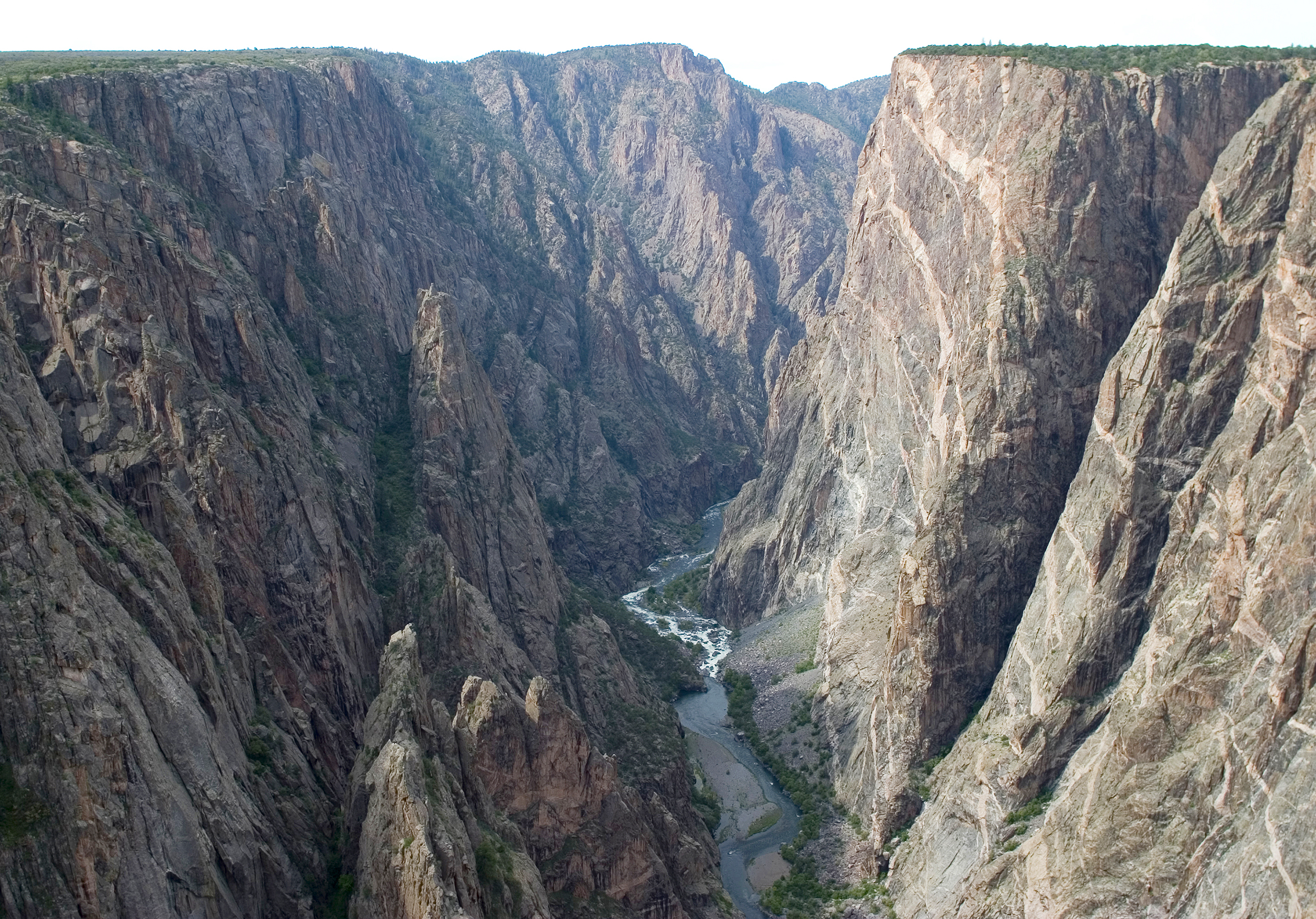
Black Canyon of the Gunnison National Park, accessible from SH 92

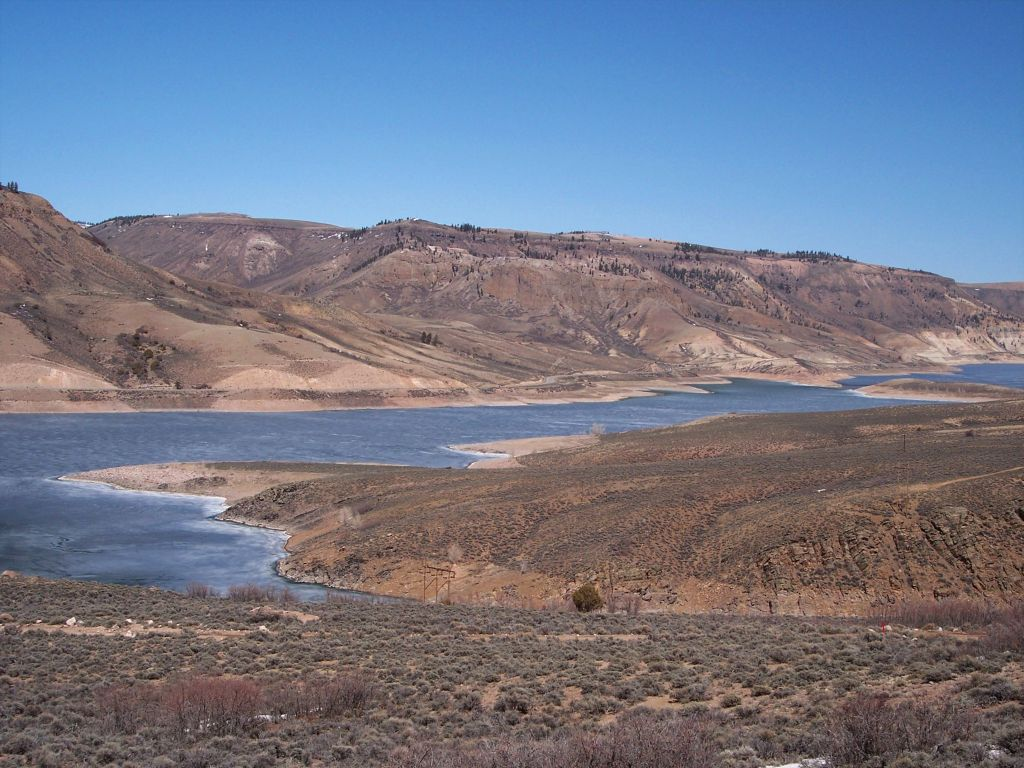
Blue Mesa Reservoir, near US 50

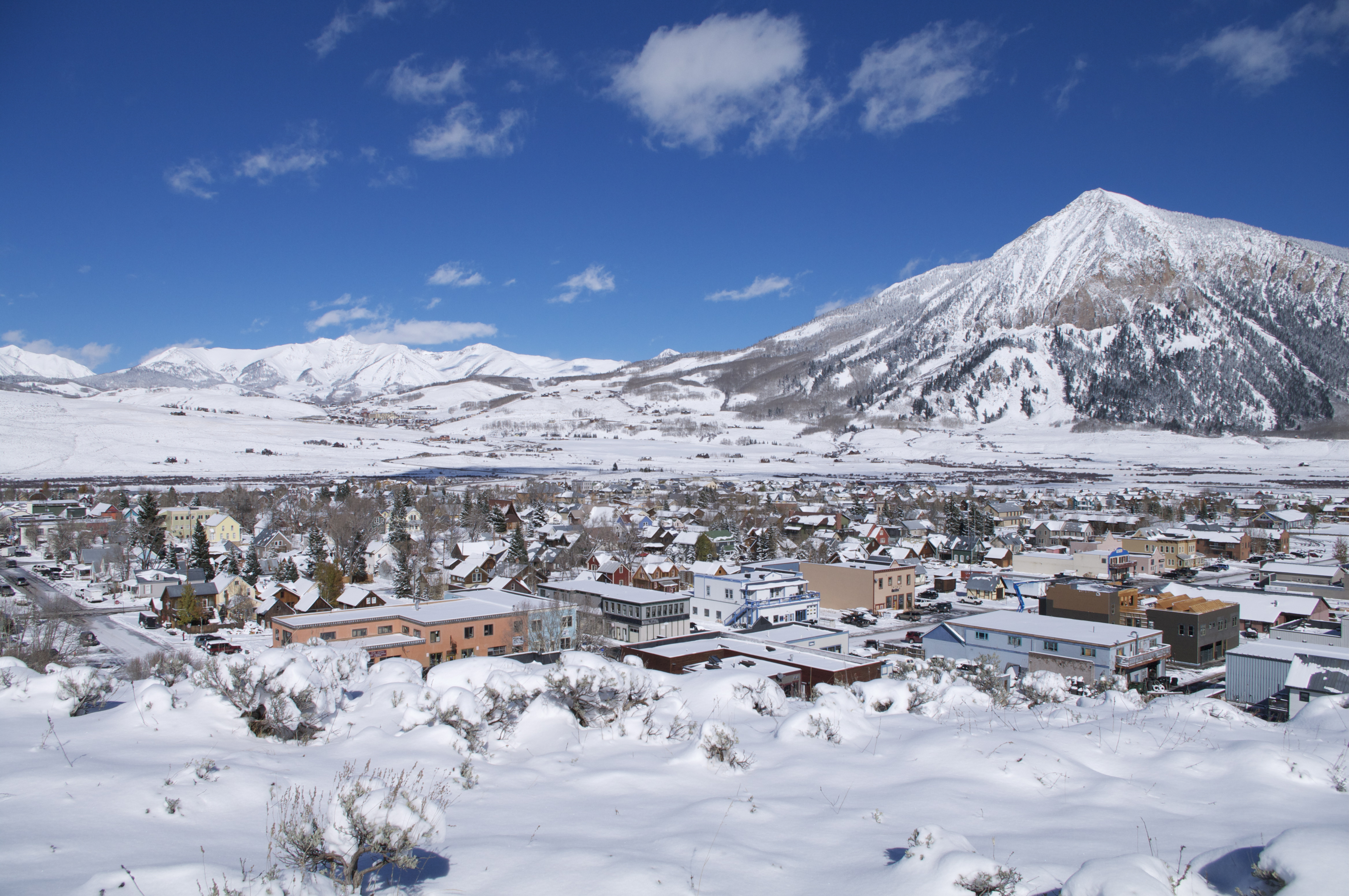
Crested Butte, where Kebler Pass meets SH 135

== See also ==
- History Colorado
- List of scenic byways in Colorado
- Scenic byways in the United States
