= Cirque Mountain (Colorado) =

Mountain in Colorado, United States

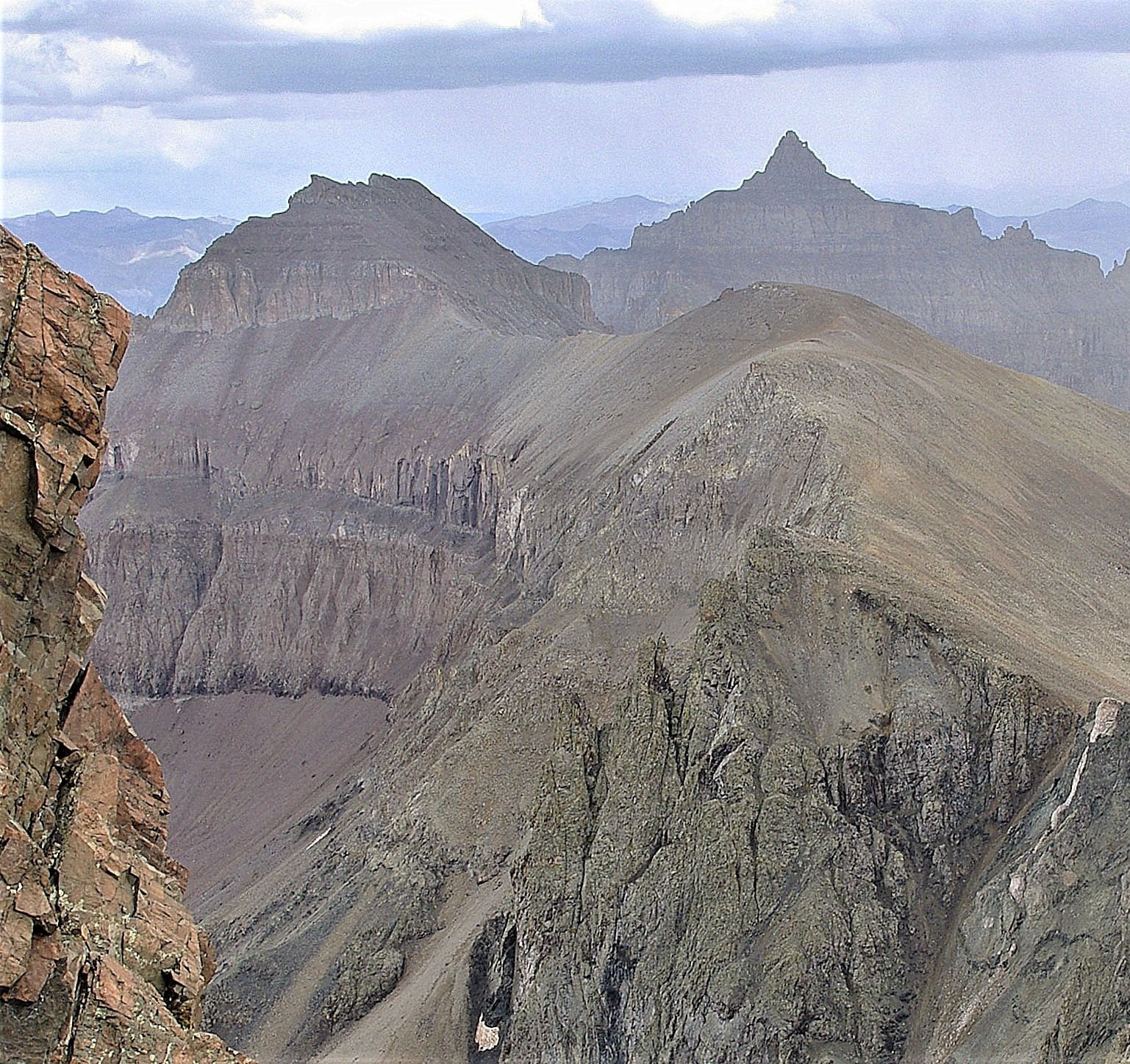
- Cirque Mountain (left), west aspect. (Teakettle Mtn upper right, from Mt. Sneffels)

Highest point
- Elevation: 13,686 ft (4,171 m)
- Prominence: 526 ft (160 m)
- Parent peak: Teakettle Mountain (13,819 ft)
- Isolation: 0.57 mi (0.92 km)
- Coordinates: 38°00′14″N 107°46′18″W

Naming
- Etymology: cirque

Geography
- Location within Colorado Location within the United States
- Location: Ouray County; Colorado, US
- Parent range: Rocky Mountains; San Juan Mountains; Sneffels Range
- Topo map: USGS Mount Sneffels

Geology
- Rock type: Extrusive rock

Climbing
- Easiest route: class 2+ Southwest Ridge

Cirque Mountain is a 13,686-foot-elevation (4,171-meter) mountain summit located in Ouray County of southwest Colorado, United States. It is situated six miles west of the community of Ouray, above the north side of Yankee Boy Basin, on land managed by Uncompahgre National Forest. It is part of the Sneffels Range which is a subset of the San Juan Mountains, which in turn is part of the Rocky Mountains. Cirque ranks as the 155th-highest peak in Colorado, and the ninth-highest in the Sneffels Range. It is west of the Continental Divide, 1.12 mile east of Mount Sneffels, and 0.59 mile west of Teakettle Mountain, which is the nearest higher neighbor. Topographic relief is significant as the north aspect rises 3,000 feet (910 meters) above Blaine Basin in one mile, and the south aspect rises over 2,000 feet above Yankee Boy Basin in less than one mile. These basins are cirques which were carved by ancient glaciers. The mountain's name has been officially adopted by the United States Board on Geographic Names.

== Climate ==
According to the Köppen climate classification system, Cirque Mountain is located in an alpine subarctic climate zone with long, cold, snowy winters, and cool to warm summers. Due to its altitude, it receives precipitation all year, as snow in winter, and as thunderstorms in summer, with a dry period in late spring. Precipitation runoff from the mountain drains into tributaries of the Uncompahgre River.

== Gallery ==
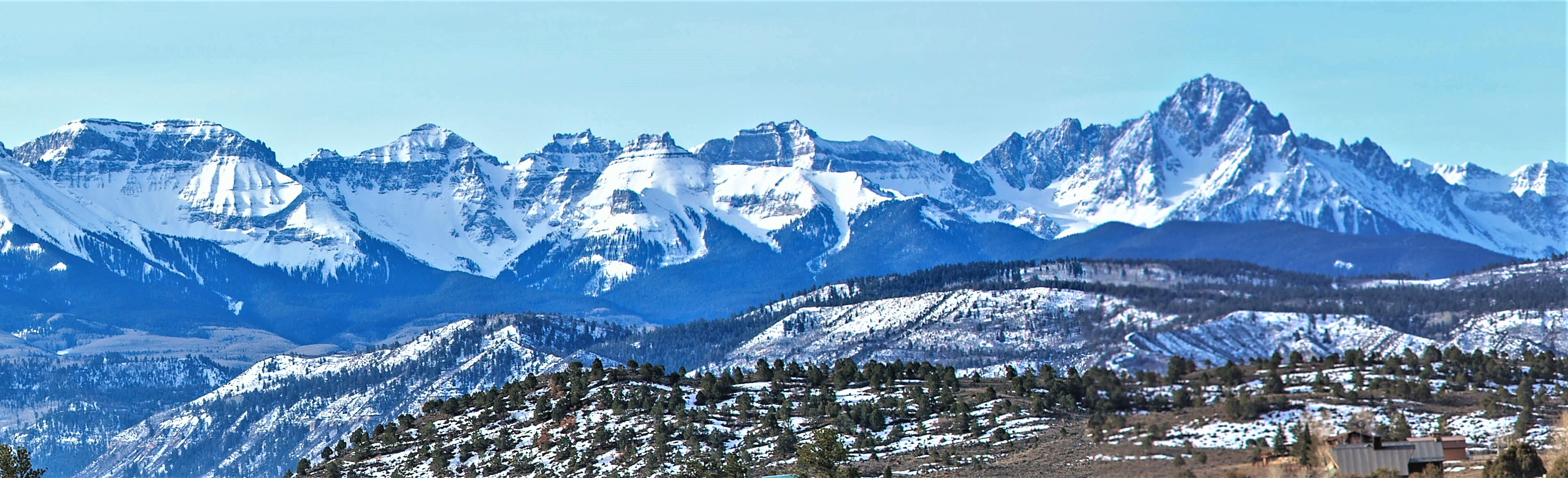
Sneffels Range from the north. Left to right: Whitehouse Mountain, Mount Ridgway, Teakettle Mountain, Cirque Mountain (centered), Mount Sneffels.

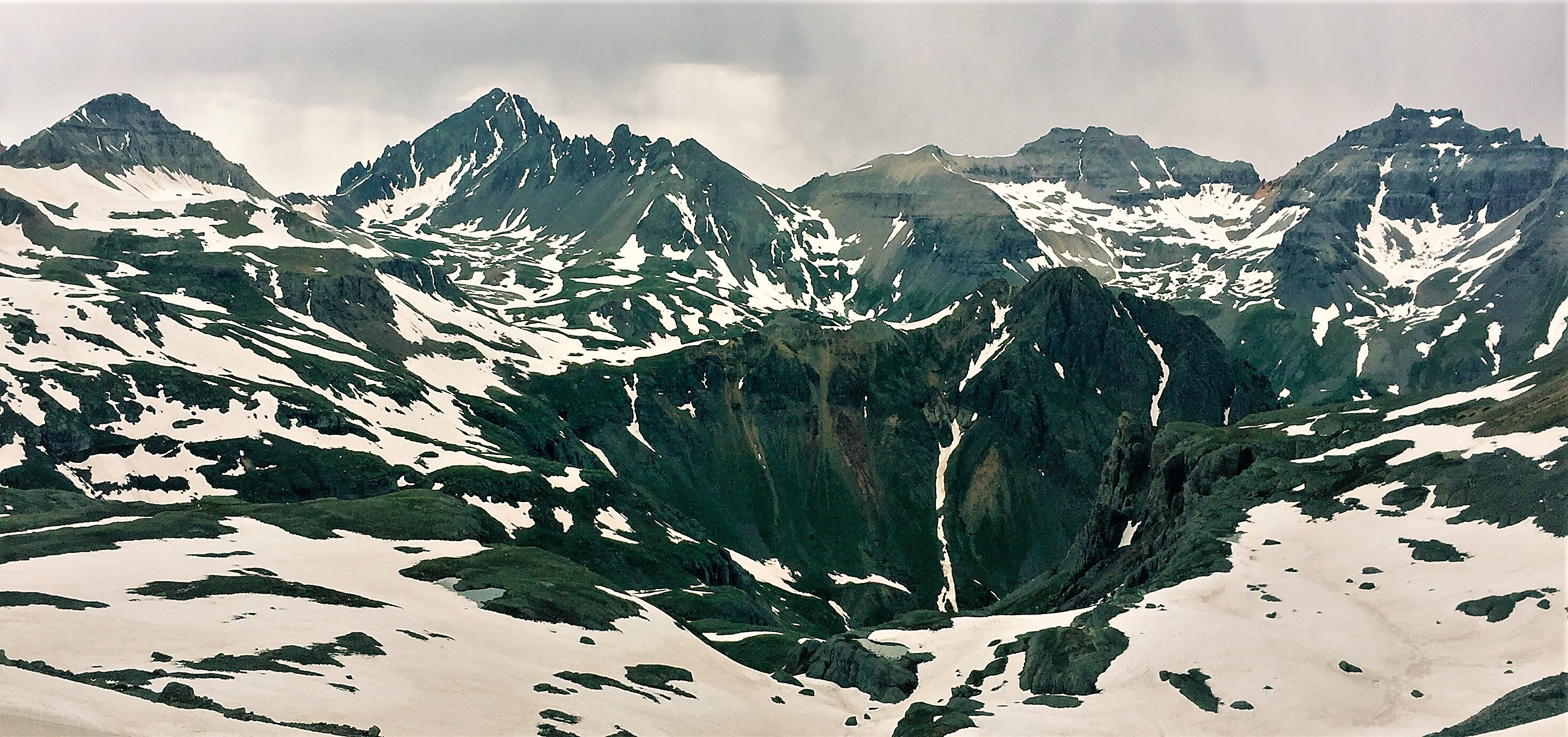
Left to rightː Gilpin Peak, Mt. Sneffels, Cirque Mountain, Teakettle Mountain.
(Stony Mountain below Cirque). Looking north.

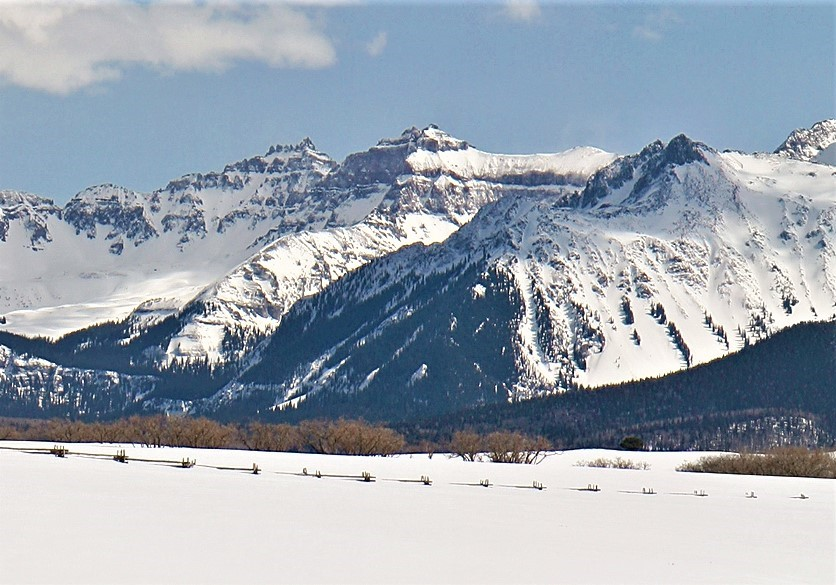
Cirque Mountain centered, Teakettle (left), Blaine Peak (right). From NW.

== See also ==
- Mountains of Ouray County, Colorado
