= Stony Mountain (Colorado) =

Mountain in Colorado, United States

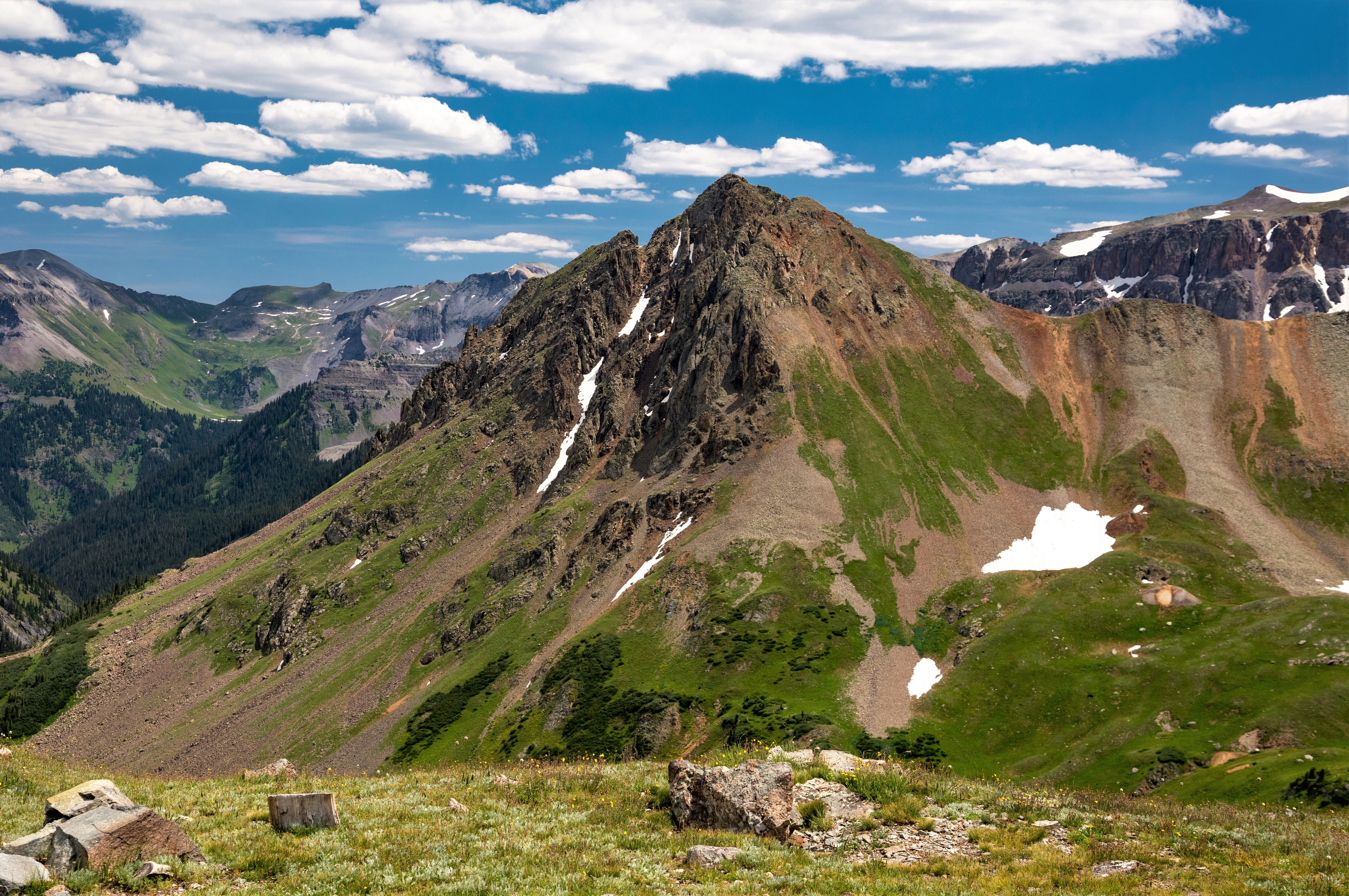
- Northwest aspect

Highest point
- Elevation: 12,698 ft (3,870 m)
- Prominence: 414 ft (126 m)
- Parent peak: Mount Emma (13,581 ft)
- Isolation: 1.14 mi (1.83 km)
- Coordinates: 37°58′57″N 107°46′17″W

Geography
- Location within Colorado Location within the United States
- Location: Ouray County; Colorado, US
- Parent range: Rocky Mountains; San Juan Mountains; Sneffels Range
- Topo map: USGS Telluride

Geology
- Rock type: Extrusive rock

Climbing
- Easiest route: class 2+ scrambling

Stony Mountain is a 12,698-foot-elevation (3,870-meter) mountain summit located in Ouray County of southwest Colorado, United States. It is situated five miles southwest of the community of Ouray, on land managed by Uncompahgre National Forest. It is part of the Sneffels Range which is a subset of the San Juan Mountains, which in turn is part of the Rocky Mountains. It is situated west of the Continental Divide, 1.3 miles southwest of Potosi Peak, and 1.15 miles northeast of parent Mount Emma. Yankee Boy Basin is surrounded by Stony Mountain, Gilpin Peak, Mount Sneffels, Cirque Mountain, and Teakettle Mountain. Topographic relief is significant as the east aspect rises 2,000 feet (610 meters) above Sneffels Creek in less than one mile. The mountain's name, which has been officially adopted by the United States Board on Geographic Names, was in use before 1899 when Henry Gannett published it in A Dictionary of Altitudes in the United States.

== Climate ==
According to the Köppen climate classification system, Stony Mountain is located in an alpine subarctic climate zone with cold, snowy winters, and cool to warm summers. Due to its altitude, it receives precipitation all year, as snow in winter, and as thunderstorms in summer, with a dry period in late spring. Precipitation runoff from the mountain drains into tributaries of the Uncompahgre River.

== See also ==
- Mountains of Ouray County, Colorado
