= Mount Emma =

Mountain in Colorado, United States

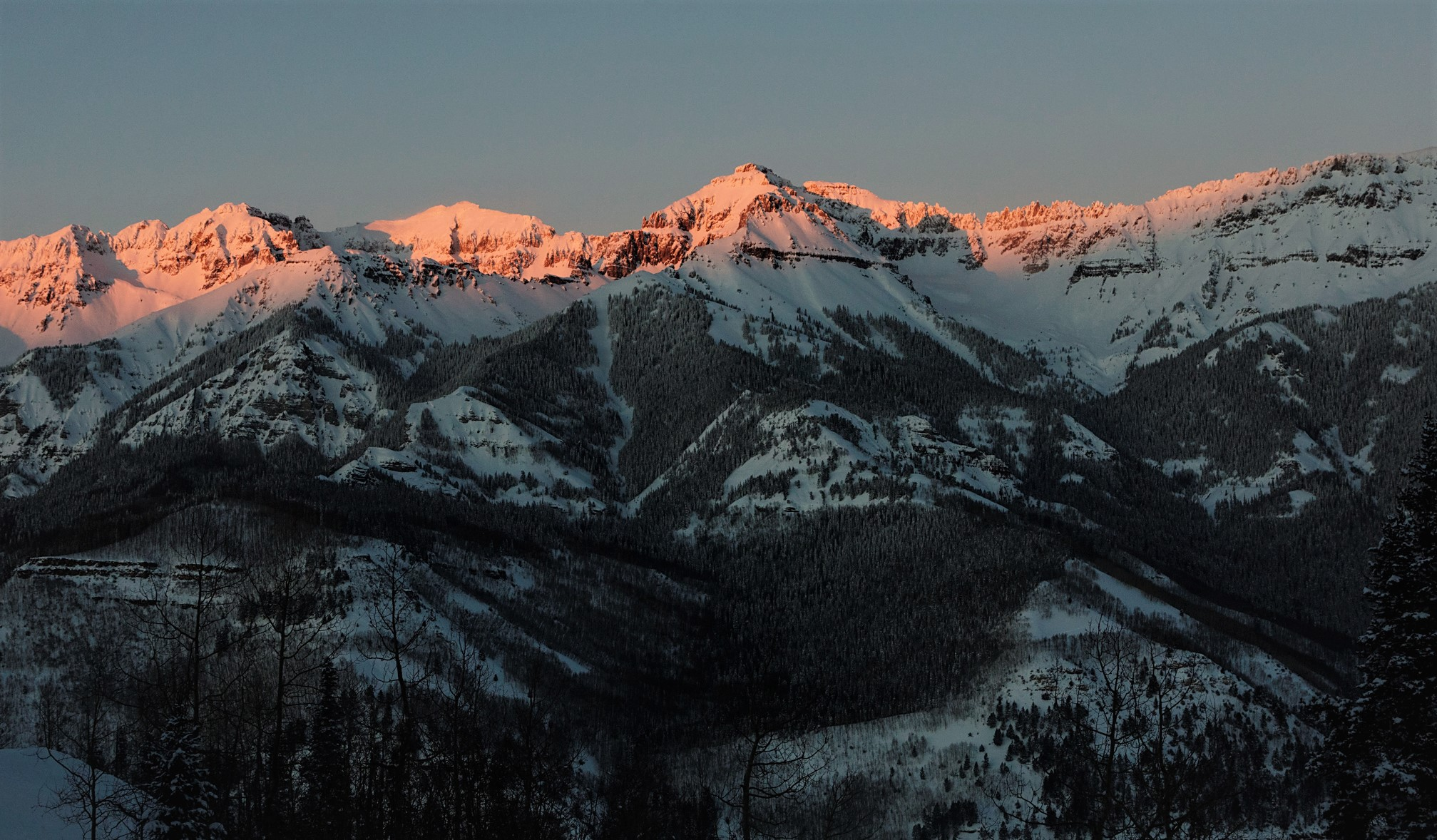
- The top of Mt. Emma can be seen centered (behind Greenback Mountain)

Highest point
- Elevation: 13,581 ft (4,139 m)
- Prominence: 541 ft (165 m)
- Parent peak: Gilpin Peak (13,700 ft)
- Isolation: 0.82 mi (1.32 km)
- Coordinates: 37°58′30″N 107°47′25″W

Geography
- Location within Colorado Location within the United States
- Location: San Miguel County; Colorado, US
- Parent range: Rocky Mountains; San Juan Mountains; Sneffels Range
- Topo map: USGS Telluride

Geology
- Rock type: Extrusive rock

Climbing
- Easiest route: class 3 scrambling

Mount Emma is a 13,581-foot-elevation (4,139-meter) mountain summit located in San Miguel County of Colorado, United States. It is situated three miles north of the community of Telluride, on the south side of Yankee Boy Basin, in the Uncompahgre National Forest. It is part of the Sneffels Range which is a subset of the San Juan Mountains, which in turn is part of the Rocky Mountains. Mount Emma is situated west of the Continental Divide, two miles south of Mount Sneffels, and 0.8 mile south of Gilpin Peak, the nearest higher neighbor. Emma ranks as the 197th-highest peak in Colorado, and the 10th-highest in the Sneffels Range. Topographic relief is significant as the south aspect rises 4,830 feet (1,470 meters) above Telluride in approximately three miles. An ascent of Mt. Emma is a difficult climb with 2,180 feet of elevation gain covering three miles from Yankee Boy Basin, or 4,836 feet of elevation gain from Telluride. This mountain's name was officially adopted by the U.S. Board on Geographic Names.

== Climate ==
According to the Köppen climate classification system, Mount Emma is located in an alpine subarctic climate zone with long, cold, snowy winters, and cool to warm summers. Due to its altitude, it receives precipitation all year, as snow in winter, and as thunderstorms in summer, with a dry period in late spring. Precipitation runoff from the mountain drains into tributaries of the San Miguel River.

== Gallery ==
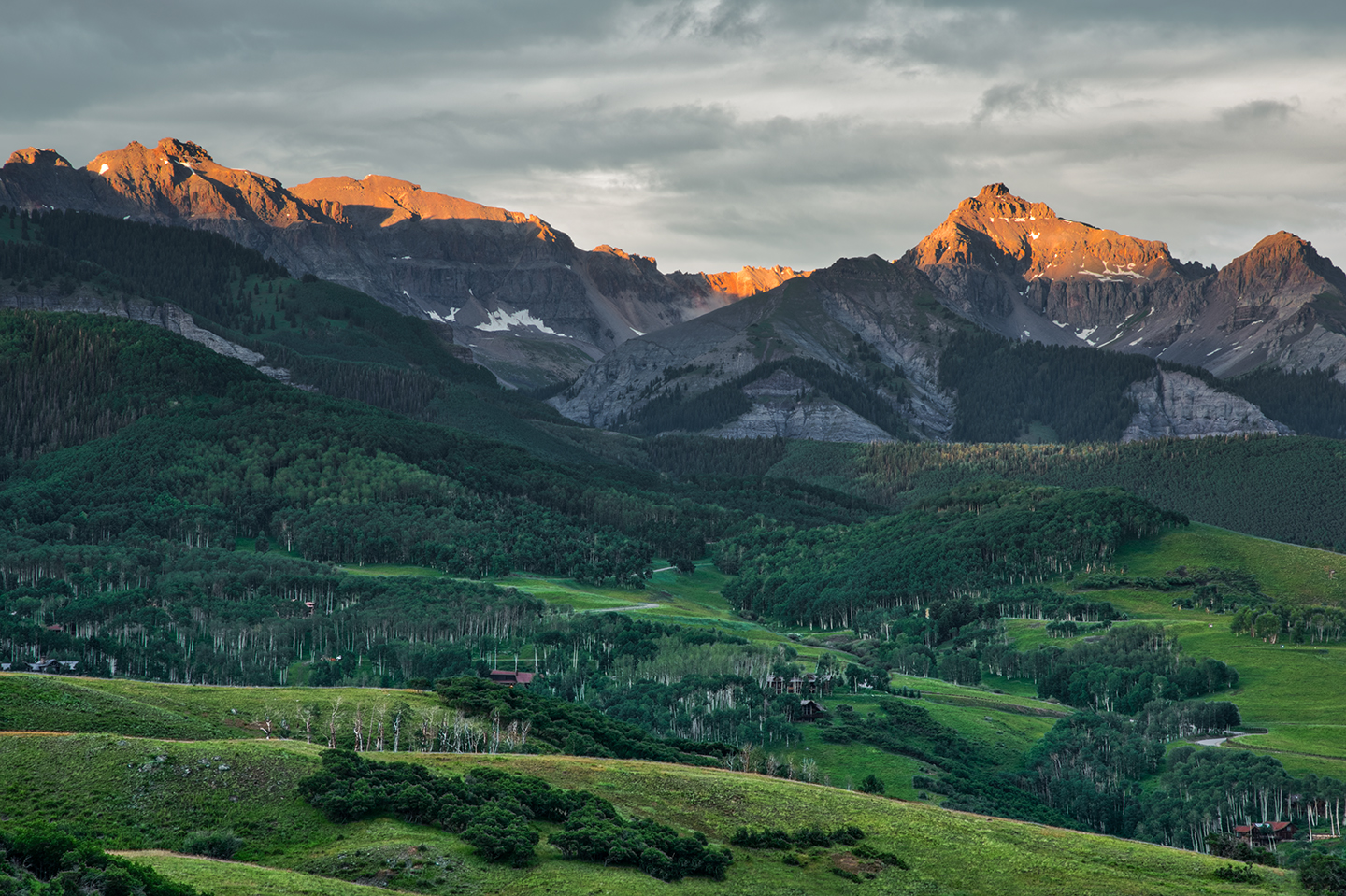
Gilpin Peak (left), Mount Emma (right)

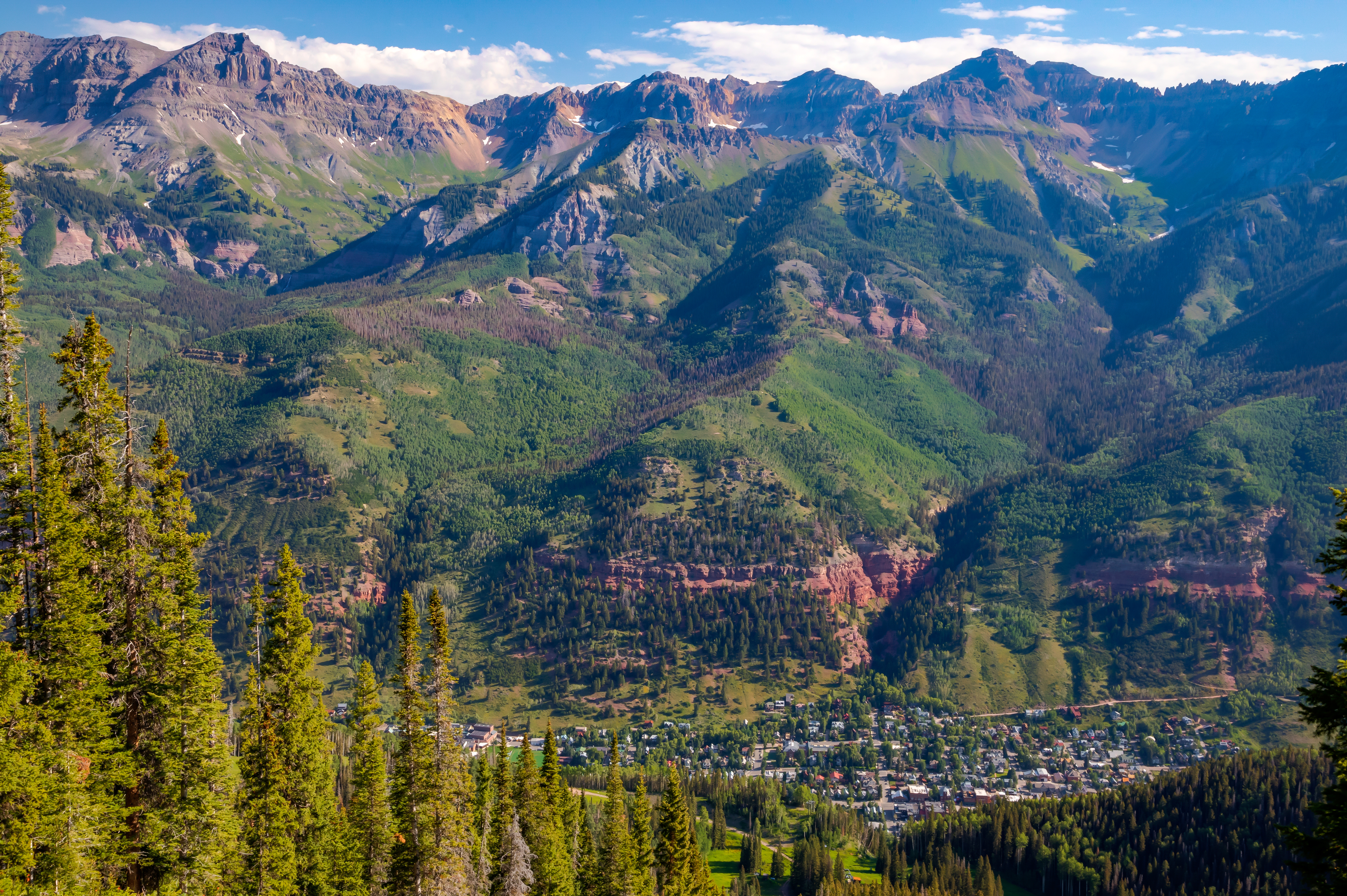
Mt. Emma upper right, Telluride below

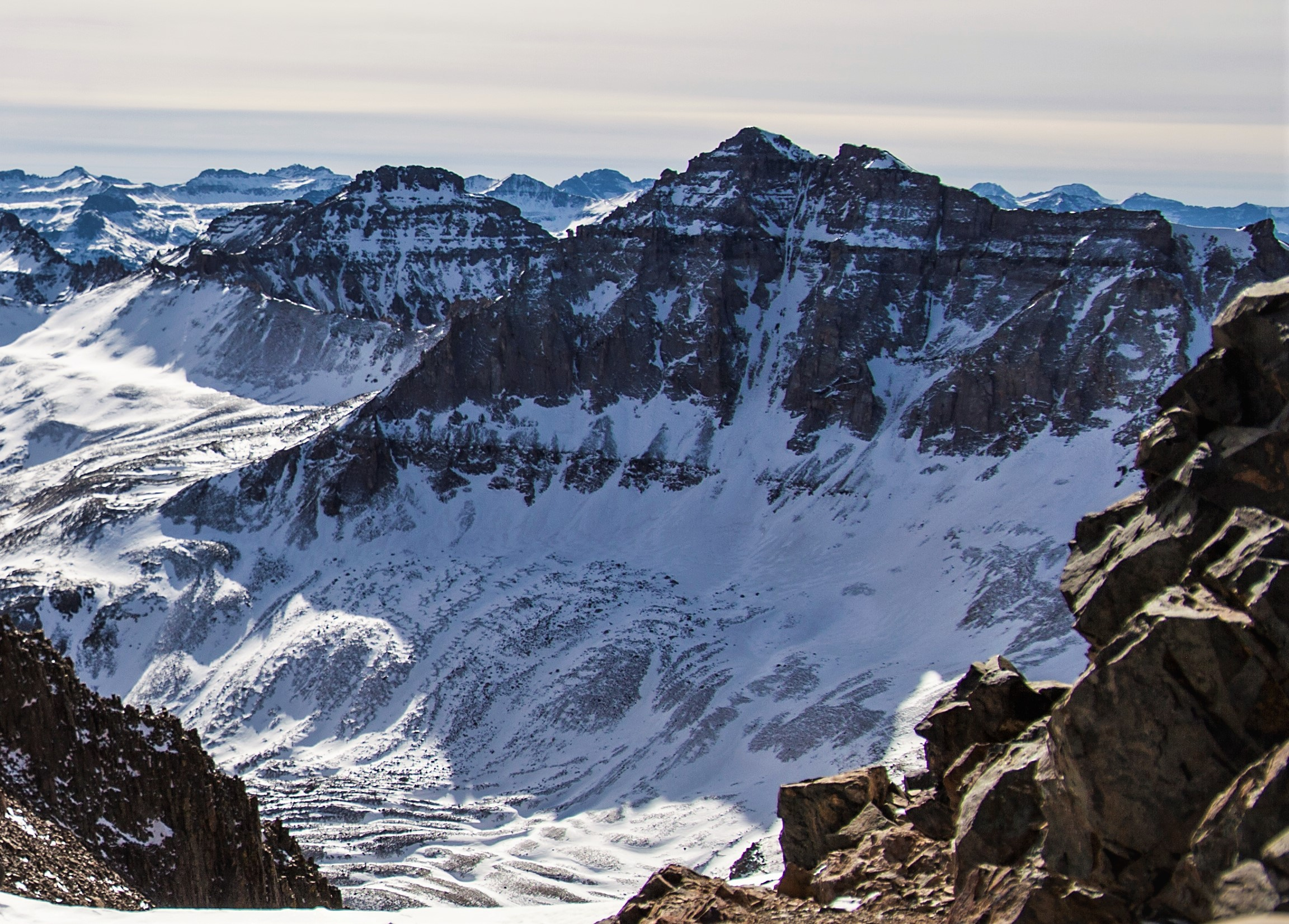
Mt. Emma to left of Gilpin Peak (viewed from Mt. Sneffels)

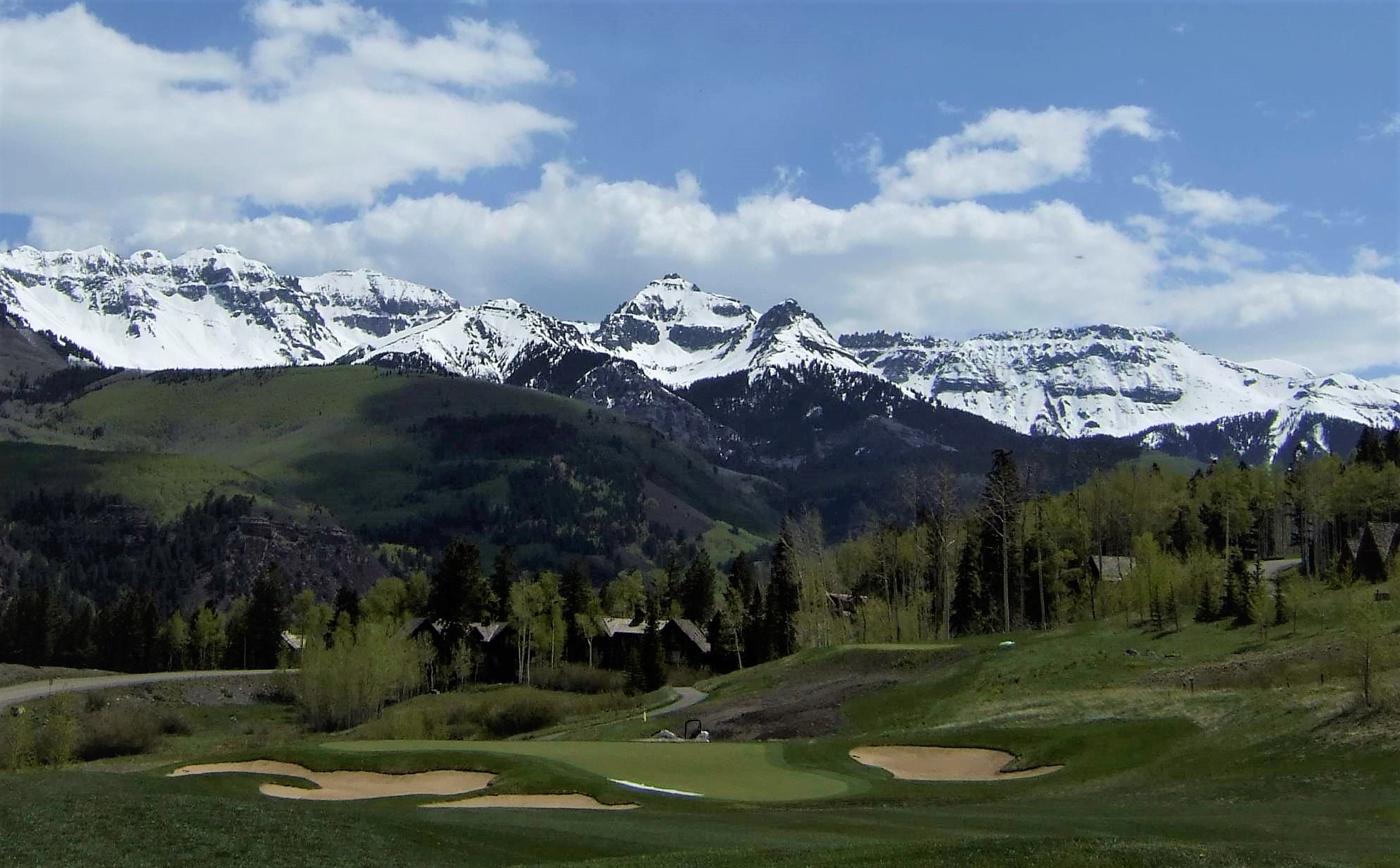
Mount Emma (centered) seen from golf course looking northeast

== See also ==
- Mountains of San Miguel County, Colorado
