= Potosi Peak =

Mountain in Colorado, United States

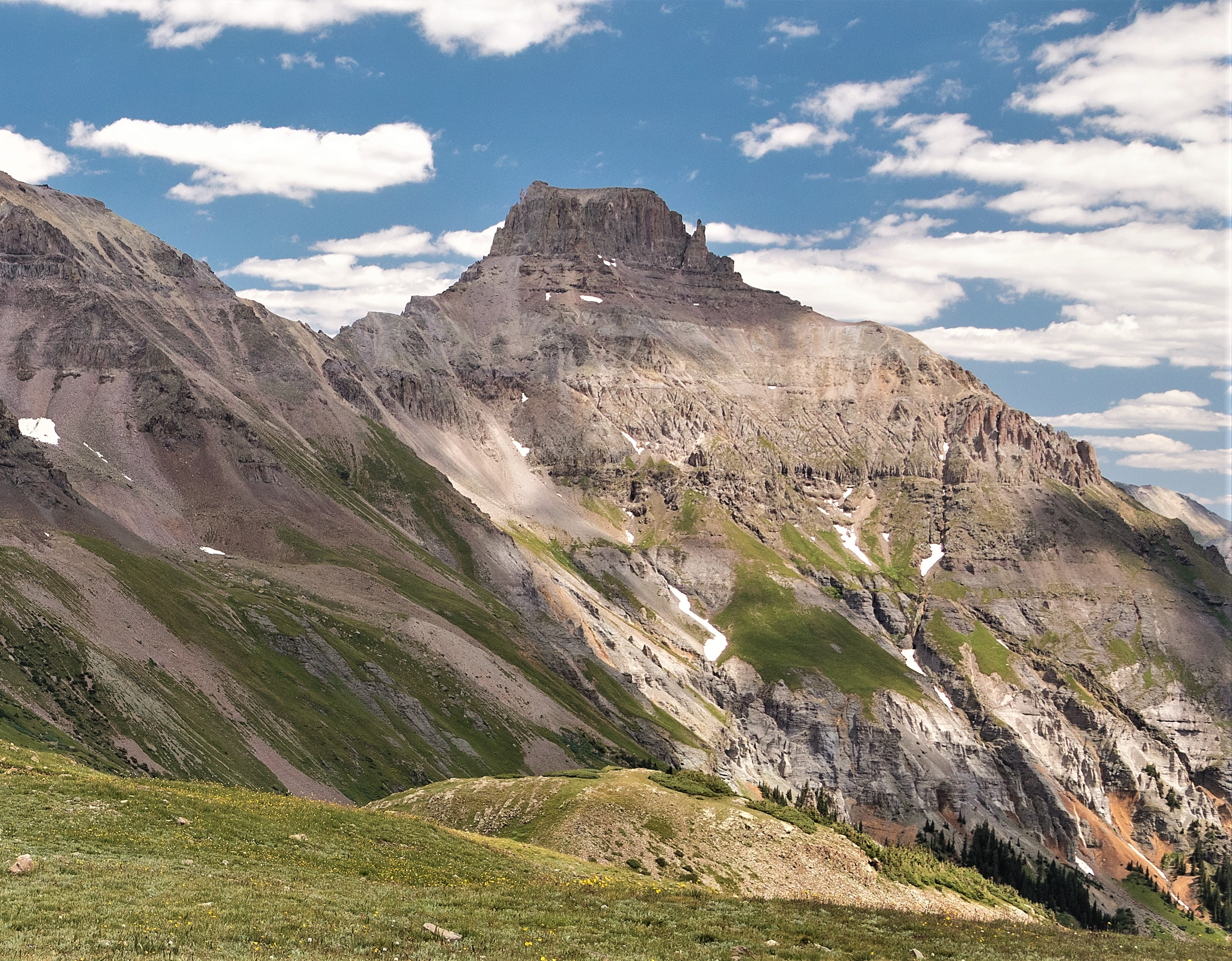
- Southwest aspect

Highest point
- Elevation: 13,786 ft (4,202 m)
- Prominence: 786 ft (240 m)
- Parent peak: Teakettle Mountain (13,825 ft)
- Isolation: 1.02 mi (1.64 km)
- Coordinates: 37°59′23″N 107°44′57″W

Geography
- Location within Colorado Location within the United States
- Location: Ouray County; Colorado, US
- Parent range: Rocky Mountains; San Juan Mountains; Sneffels Range
- Topo map: USGS Ironton

Geology
- Rock type: Extrusive rock

Climbing
- Easiest route: class 2+ scrambling

Potosi Peak is a 13,786-foot-elevation (4,202-meter) mountain summit located in Ouray County of Colorado, United States. It is situated five miles southwest of the community of Ouray, on land managed by Uncompahgre National Forest. It is part of the Sneffels Range which is a subset of the San Juan Mountains, which in turn is part of the Rocky Mountains. It is situated west of the Continental Divide, 2.2 miles south of Whitehouse Mountain, and 2.5 miles southeast of Mount Sneffels. Potosi ranks as the 113th-highest peak in Colorado, and the fourth-highest in the Sneffels Range. Recreation enthusiasts heading for Yankee Boy Basin traverse below the southern base of the mountain. Topographic relief is significant as the southeast aspect rises 4,000 feet (1,200 meters) above the Camp Bird Mine in approximately 1.5 mile. The mining activity in the immediate area produced significant amounts of gold and silver. "Potosi" in Quechuan language translates to "great wealth.". The mountain's name, which has been officially adopted by the United States Board on Geographic Names, was in use before 1899 when Henry Gannett published it in A Dictionary of Altitudes in the United States.

== Climate ==
According to the Köppen climate classification system, Potosi Peak is located in an alpine subarctic climate zone with long, cold, snowy winters, and cool to warm summers. Due to its altitude, it receives precipitation all year, as snow in winter, and as thunderstorms in summer, with a dry period in late spring. Precipitation runoff from the mountain drains into tributaries of the Uncompahgre River.

== Gallery ==
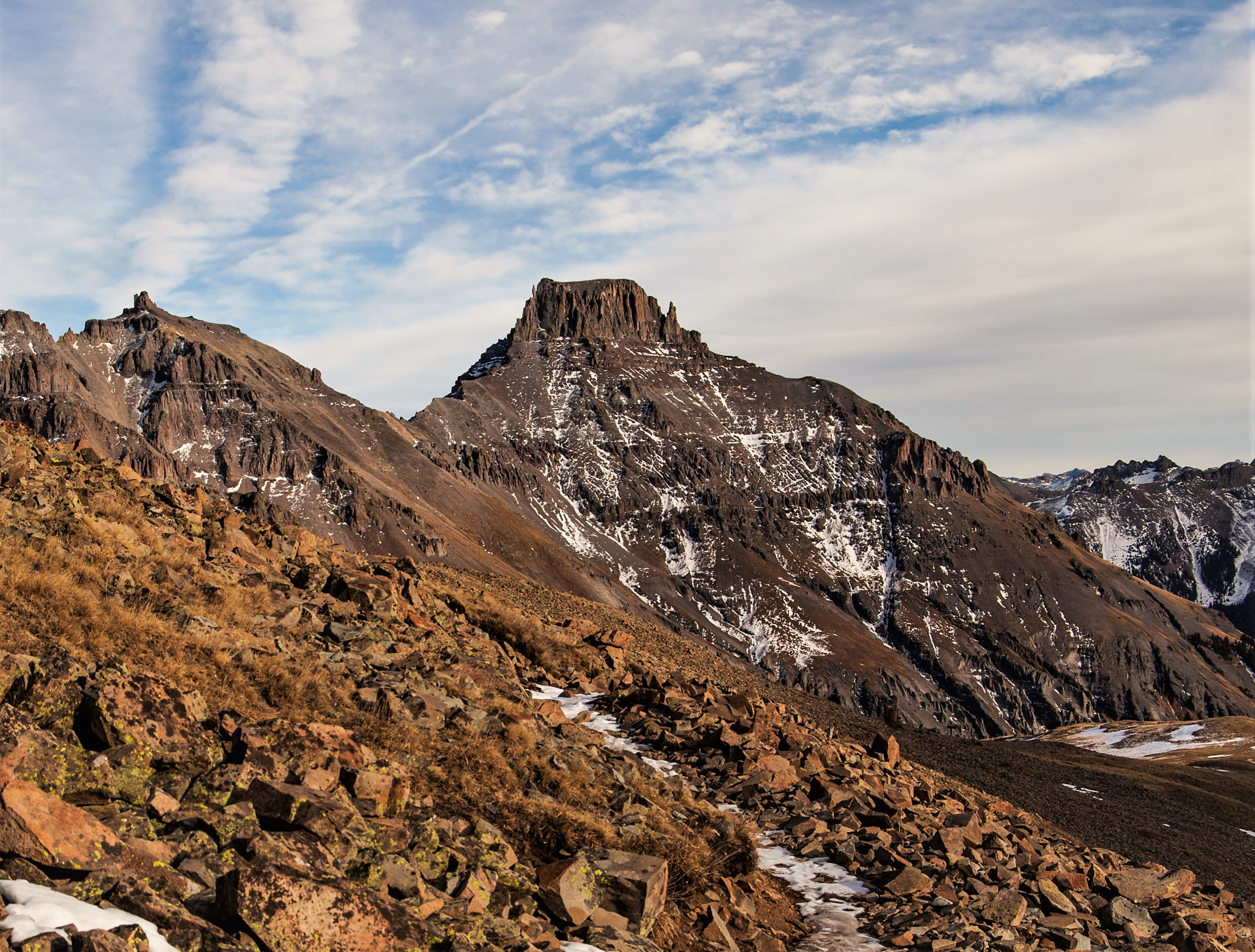

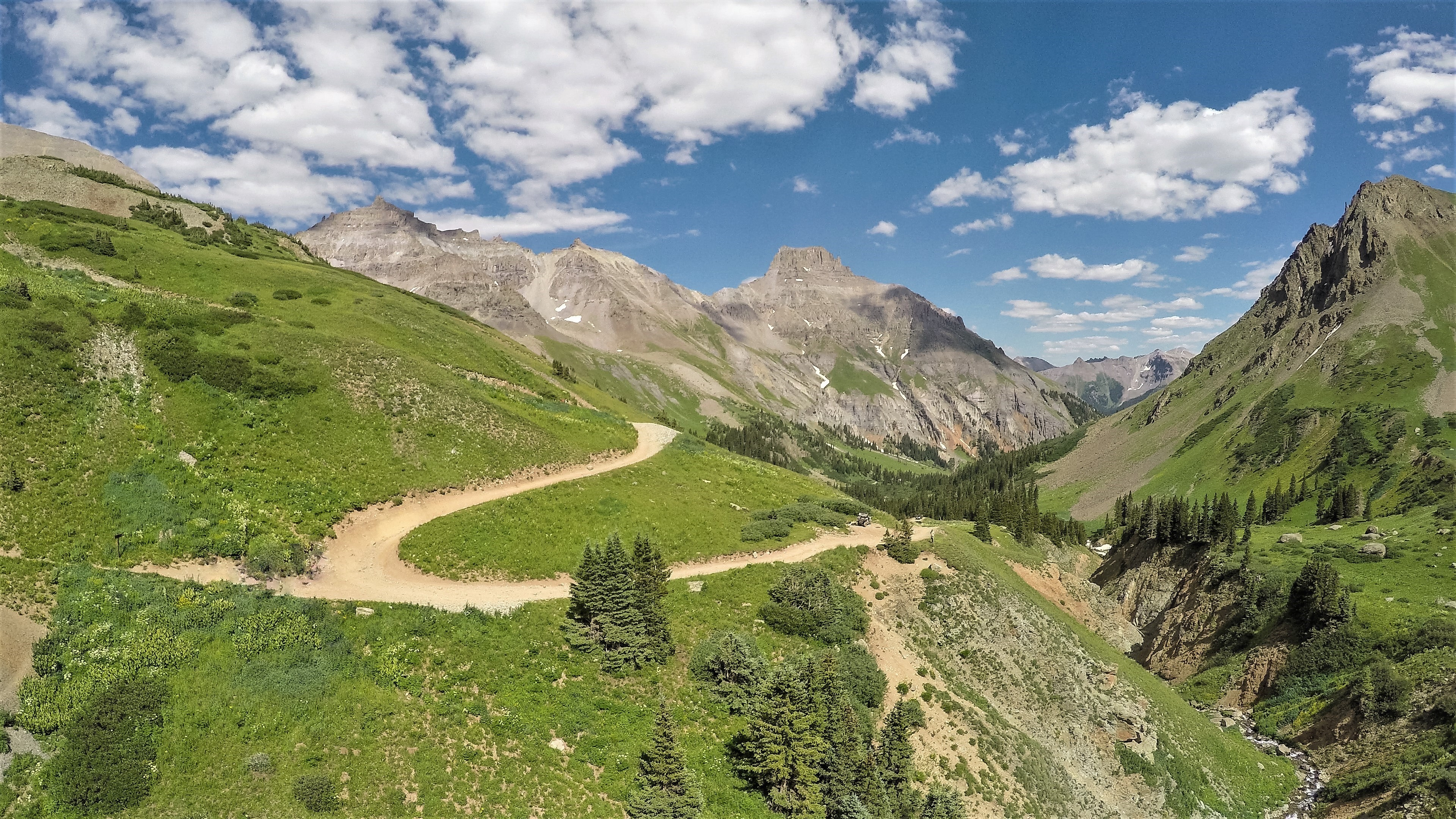
Potosi Peak centered, Teakettle Mountain to left

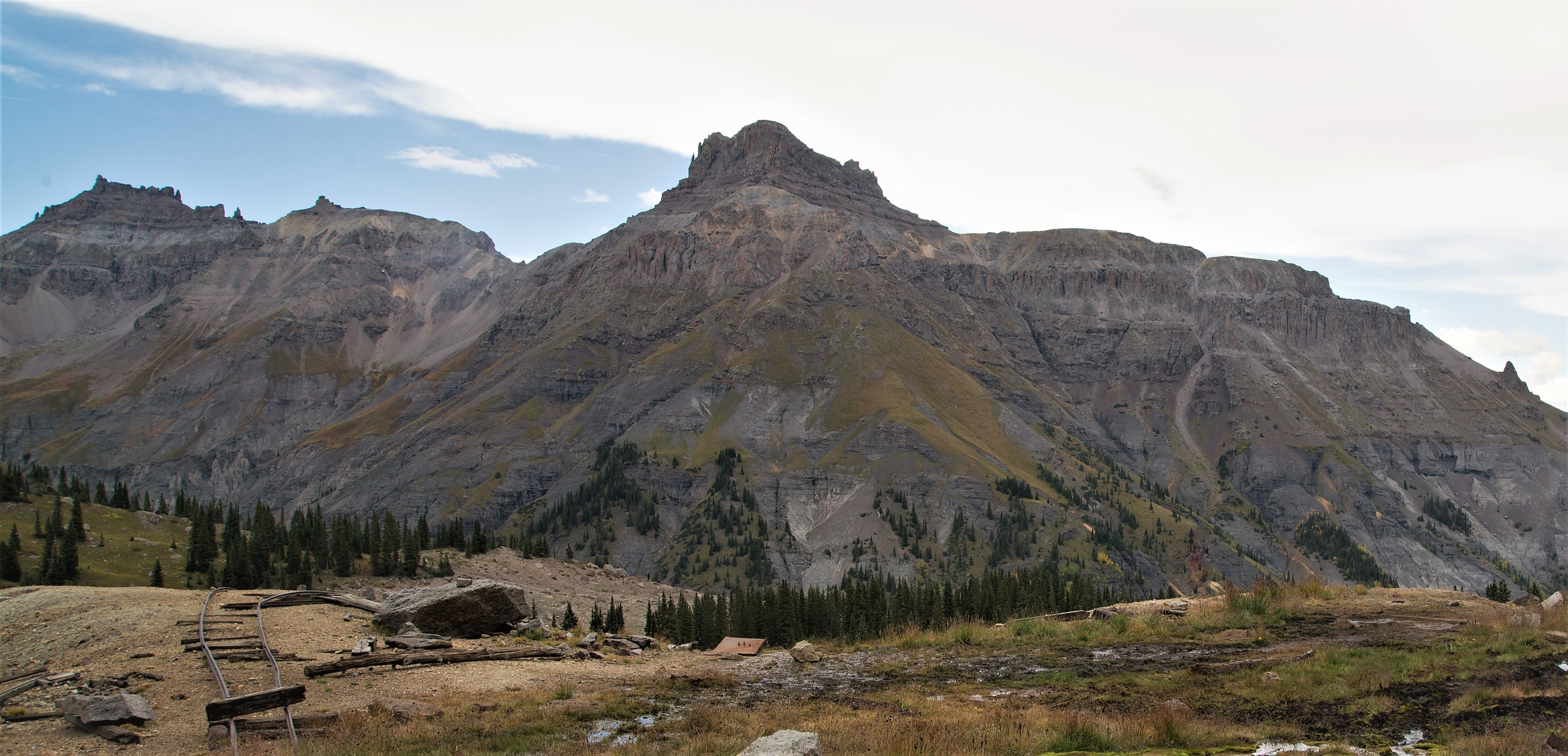
South aspect of Potosi Peak seen from Sidney Basin area.
Teakettle Mountain at left edge of frame.

== See also ==
- Mountains of Ouray County, Colorado
