= Dallas Peak =

Mountain in Colorado, United States

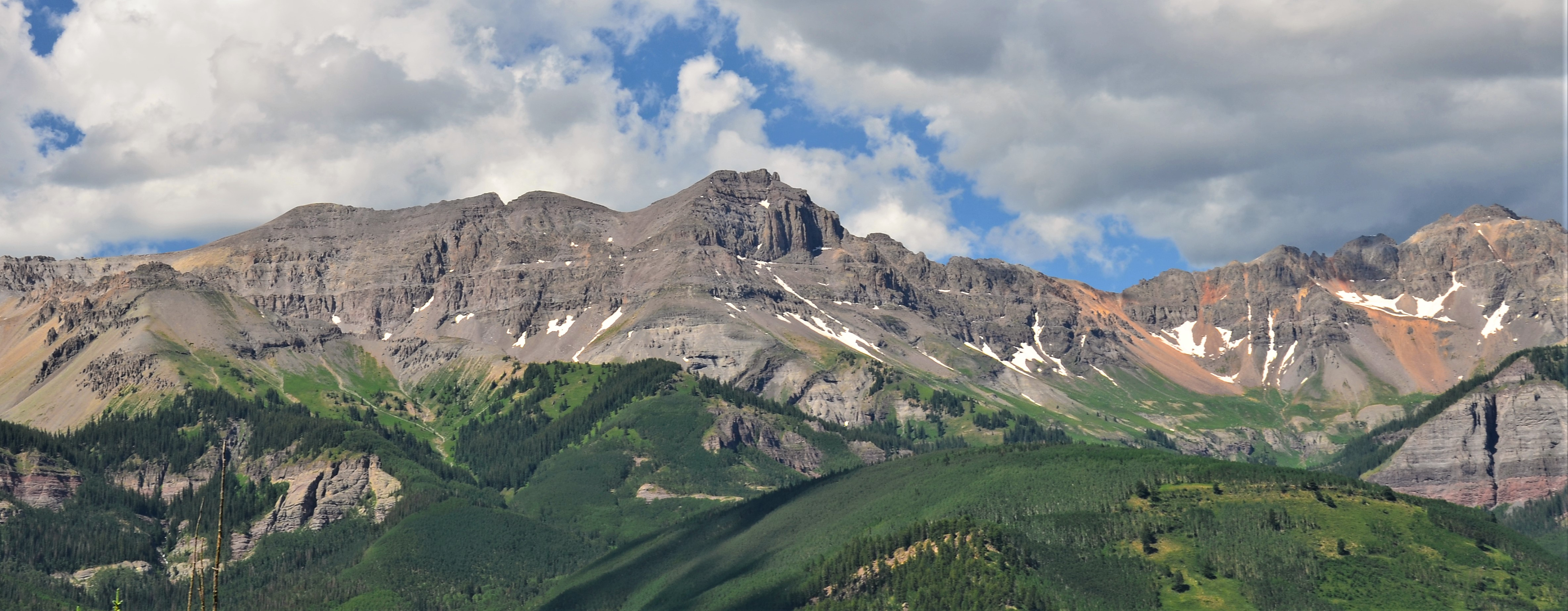
- South aspect

Highest point
- Elevation: 13,815 ft (4,211 m)
- Prominence: 869 ft (265 m)
- Parent peak: Mount Sneffels
- Isolation: 2.02 mi (3.25 km)
- Coordinates: 37°59′17″N 107°49′25″W

Naming
- Etymology: George M. Dallas

Geography
- Location within Colorado
- Location: Ouray and San Miguel counties, Colorado, United States
- Parent range: San Juan Mountains, Sneffels Range
- Topo map(s): USGS 7.5' topographic map Telluride, Colorado

Dallas Peak is a high mountain summit in the Sneffels Range of the Rocky Mountains of North America. The 13,815-foot (4,211 m) thirteener is located in the Mount Sneffels Wilderness of Uncompahgre National Forest, 3.3 miles (5.3 km) north by west (bearing 354°) of the Town of Telluride, Colorado, United States, on the drainage divide between Ouray and San Miguel counties.

== Etymology ==
This mountain's name was officially adopted by the U.S. Board on Geographic Names to commemorate George M. Dallas (1792–1864), American politician and diplomat who served as mayor of Philadelphia from 1828 to 1829, and as the 11th vice president of the United States from 1845 to 1849.

== Climate ==
According to the Köppen climate classification system, Dallas Peak is located in an alpine subarctic climate zone with long, cold, snowy winters, and cool to warm summers. Due to its altitude, it receives precipitation all year, as snow in winter, and as thunderstorms in summer, with a dry period in late spring. Precipitation runoff from the mountain drains south into the San Miguel River, and north to the Uncompahgre River via Dallas Creek.

== Gallery ==
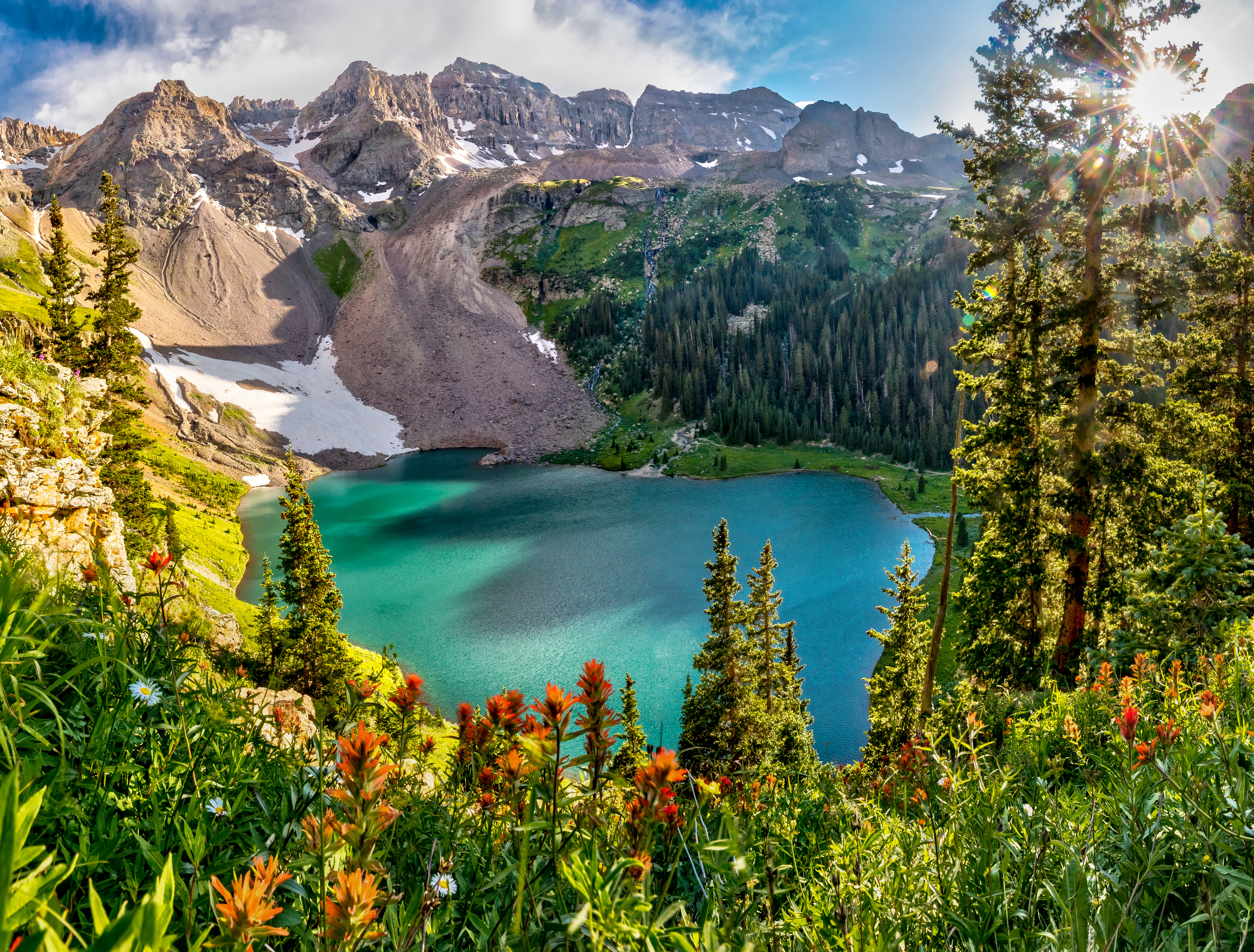
Dallas Peak seen with Blue Lakes

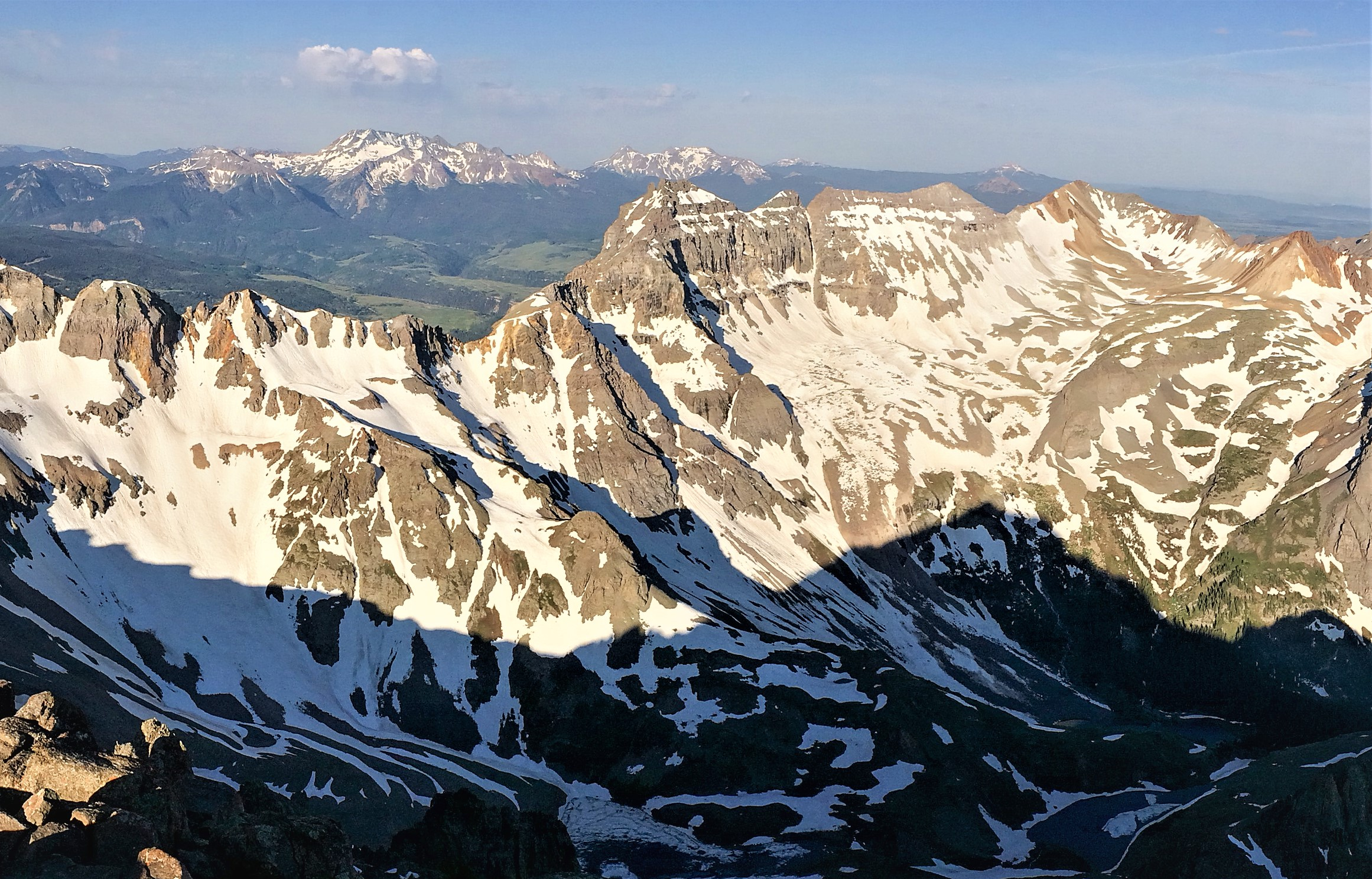
Dallas Peak seen from Mt. Sneffels

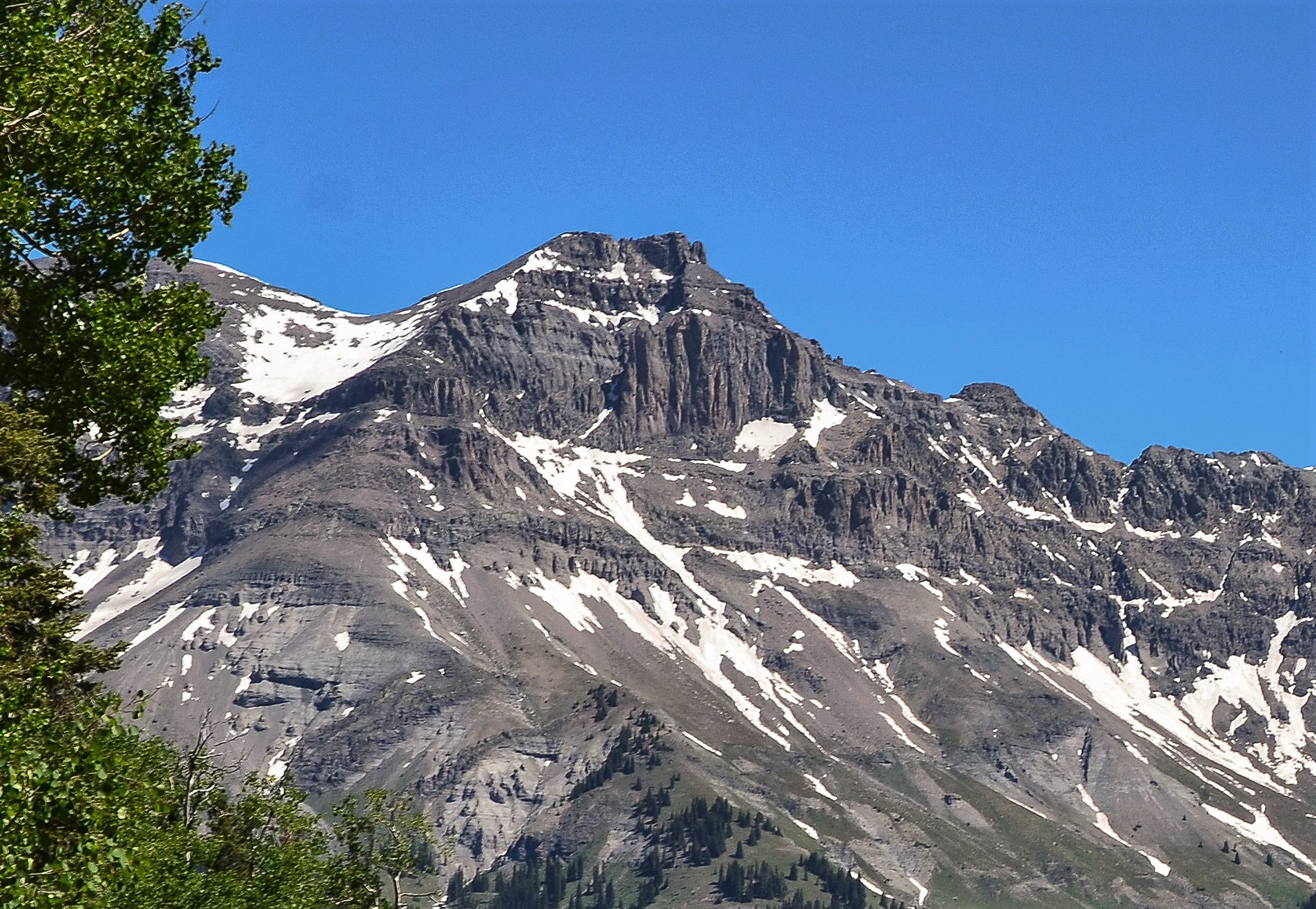

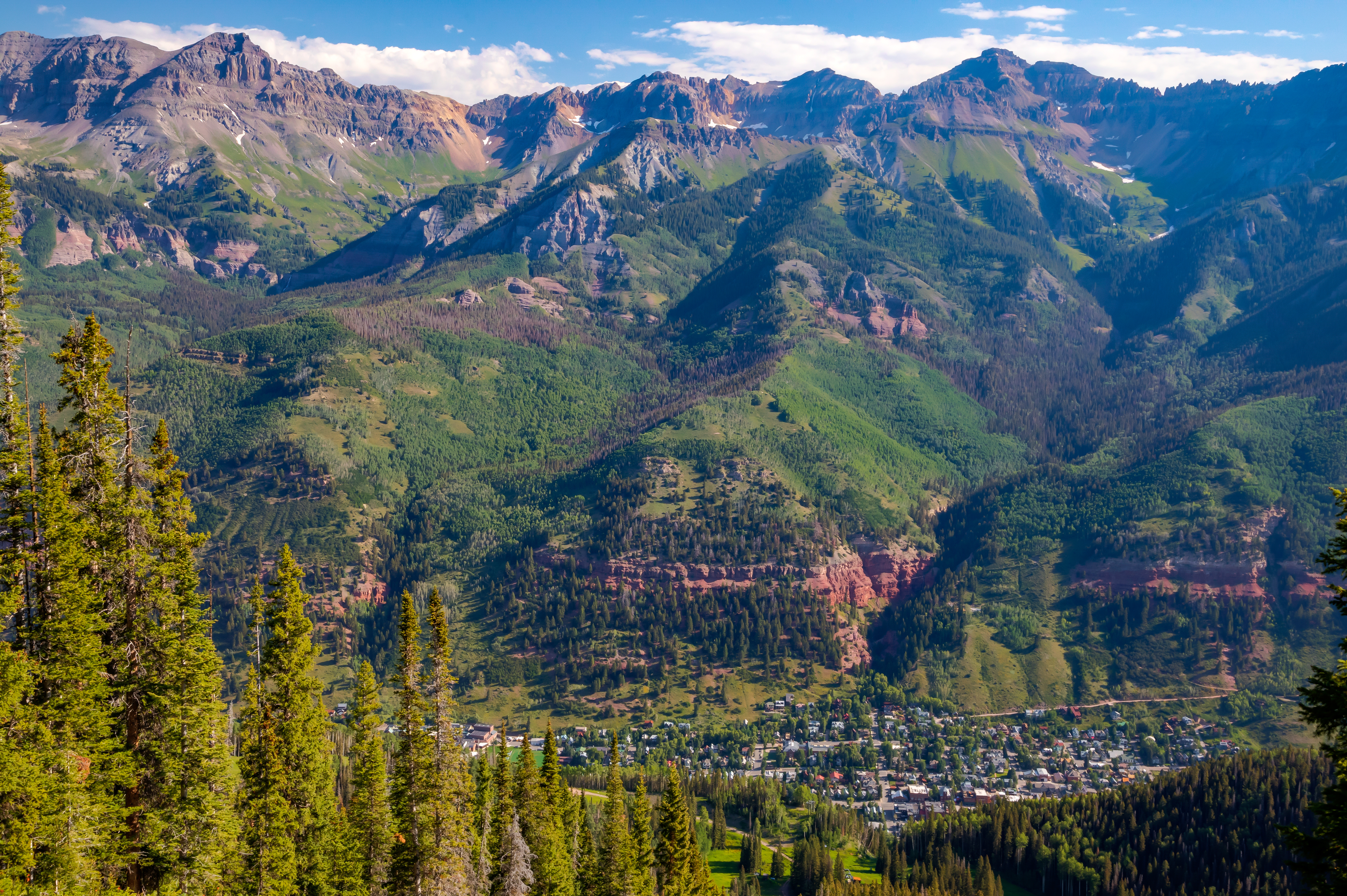
Dallas Peak in upper left corner, Telluride below.

== See also ==
- List of Colorado mountain ranges
- List of Colorado mountain summits
  - List of Colorado fourteeners
  - List of Colorado 4000 meter prominent summits
  - List of the most prominent summits of Colorado
- List of Colorado county high points
