= Sneffels Range =

Mountain range in Colorado, United States

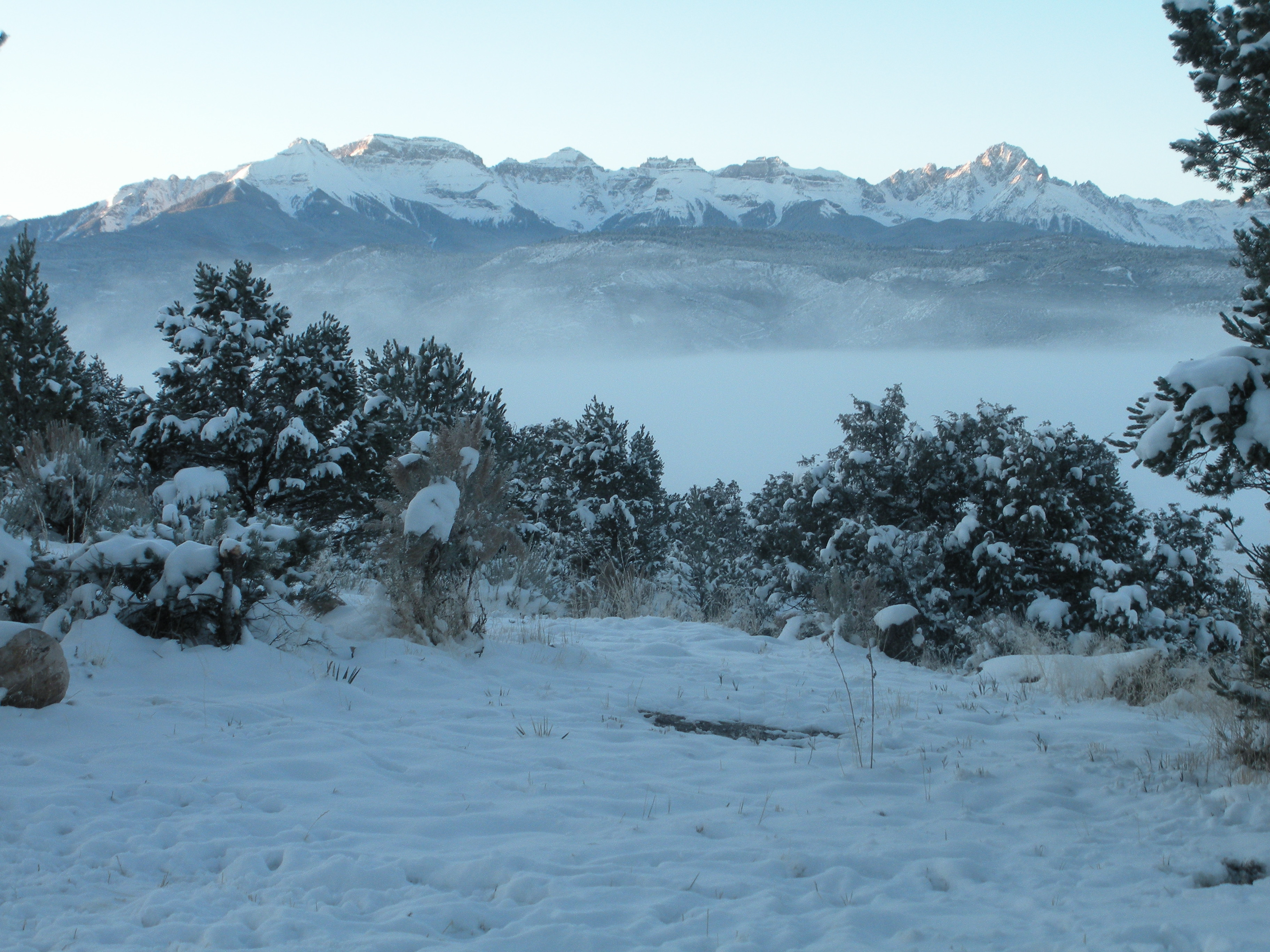
- Sneffels Range

Highest point
- Peak: Mount Sneffels
- Elevation: 14,158 ft (4,315 m)
- Listing: Mountain ranges of Colorado
- Coordinates: 38°00′12″N 107°47′32″W

Geography
- Location within Colorado
- Country: United States
- State: Colorado
- Parent range: San Juan Mountains, Rocky Mountains

The Sneffels Range, regionally conterminous with San Juans, is a young, prominent, and rugged range of mountains in southwestern Colorado of the San Juan Mountains. The Sneffels range form the southern border of Ouray County and run west to east.

== Prominence ==
The Sneffels Range can be viewed from as far as the La Sal Mountains in eastern Utah and is very prominent from most vantage points of the Uncompahgre Valley. The most prominent peak of the Sneffels Range is Mount Sneffels reaching 14,158 feet (4,315 m).

- Mount Sneffels 14,158 ft
- Teakettle Mountain 13,819 ft
- Dallas Peak 13,809 ft
- Potosi Peak 13,786 ft
- Gilpin Peak 13,694 ft
- Cirque Mountain 13,686 ft
- Mount Emma 13,581 ft
- Mears Peak 13,496 ft
- Whitehouse Mountain 13,492 ft
- Mount Ridgway 13,468 ft
- Chicago Peak 13,385 ft
- Campbell Peak 13,213 ft
- United States Mountain 13,036 ft
- Hayden Peak 12,987 ft
- Stony Mountain 12,698 ft

== See also ==
- Cimarron Ridge
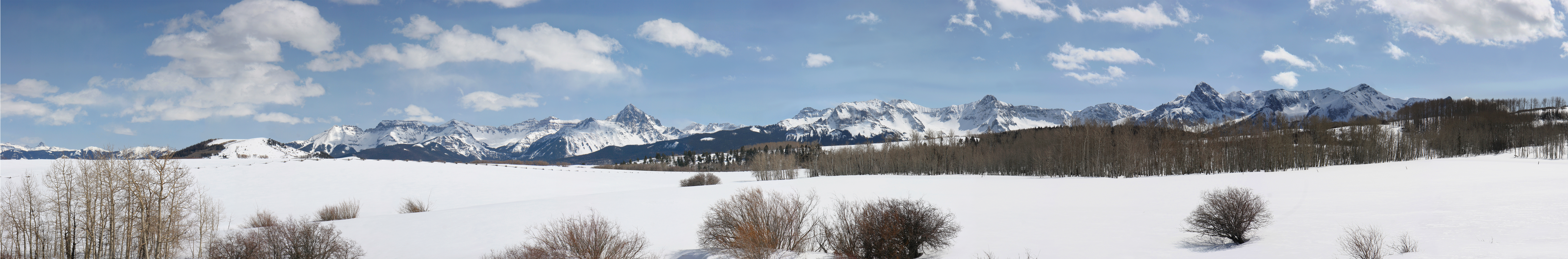
Panorama of the Sneffels sub range of the San Juan Mountains, photographed from Dallas Divide pass.
