= Whitehouse Mountain =

Mountain in Ouray County, Colorado

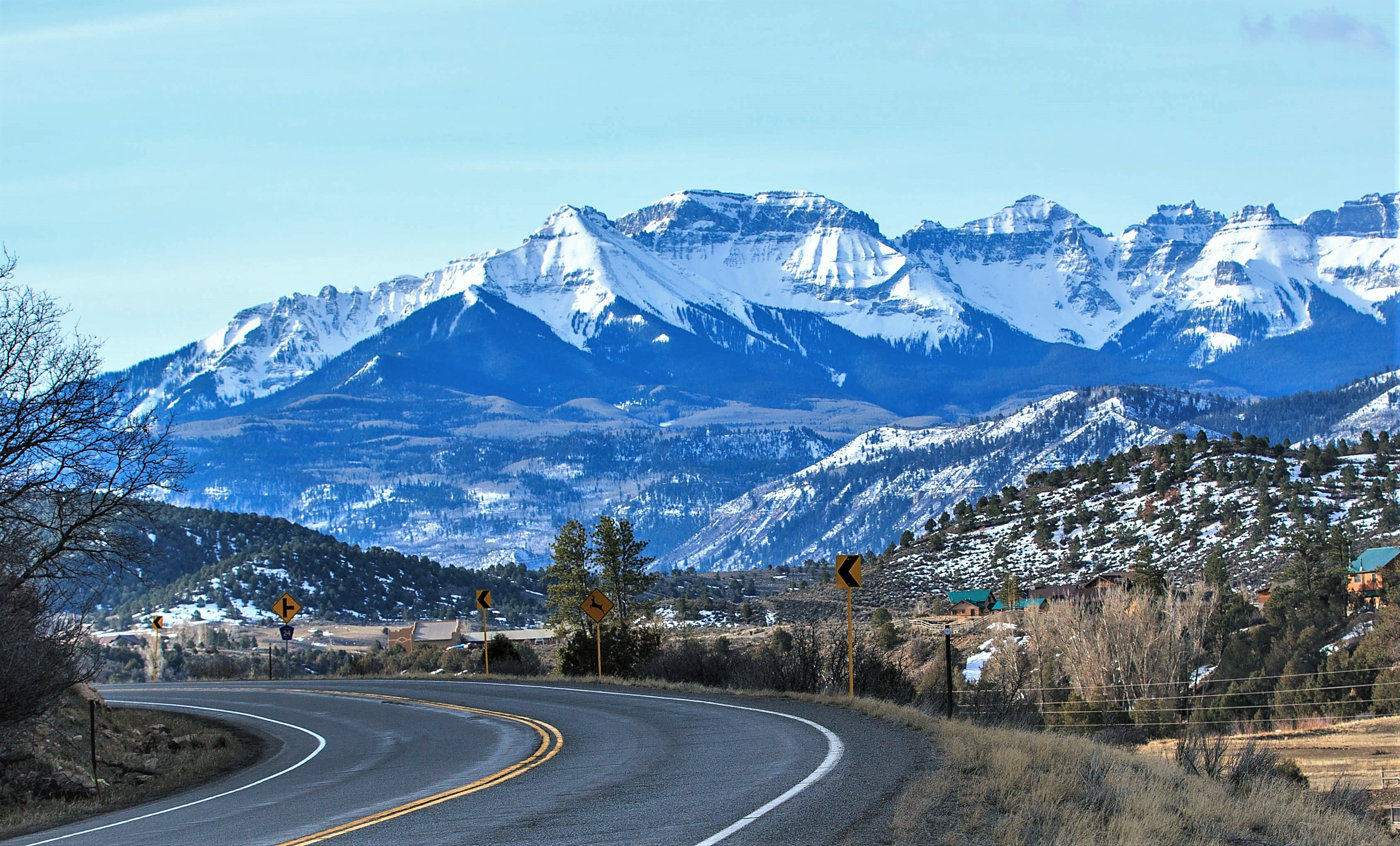
- North aspect (center) from Highway 550

Highest point
- Elevation: 13,492 ft (4,112 m)
- Prominence: 572 ft (174 m)
- Parent peak: Teakettle Mountain (13,825 ft)
- Isolation: 1.88 mi (3.03 km)
- Coordinates: 38°01′13″N 107°44′17″W

Geography
- Location within Colorado Location within the United States
- Location: Ouray County; Colorado, US
- Parent range: Rocky Mountains; San Juan Mountains; Sneffels Range
- Topo map: USGS Ouray

Geology
- Rock type: Extrusive rock

Climbing
- Easiest route: class 2 hiking

Whitehouse Mountain is a 13,492-foot-elevation (4,112-meter) mountain summit located in Ouray County of southwest Colorado, United States. It is situated four miles west of the community of Ouray, on land managed by Uncompahgre National Forest. It is part of the Sneffels Range which is a subset of the San Juan Mountains, which in turn is part of the Rocky Mountains. It is west of the Continental Divide, 2.2 miles north of Potosi Peak, and 3.2 miles east-northeast of Mount Sneffels. Topographic relief is significant as the east aspect rises 5,680 feet (1,730 meters) above the town of Ouray in approximately four miles. The mountain's name, which has been officially adopted by the United States Board on Geographic Names, was in use before 1906 when Henry Gannett published it in the Gazetteer of Colorado.

== Climate ==
According to the Köppen climate classification system, Whitehouse Mountain is located in an alpine subarctic climate zone with long, cold, snowy winters, and cool to warm summers. Due to its altitude, it receives precipitation all year, as snow in winter, and as thunderstorms in summer, with a dry period in late spring. Precipitation runoff from the mountain drains into tributaries of the Uncompahgre River.

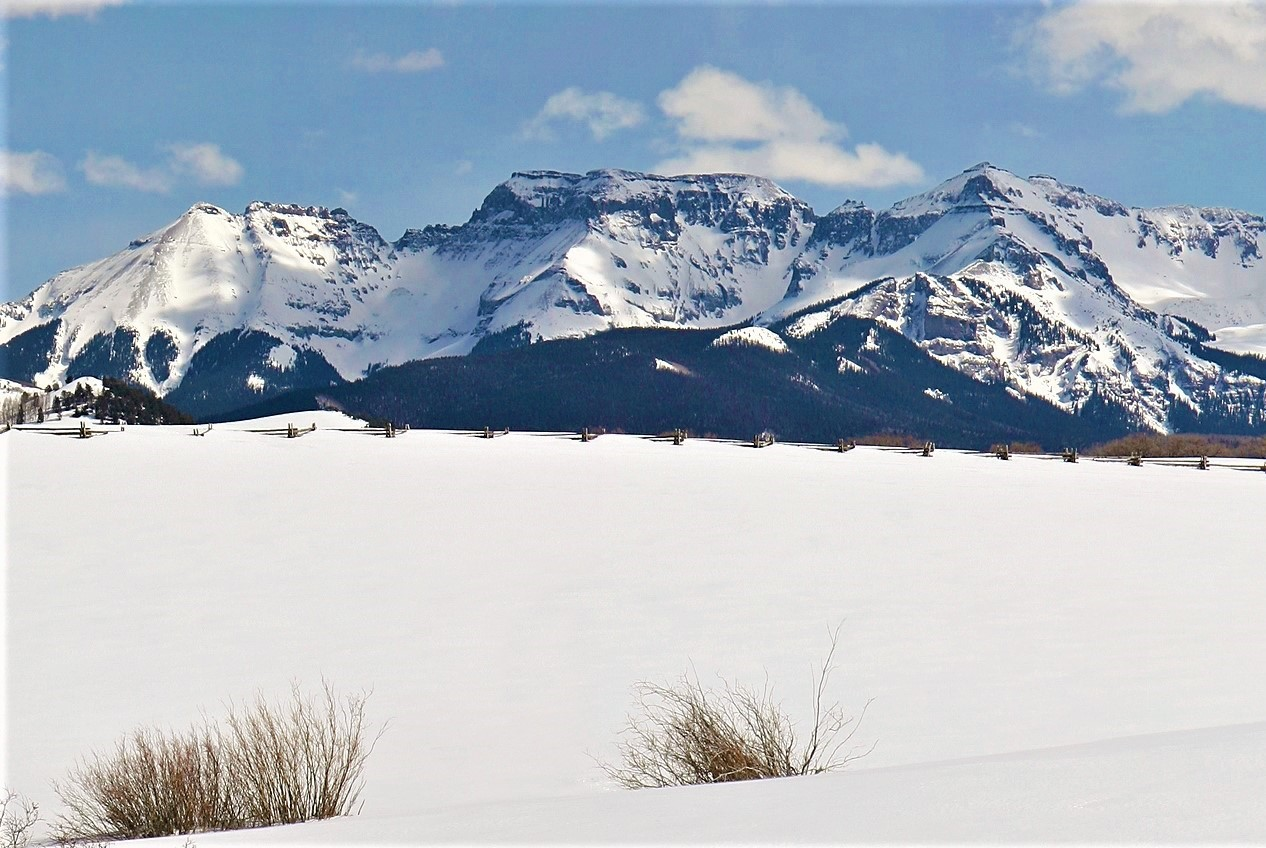
Whitehouse Mountain centered, from NW. (Mt. Ridgway on the right)

== See also ==
- Mountains of Ouray County, Colorado
