= Colorado State Highway 62 =

State highway in Colorado, United States

State Highway 62
- SH 62 highlighted in red

Route information
- Maintained by CDOT
- Length: 23.41 mi (37.67 km)

Major junctions
- West end: SH 145 at Placerville
- East end: US 550 at Ridgway

Location
- Country: United States
- State: Colorado
- Counties: San Miguel, Ouray

Highway system
- Colorado State Highway System; Interstate; US; State; Scenic
← SH 61	→ SH 63

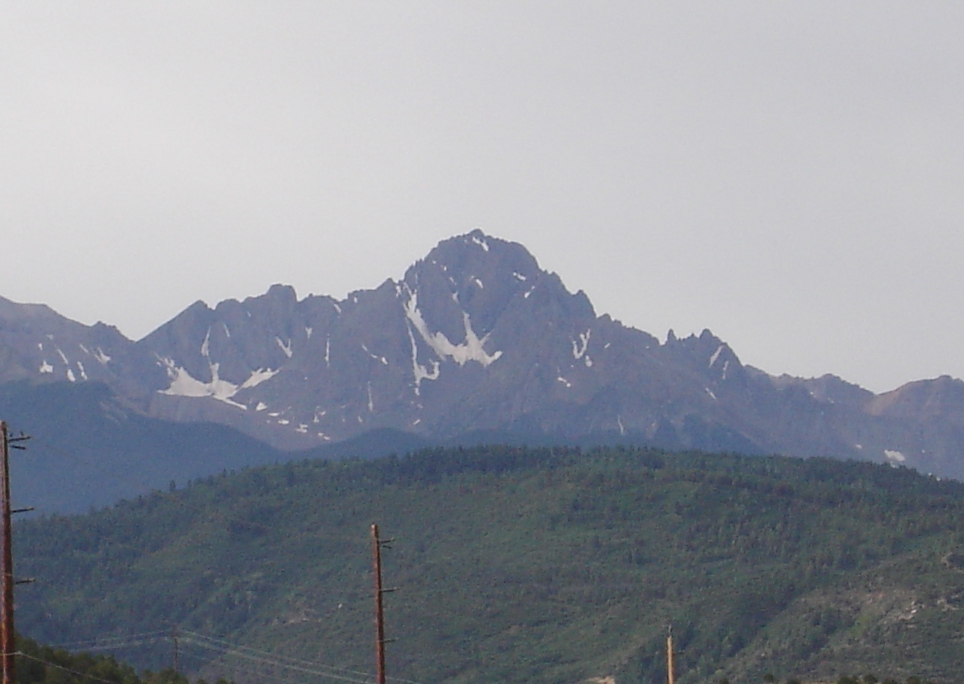
Mount Sneffels from SH 62

State Highway 62 (SH 62) is a 23.41-mile-long (37.67 km) state highway in the U.S. state of Colorado. SH 62's western terminus is at SH 145 in Placerville, and the eastern terminus is at U.S. Route 550 (US 550) in Ridgway.

== Route description ==
SH 62 starts at a junction with SH 145 just north of Placerville, Colorado in the San Miguel River valley and heads northeast up the Leopard Creek Canyon. The highway bends slowly to the east before crossing the Dallas Divide at an elevation of 8,983 feet (2,738 m). It then follows Cottonwood and Dallas creeks downstream to Ridgway, Colorado. The highway crosses the Uncompahgre River just before ending at a junction with US 550.

State Highway 62 is part of the San Juan Skyway, designated as a National Scenic Byway in 1996.

== Major intersections ==
County	Location	mi	km	Destinations	Notes
San Miguel	Placerville	0.000	0.000	SH 145 – Norwood, Telluride	Western terminus
Ouray	Ridgway	23.414	37.681	US 550	Eastern terminus
1.000 mi = 1.609 km; 1.000 km = 0.621 mi
