= Mount Ridgway =

Mountain in Colorado, United States

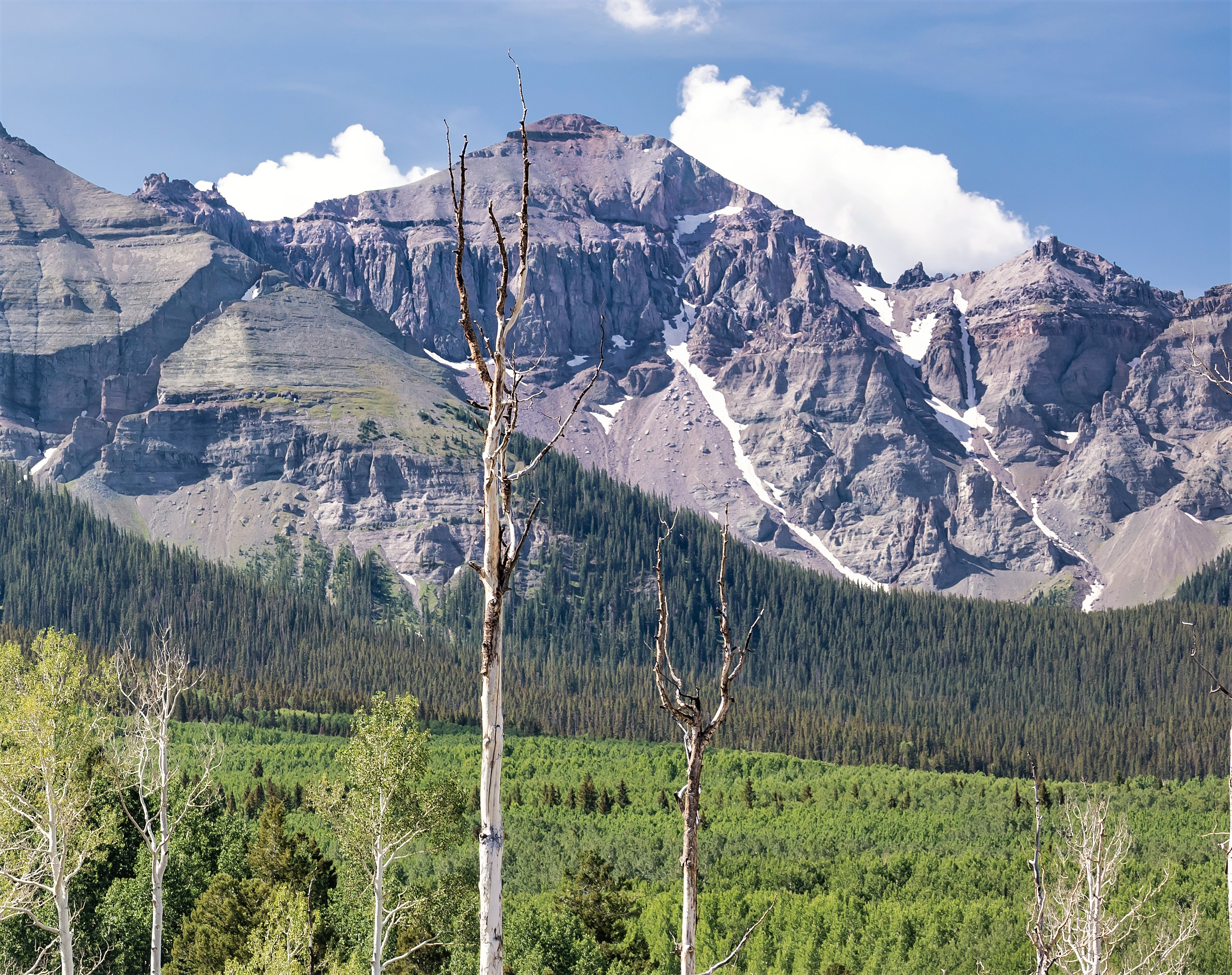
- North aspect

Highest point
- Elevation: 13,468 ft (4,105 m)
- Prominence: 428 ft (130 m)
- Parent peak: Whitehouse Mountain (13,492 ft)
- Isolation: 0.94 mi (1.51 km)
- Coordinates: 38°00′49″N 107°45′11″W

Naming
- Etymology: Robert M. Ridgway

Geography
- Location within Colorado Location within the United States
- Location: Ouray County; Colorado, US
- Parent range: Rocky Mountains; San Juan Mountains; Sneffels Range
- Topo map: USGS Mount Sneffels

Geology
- Rock type: Extrusive rock

Climbing
- Easiest route: class 2 hiking

Mount Ridgway is a 13,468-foot-elevation (4,105-meter) mountain summit located in Ouray County of southwest Colorado, United States. It is situated five miles west of the community of Ouray, on land managed by Uncompahgre National Forest. It is part of the Sneffels Range which is a subset of the San Juan Mountains, which in turn is part of the Rocky Mountains. It is west of the Continental Divide, 2.2 miles east-northeast of Mount Sneffels, and 0.95 miles southwest of Whitehouse Mountain, which is the nearest higher neighbor. Topographic relief is significant as the west aspect rises 3,000 feet (910 meters) above Blaine Basin in one mile.

== Etymology ==
This mountain, the nearby town of Ridgway, the Ridgway Dam, and Ridgway State Park trace their names to Denver & Rio Grande Railroad superintendent Robert Matthew Ridgway (1834–1908), who established the town in 1891. The mountain's name has been officially adopted by the United States Board on Geographic Names.

== Climate ==
According to the Köppen climate classification system, Mount Ridgway is located in an alpine subarctic climate zone with long, cold, snowy winters, and cool to warm summers. Due to its altitude, it receives precipitation all year, as snow in winter, and as thunderstorms in summer, with a dry period in late spring. Precipitation runoff from the mountain drains into tributaries of the Uncompahgre River.

== Gallery ==
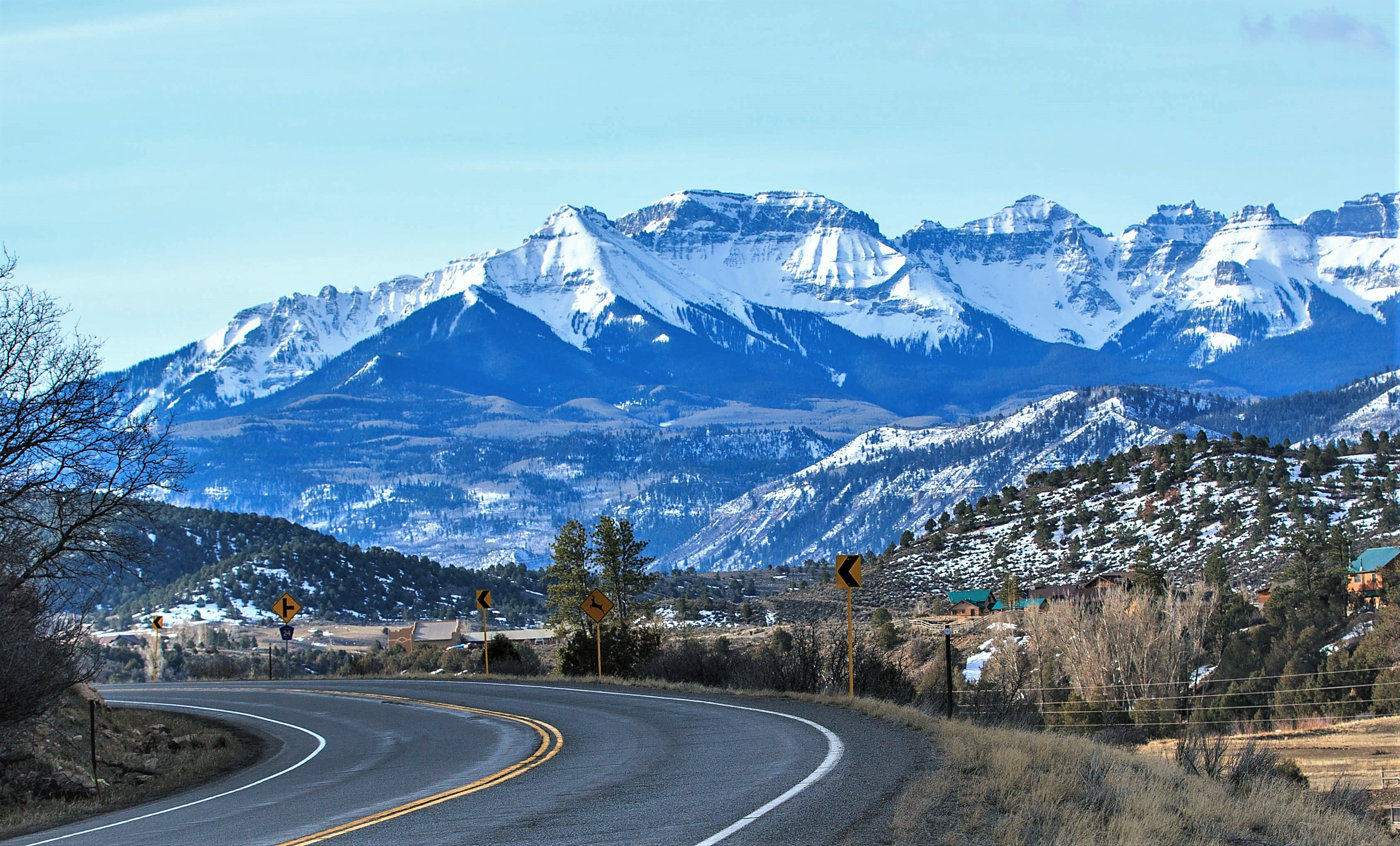
Whitehouse Mountain centered with Mt. Ridgway to immediate right, seen from Highway 550 near the town of Ridgway

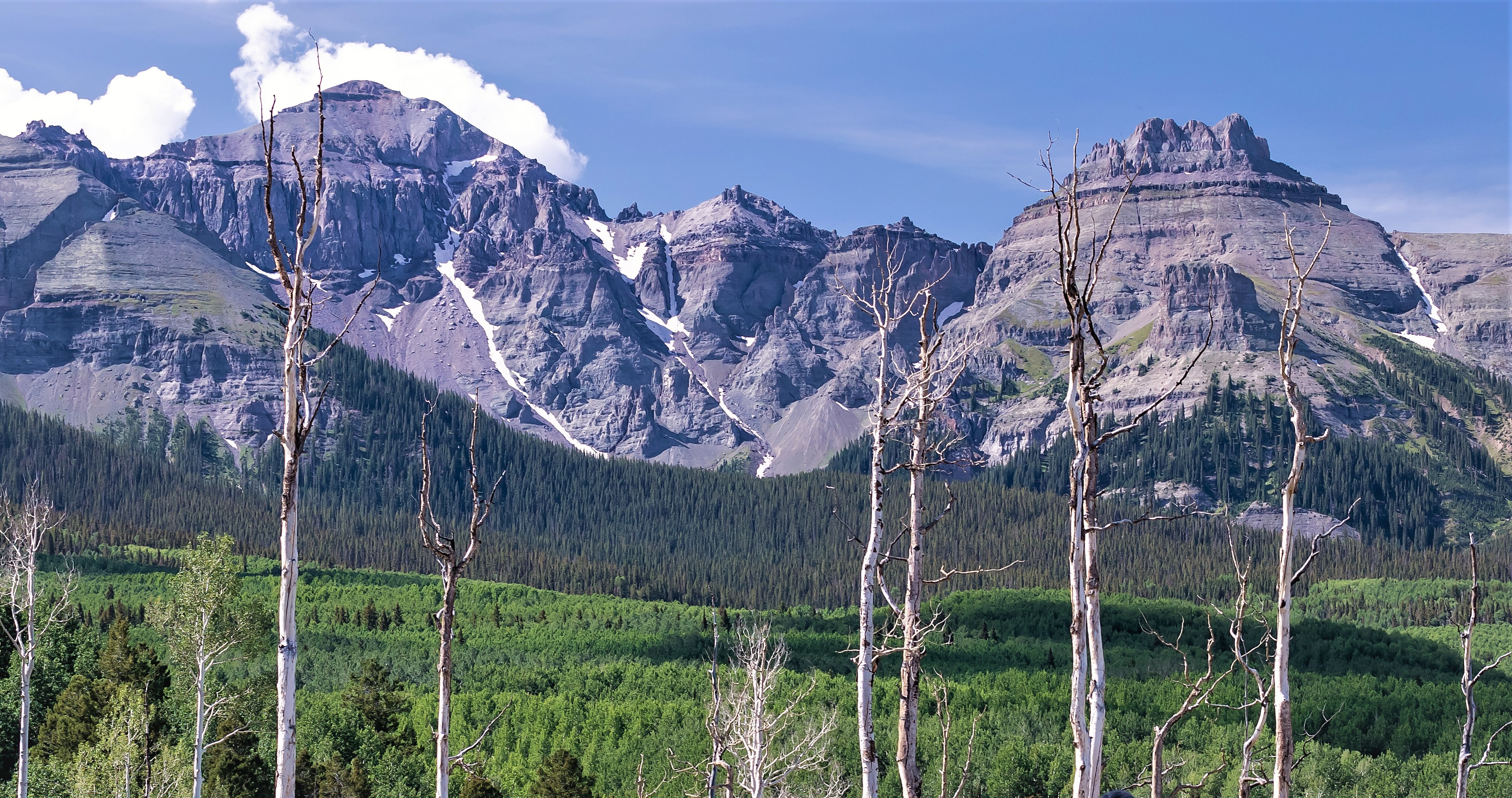
Mount Ridgway (left) and Reconnoiter Peak (right)

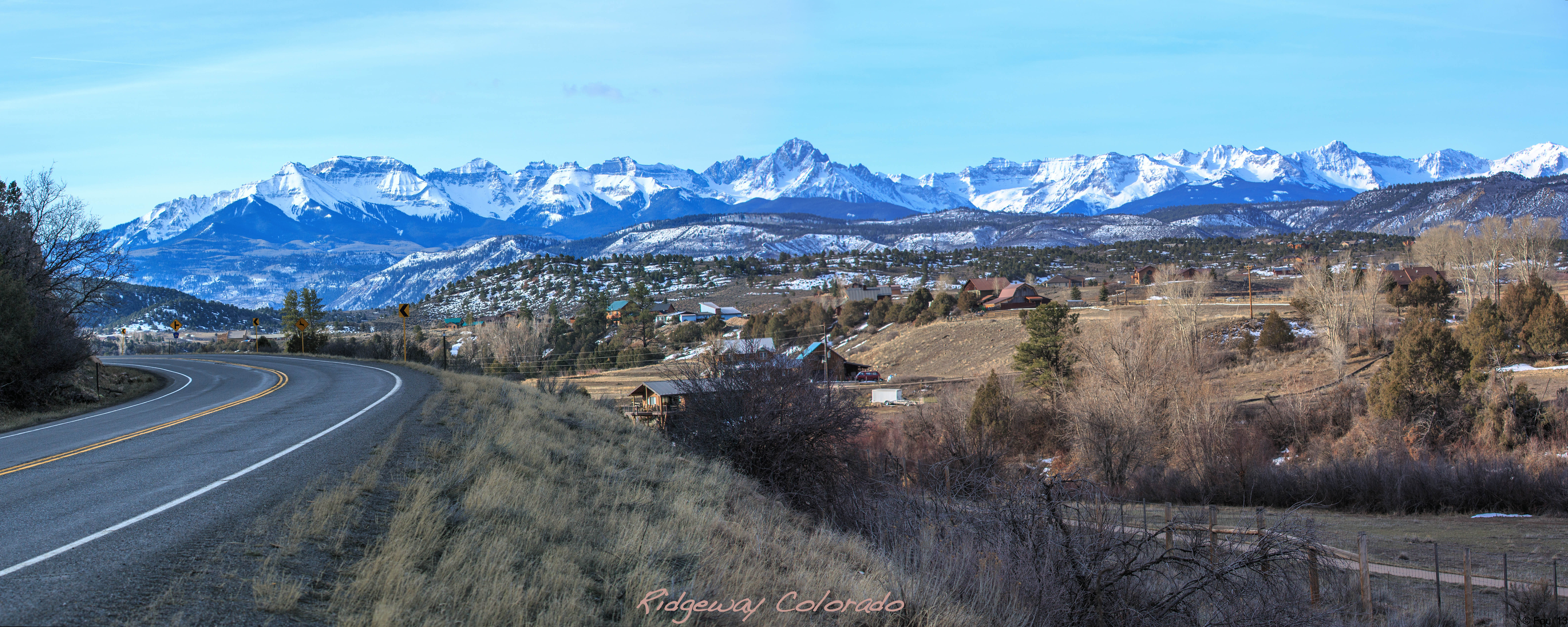
Sneffels Range with Mt. Ridgway to the left

== See also ==
- Mountains of Ouray County, Colorado
