= Dallas Divide =

Mountain pass in Colorado, USA

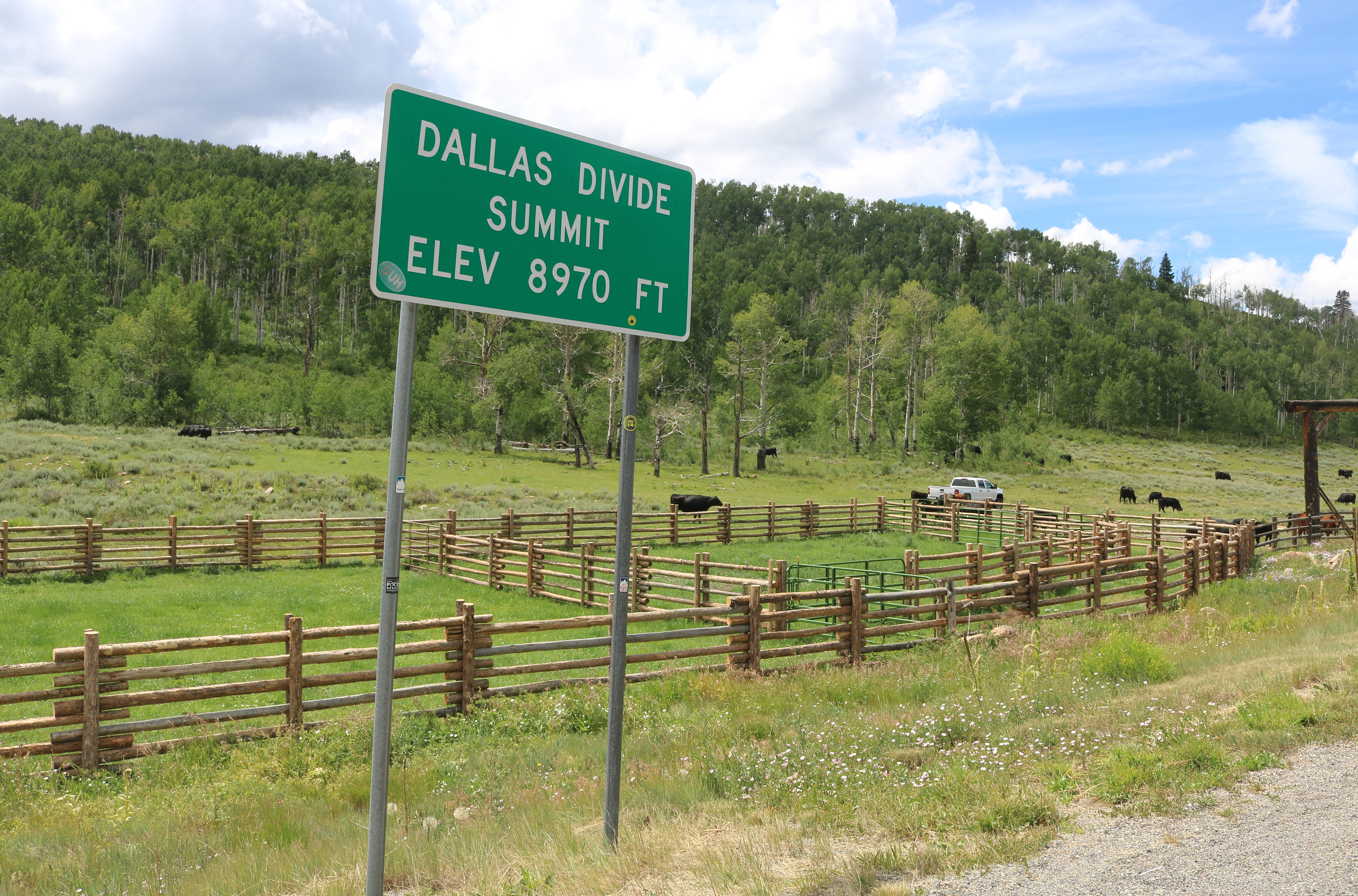
- The sign at the top of the pass
- Interactive map of Dallas Divide
- Elevation: 8,983 ft (2,738 m)
- Traversed by: State Highway 62

Third Approach
- Location: Ouray / San Miguel counties, Colorado, U.S.
- Range: San Juan Mountains/Uncompahgre Plateau
- Coordinates: 38°05′40″N 107°53′18″W
- Topo map: USGS Sams

Dallas Divide (el. 8,983 feet (2,738 m)) is a high mountain pass in the United States state of Colorado located on State Highway 62 about 12 miles (19 km) west of the town of Ridgway.

The pass is a saddle between the San Juan Mountains to the south and the Uncompahgre Plateau to the north and divides the Uncompahgre River watershed from the San Miguel River watershed and Ouray County from San Miguel County. The pass takes its name from Dallas Creek which drains the basin on the north side of Mount Sneffels into the Uncompahgre River. The divide's namesake is George M. Dallas, 11th Vice President of the United States.

== History ==
A toll road was first constructed over Dallas Divide in 1880 linking the town of Dallas near Ridgway with Telluride. In 1890 the Rio Grande Southern Railroad was built over the divide from Ridgway to Telluride. The Dallas Divide, Colorado, post office operated from May 24, 1894 to July 23, 1909.

== See also ==
- Category:Mountain passes of Colorado
- Ouray County, Colorado
- San Juan Mountains
- San Juan Skyway National Scenic Byway
- San Miguel County, Colorado
