= Gilpin Peak =

Mountain in Colorado, United States

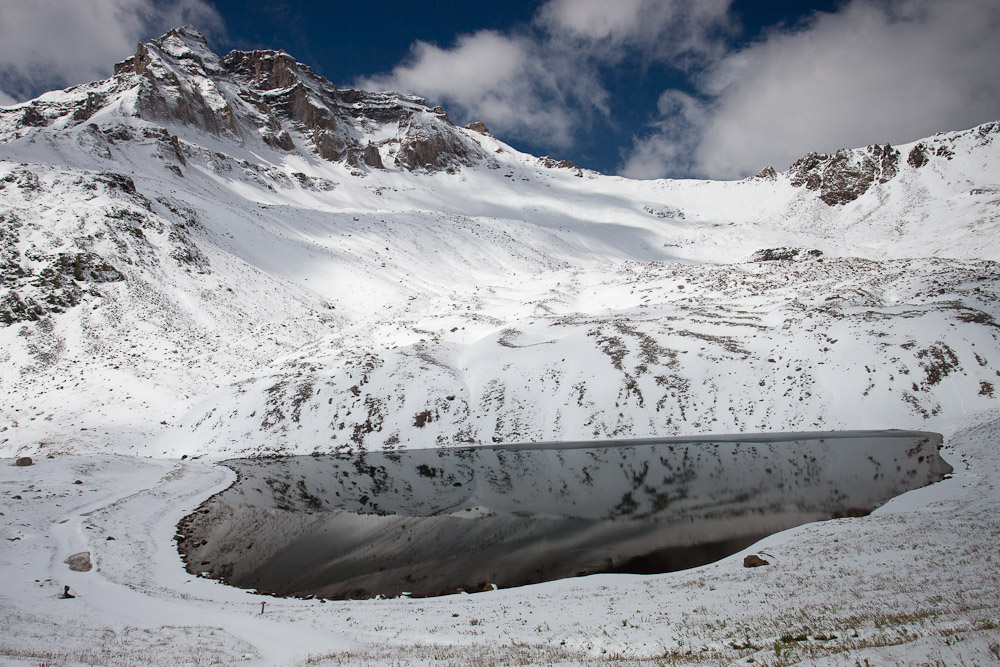
- Gilpin Peak and Wright Lake

Highest point
- Elevation: 13,700 ft (4,176 m)
- Prominence: 720 ft (219 m)
- Parent peak: Mount Sneffels
- Isolation: 1.20 mi (1.93 km)
- Coordinates: 37°59′12″N 107°47′35″W

Naming
- Etymology: William Gilpin

Geography
- Location within Colorado
- Location: Ouray and San Miguel counties, Colorado, United States
- Parent range: San Juan Mountains, Sneffels Range
- Topo map(s): USGS 7.5' topographic map Grays Peak, Colorado

Gilpin Peak is a high mountain summit in the Sneffels Range of the Rocky Mountains of North America. The 13,700-foot (4,176 m) thirteener is located in the Mount Sneffels Wilderness of Uncompahgre National Forest, 3.5 miles (5.6 km) north-northeast (bearing 23°) of the Town of Telluride, Colorado, United States, on the drainage divide between Ouray County and San Miguel County. Gilpin Peak was named in honor of William Gilpin, the first Governor of the Territory of Colorado.

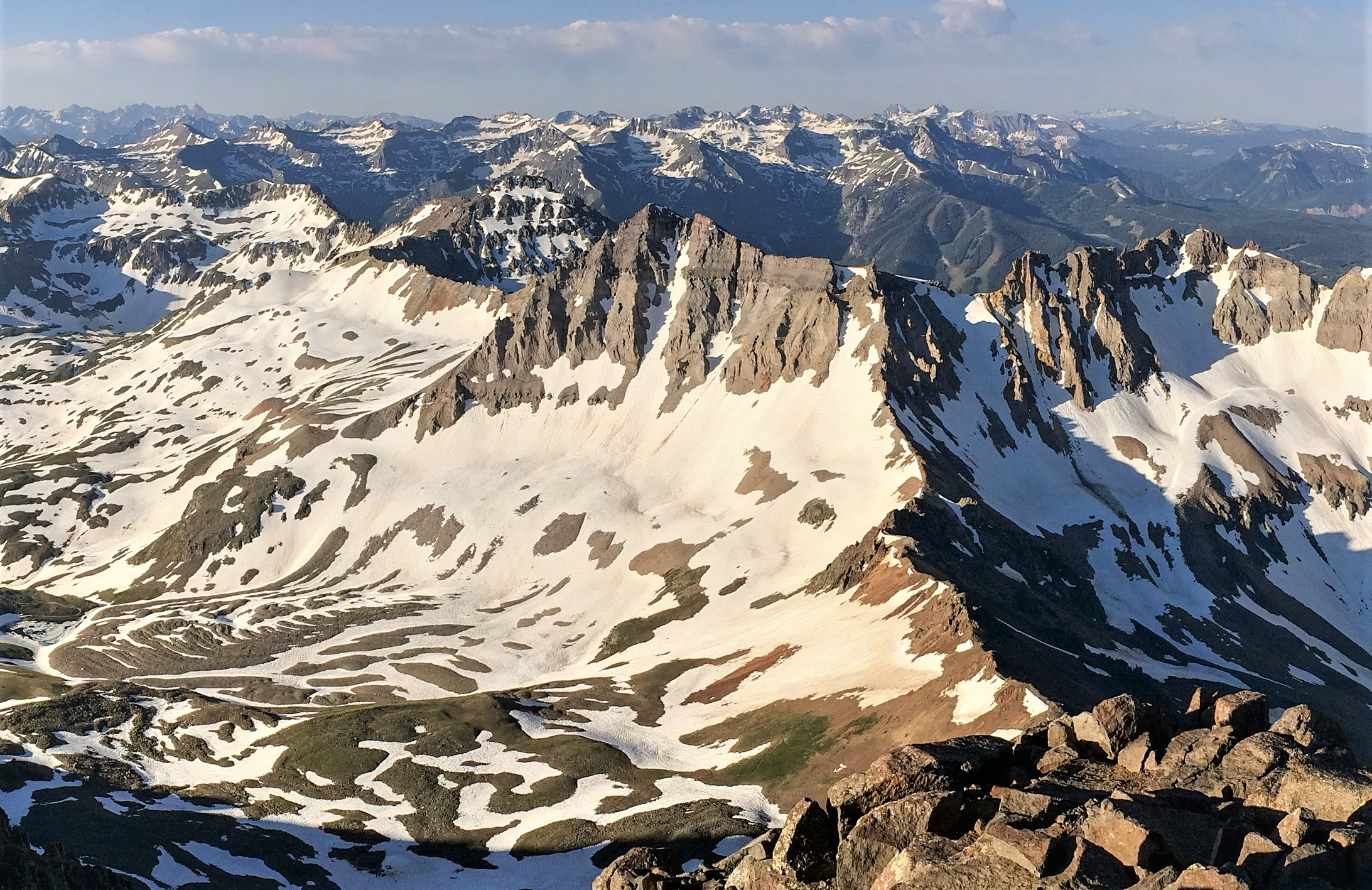
Gilpin Peak seen from summit of Mt. Sneffels

== Climate ==
According to the Köppen climate classification system, Gilpin Peak is located in an alpine subarctic climate zone with long, cold, snowy winters, and cool to warm summers. Due to its altitude, it receives precipitation all year, as snow in winter, and as thunderstorms in summer, with a dry period in late spring. Precipitation runoff from the mountain drains into tributaries of the San Miguel and the Uncompahgre Rivers.

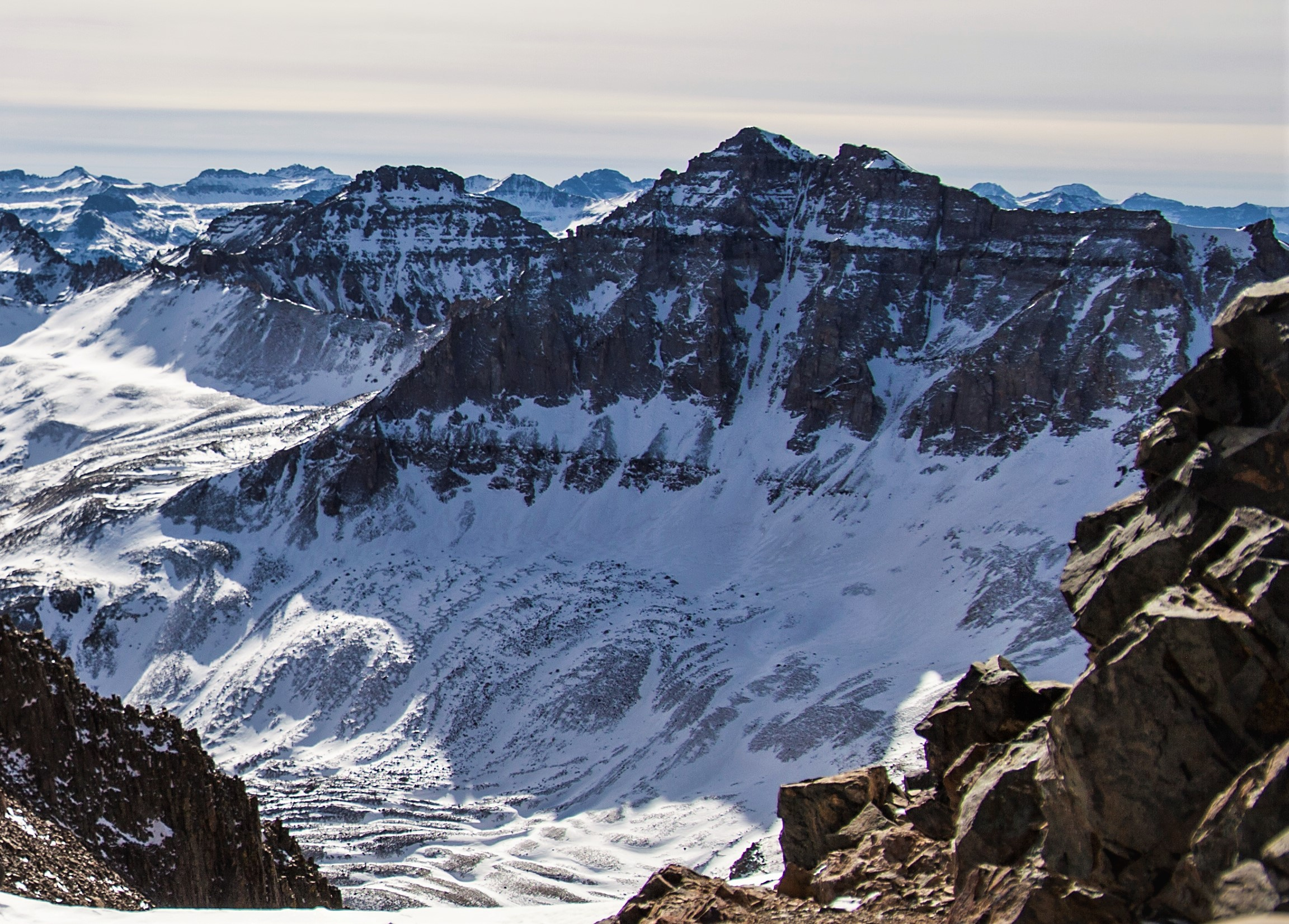
Mt. Emma (left) and Gilpin Peak (right)

== See also ==
- List of Colorado mountain ranges
- List of Colorado mountain summits
  - List of Colorado fourteeners
  - List of Colorado 4000 meter prominent summits
  - List of the most prominent summits of Colorado
- List of Colorado county high points

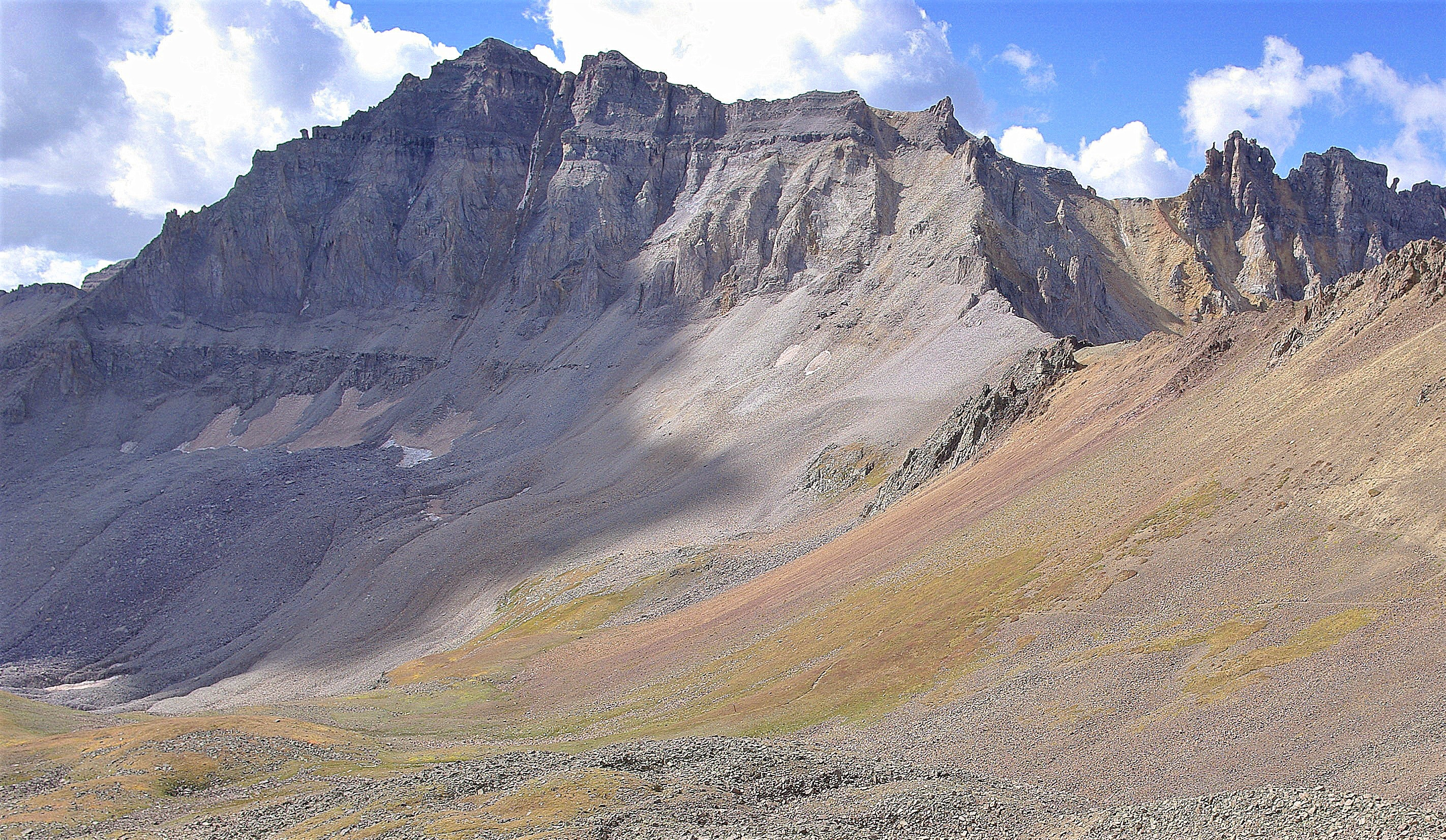
Gilpin Peak, NNE aspect
