= Yankee Boy Basin =

Valley in Colorado, United States

Coordinates: 37°59′46″N 107°46′39″W

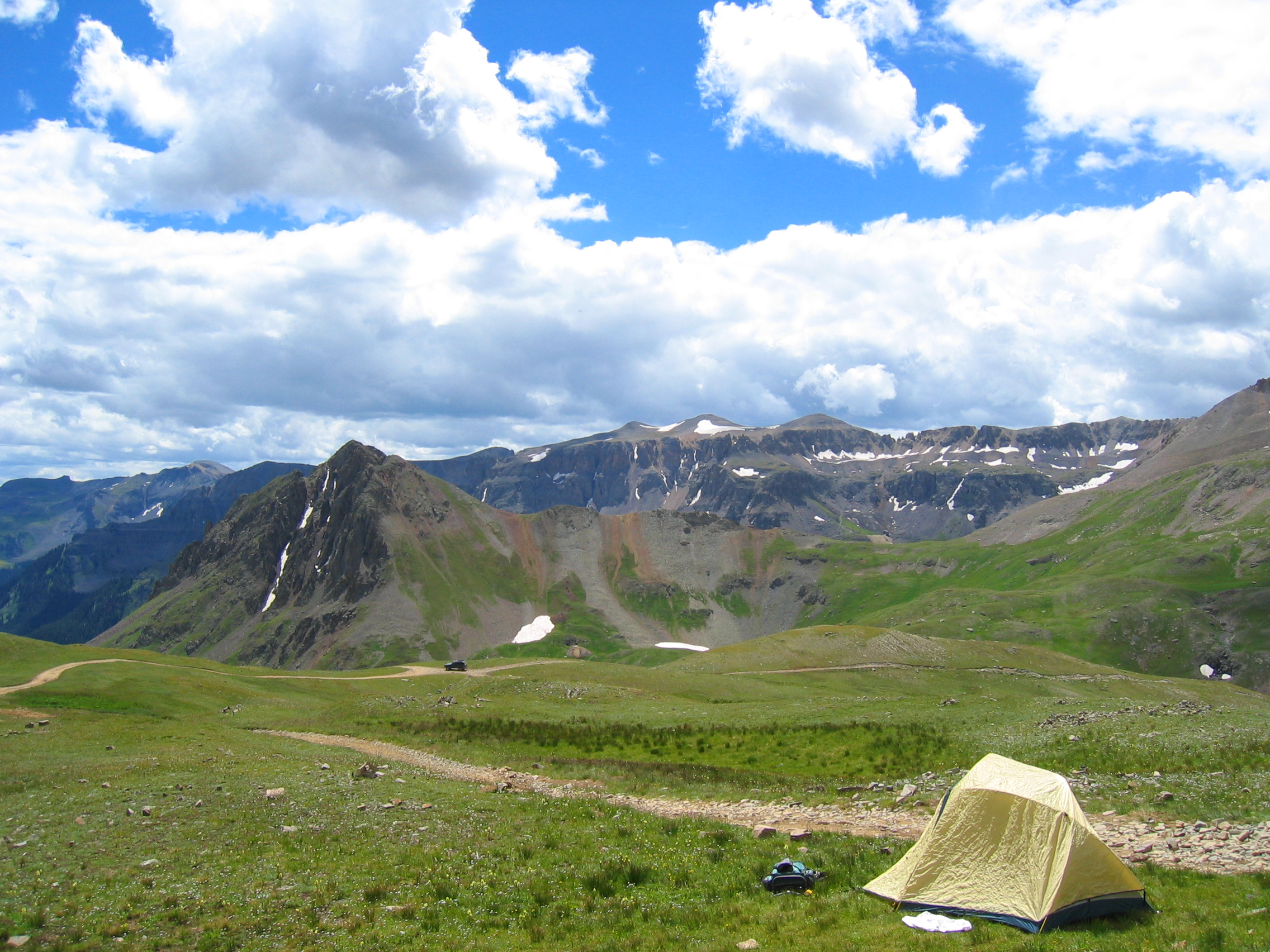
View of Upper Yankee Boy Basin, near the trailhead for Mount Sneffels (Stony Mountain left of center)

Yankee Boy Basin is an alpine basin in Ouray County, southwestern Colorado. It is in the San Juan Mountains, protected within Uncompahgre National Forest.

The basin−valley is well renowned for its display of wildflowers during the spring bloom period, and for Twin Falls on Sneffels Creek.

== Visiting ==
Access is provided by a dirt four wheel drive road which branches off the Ouray County road that runs from Ouray to Camp Bird Mine. The road starts a quarter mile south of Ouray, passes a DOT site, and winds its way up the canyon.

Along the way are several primitive campgrounds that tend to be rarely visited. These encourage collecting dead-and-down firewood, though, which occasionally brings locals and people visiting other campgrounds. In general, though, the area is fairly private.

Yankee Boy Basin is a good place to see native wildlife, including: deer, black bear, birds of prey, and other fauna of the southwestern Rocky Mountains region.

== See also ==
- Chief Ouray
- San Juan Mountains (Colorado)
- Uncompahgre National Forest
