= Teakettle Mountain =

Mountain in Colorado, United States

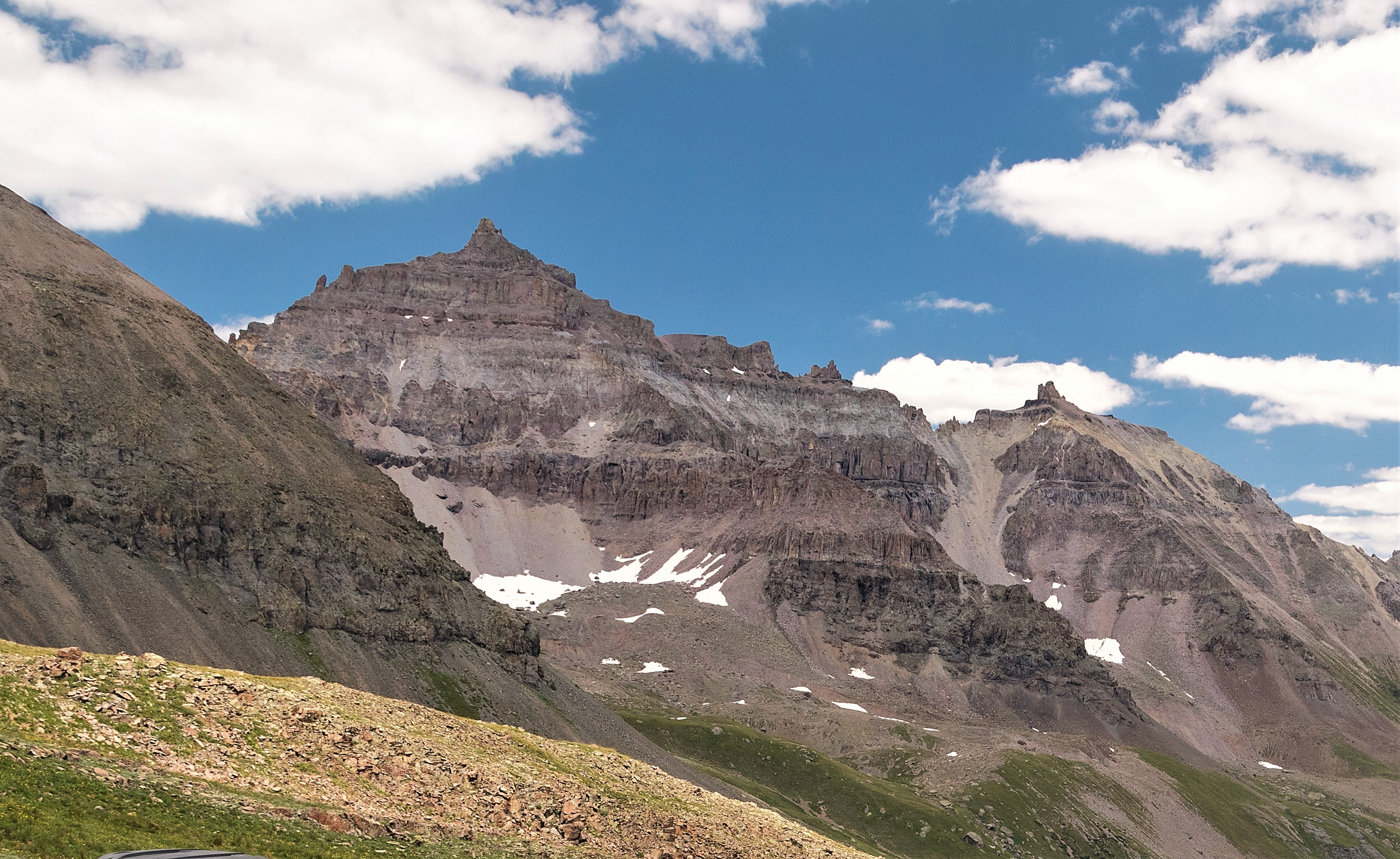
- South aspect

Highest point
- Elevation: 13,825 ft (4,214 m)
- Prominence: 739 ft (225 m)
- Isolation: 1.68 mi (2.70 km)
- Coordinates: 38°00′03″N 107°45′42″W

Geography
- Location within Colorado
- Location: Ouray County, Colorado, U.S.
- Parent range: San Juan Mountains, Sneffels Range
- Topo map(s): USGS 7.5' topographic map Mount Sneffels, Colorado

Teakettle Mountain, elevation 13,825 ft (4,214 m), is a summit in the Sneffels Range of southwest Colorado. The peak is west of Ouray in the Uncompahgre National Forest.

== See also ==
- List of Colorado mountain ranges
- List of Colorado mountain summits
  - List of Colorado fourteeners
  - List of Colorado 4000 meter prominent summits
  - List of the most prominent summits of Colorado
- List of Colorado county high points
