= Mount Sneffels =

Mountain in Colorado, United States

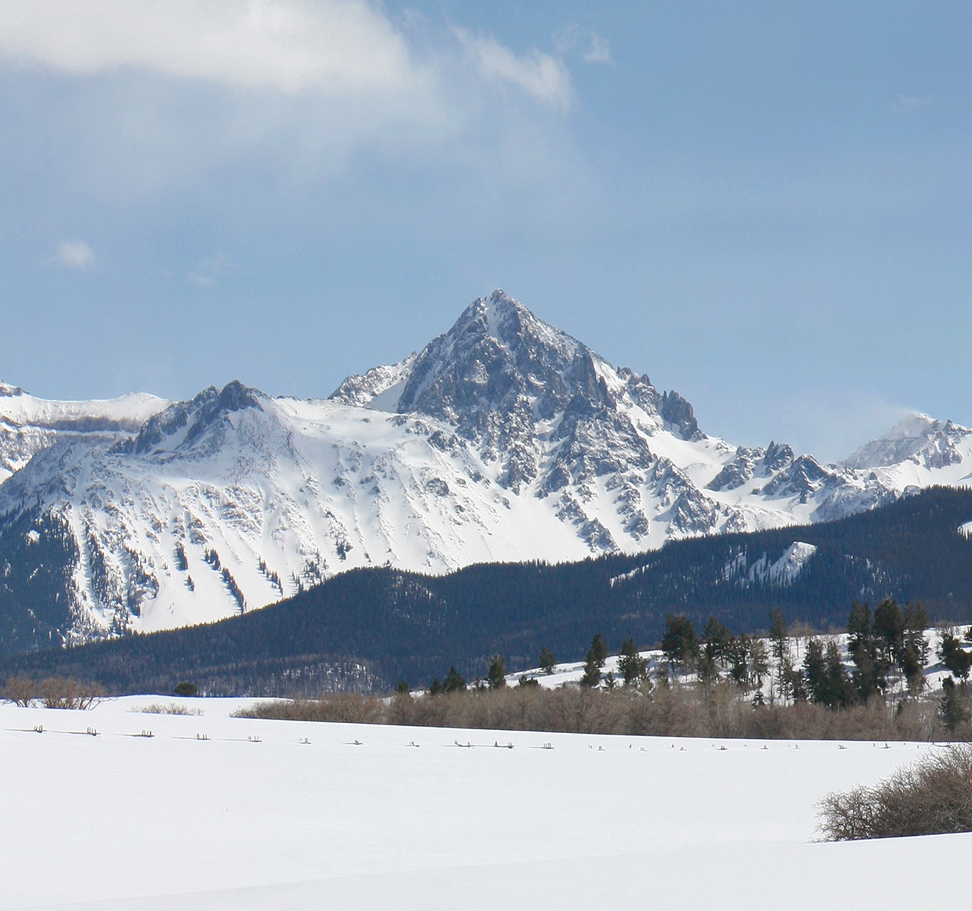
- View of Mount Sneffels from the north

Highest point
- Elevation: 14,153.3 ft (4,313.9 m); NAPGD2022
- Prominence: 3050 ft (930 m)
- Isolation: 15.71 mi (25.3 km)
- Listing: North America highest peaks 51st; US highest major peaks 37th; Colorado highest major peaks 18th; Colorado fourteeners 27th; Colorado county high points 16th
- Coordinates: 38°00′14″N 107°47′32″W

Geography
- Location within Colorado
- Location: High point of Ouray County, Colorado, United States
- Parent range: San Juan Mountains, Highest summit of the Sneffels Range
- Topo map(s): USGS 7.5' topographic map Mount Sneffels, Colorado

Climbing
- Easiest route: South Slopes: Easy Scramble, class 3

Mount Sneffels is the highest summit of the Sneffels Range in the Rocky Mountains of North America. The 14,153-foot (4313.93 m) fourteener is located in the Mount Sneffels Wilderness of Uncompahgre National Forest, 6.7 miles (10.8 km) west by south (bearing 256°) of the City of Ouray in Ouray County, Colorado, United States. The summit of Mount Sneffels is the highest point in Ouray County.

== Mountain ==
Mount Sneffels is notable for its great vertical relief, as it rises 7,200 feet above the town of Ridgway, Colorado 6 miles to the northeast.

The primary route to the summit follows a creek bed up from Yankee Boy Basin and is rated class 3. A secondary route follows a ridge line to the summit from the saddle of Blue Lakes Pass.

Mount Sneffels was named after the volcano Snæfell, which is located on the tip of the Snæfellsnes peninsula in Iceland. That mountain and its glacier, Snæfellsjökull, which caps the crater like a convex lens, were featured in the Jules Verne novel A Journey to the Center of the Earth. An area on the western flank of Mount Sneffels gives the appearance of volcanic crater. Geologically, the mountain is a Tertiary aged igneous stock (Ti) composed of intermediate rock (monzonite, monzodiorite, granodiorite, and minor monzogranite) intruded into a volcanic stack of older San Juan Volcanics (Tsj).

Seen from the Dallas Divide on State Highway 62, Mount Sneffels is one of the most photographed mountains in Colorado. It is also depicted on Colorado driver licenses and I.D. cards as of 2023.

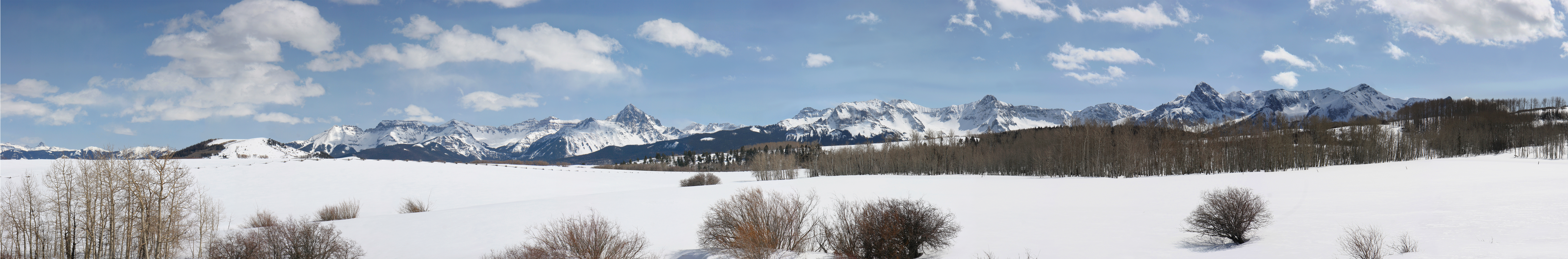
Panorama of the Sneffels Range of the San Juan Mountains, photographed from Dallas Divide pass

== Historical names ==
- Mount Blaine
- Mount Sneffels – 1906
- Sneffels Peak

== See also ==
- List of mountain peaks of North America
  - List of mountain peaks of the United States
    - List of mountain peaks of Colorado
      - List of Colorado county high points
      - List of Colorado fourteeners
