= Switzerland of America =

Switzerland of America may refer to:

- Glacier National Park (U.S.) ("America's Switzerland")
- Jim Thorpe, Pennsylvania
- New Hampshire
- Ouray, Colorado

== Other uses ==
- Uruguay, sometimes referred to as "Switzerland of the Americas"
