= St. Joseph's Miners' Hospital =

- U.S. National Register of Historic Places
- U.S. Historic district – Contributing property
- Location within Colorado Location within the United States
- Location: 420 Sixth Ave., Ouray, Colorado
- Coordinates: 38°01′23″N 107°40′09″W
- Built: 1887
- Architect: Frank Carney
- Architectural style: Italianate
- Part of: Ouray Historic District
- NRHP reference No.: 83003537
- Added to NRHP: October 6, 1983

St. Joseph's Miners' Hospital opened on August 27, 1887, in Ouray, Colorado. The architectural style of the building is Italianate and it is constructed of native stone. The hospital closed in 1964. This structure has been placed on the United States National Register of Historic Places.

== Ouray County Historical Museum ==
Today, this building houses the Ouray County Historical Society and operates as the Ouray County Historical Museum. Exhibits include mining, ranching and railroad artifacts, minerals, Native American artifacts, period room displays, medical equipment, household items and cultural displays. The museum also features a library and research center.
