= St. Elmo Hotel =

- U.S. National Register of Historic Places
- U.S. Historic district – Contributing property
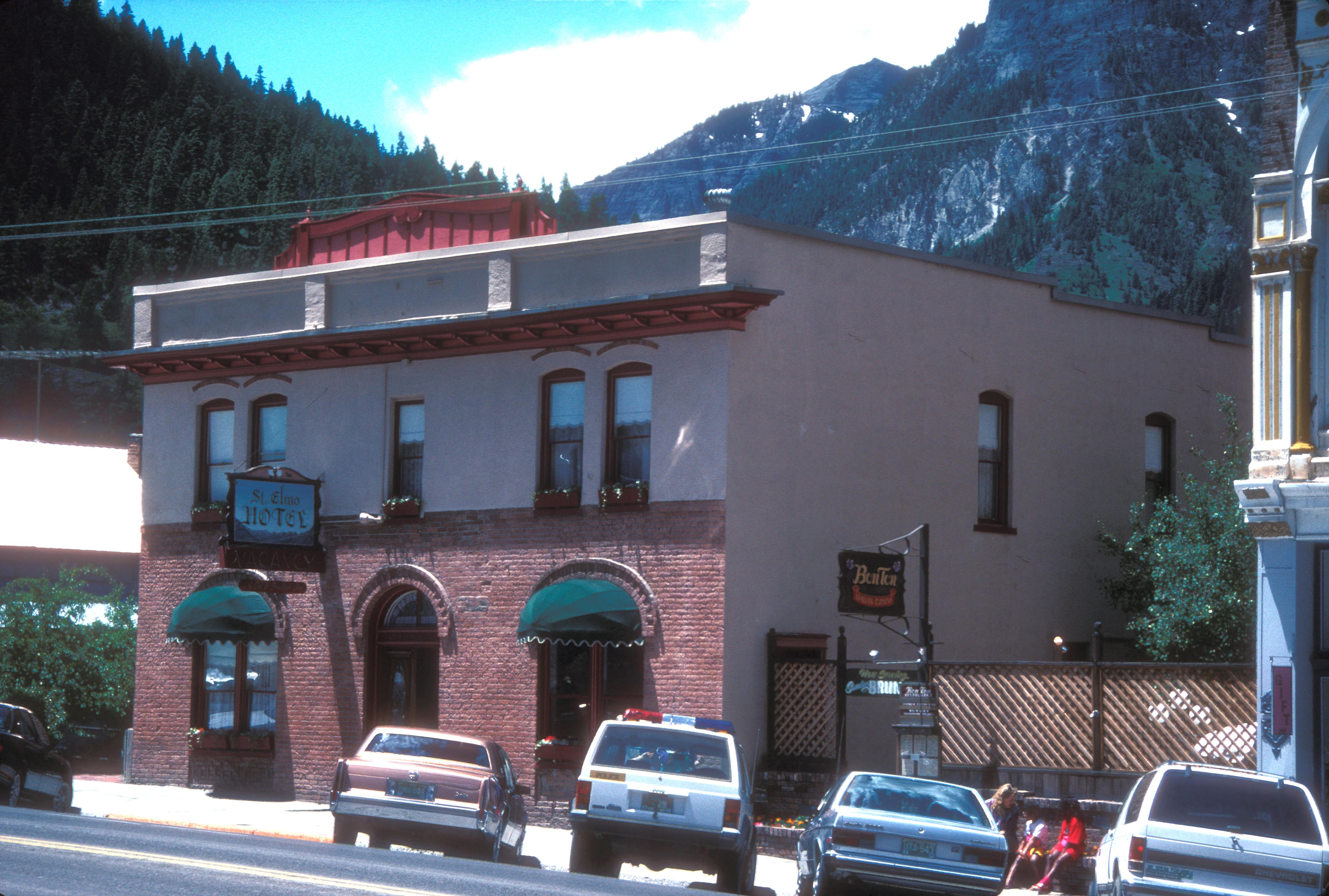

- Location within Colorado
- Location: 426 Main St., Ouray, Colorado
- Coordinates: 38°01′16″N 107°40′18″W
- Built: 1889
- Part of: Ouray Historic District
- NRHP reference No.: 83003537
- Added to NRHP: October 6, 1983

The St. Elmo hotel constructed in 1898 is located on Main Street in the town of Ouray, Colorado. This structure has been placed on the United States National Register of Historic Places.

The interior of the hotel has been restored as a Victorian era hotel, much the way it was when it opened to miners in the late 19th century.
