= Ouray County Courthouse =

Government building in Colorado, US

Coordinates: 38°1′20.8″N 107°40′10.7″W

- U.S. Historic district – Contributing property
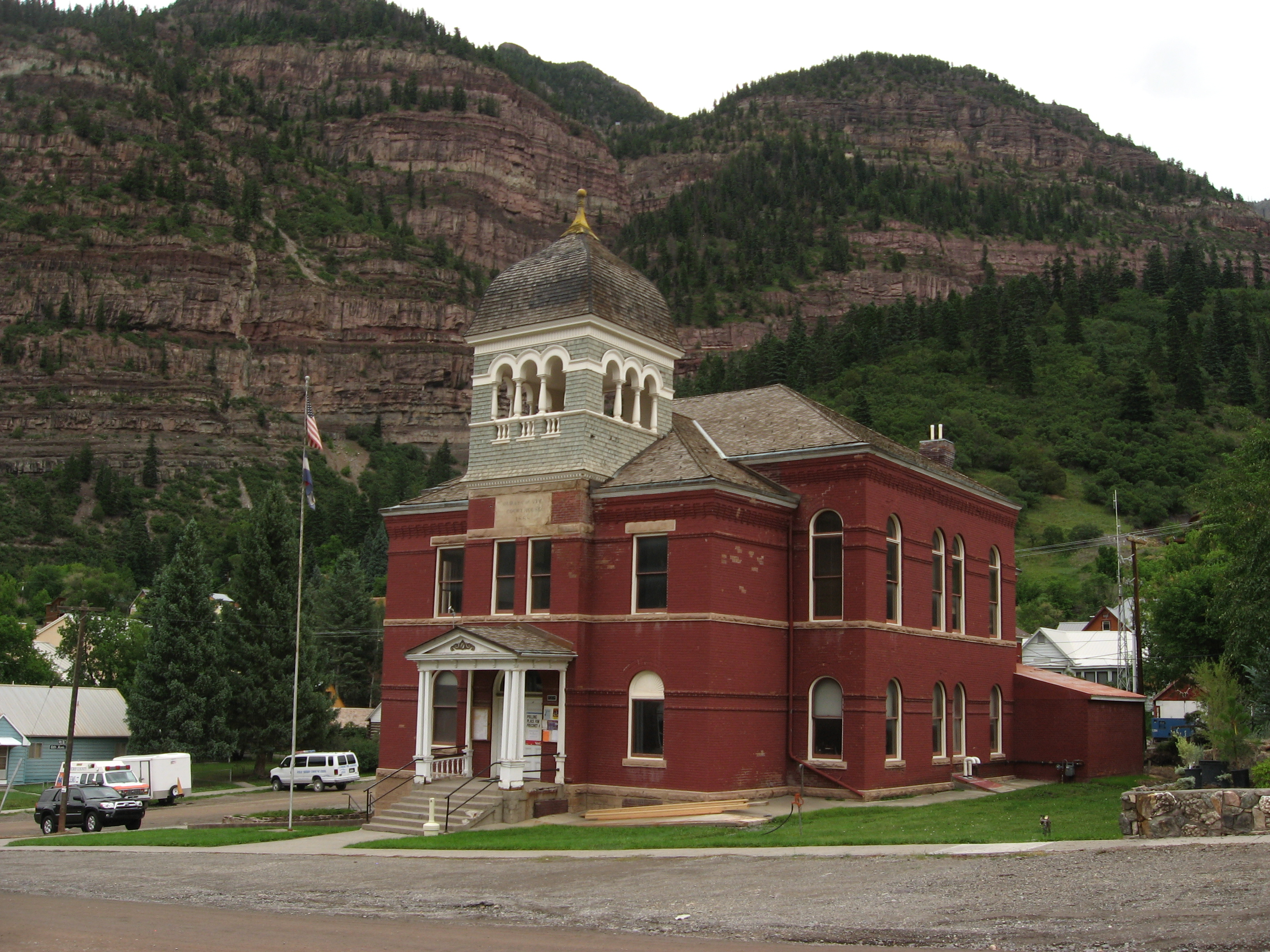
- Ouray County Courthouse

- Location within Colorado Location within the United States
- Location: Ouray, Colorado
- Area: 114 acres (46 ha)
- Part of: Ouray Historic District (ID83003537)
- Added to NRHP: October 6, 1983

The Ouray County Courthouse, constructed in 1888, is the seat of government of Ouray County, Colorado. It is located at the corner of 6th Avenue and 4th Street in Ouray, Colorado. This structure is a contributing property of the Ouray Historic District.

The courtroom was used in the John Wayne movie True Grit.
