= Thomas Walsh (miner) =

Irish-American miner (1850–1910)

Thomas Francis Walsh
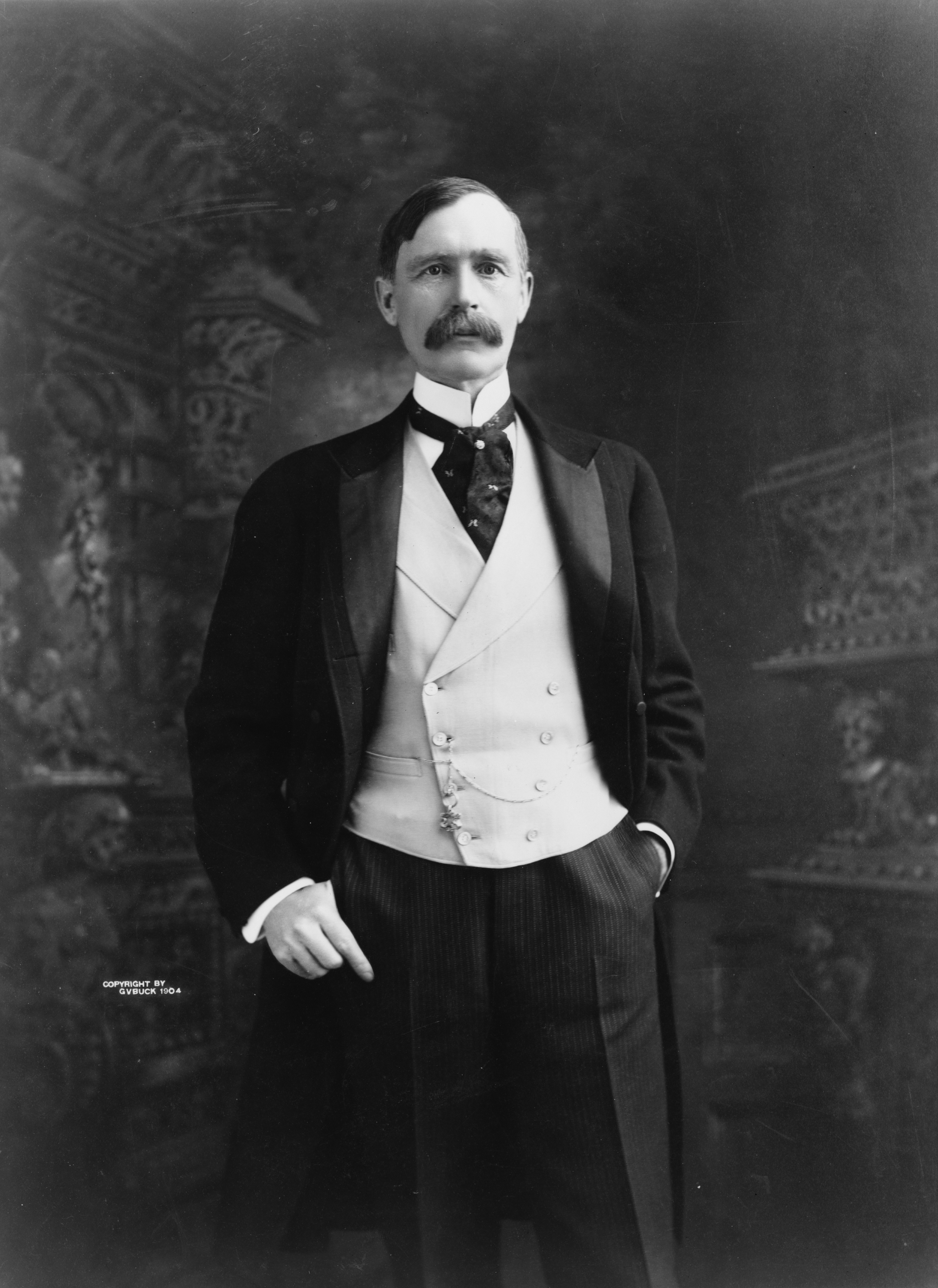
- Thomas Walsh in 1904
- Born: April 2, 1850; Lisronagh, Ireland
- Died: April 8, 1910 (aged 60); Washington, D.C., U.S.
- Occupation: Gold mine owner
- Spouse: Carrie Bell Reed
- Children: Evalyn Walsh McLean; Vinson Walsh

Thomas Francis Walsh (April 2, 1850 – April 8, 1910) was an Irish-American miner who, in 1896 in Colorado, discovered one of the largest gold mines in the United States of America.

== Early life ==
Walsh was born April 2, 1850, to Michael Walsh, a farmer, and Bridget Scully. He was most likely born on his father's farm, Baptistgrange, in Lisronagh, Tipperary, Ireland. He had two siblings, who both also emigrated to the United States and settled in the West. His sister Maria married Arthur Lafferty, a two-gun police sergeant in Leadville, Colorado. Their brother Michael died in 1904 in Denver, Colorado, of dropsy of the liver.

According to his daughter Evalyn Walsh Mclean's book, Father Struck It Rich, Walsh became an apprentice to a millwright at the age of twelve and grew into a fine carpenter.

In 1869, he and his sister Maria emigrated to the United States after the death of their father. For a time, Thomas settled in Worcester, Massachusetts, with his aunts, Catherine and Bridget Walsh Power, who helped "shake the greenhorn off him."

== Career ==
In the early 1870s Walsh heeded the call to "Go West, young man" and settled in Colorado, where he was paid well for his carpentry skills. Walsh was said to be attracted to the opportunities that came with the gold rush, including trading goods and services at inflated prices, as opposed to gold mining itself.

Gradually, he became more and more immersed in the gold industry. He was soon trading mining equipment to prospectors in exchange for their mining claims as payment. He also studied mining technology at night.

In 1877 he moved to Leadville, Colorado with a small fortune of between $75,000 (equivalent to $2,268,000 in 2025) and $100,000 (equivalent to $3,023,000 in 2025). Along with his wife, he ran the Grand Central Hotel in Leadville.

Eventually Walsh was overcome by gold fever. Unlike other prospectors, however, he took a methodical and careful approach to prospecting, which paid off. In 1896, he came home and uttered the words which his daughter later used as the title of her memoir: "Daughter, I've struck it rich!"

His Camp Bird Gold Mine near Ouray, Colorado was soon turning out $5,000 a day (equivalent to $194,000 in 2025) in ore. The Walsh family became very wealthy. In a short period of time, Walsh had made a fortune totaling $3,000,000 (equivalent to $116,100,000 in 2025).

Walsh donated a library which occupied the second floor in the Ouray City Hall and Walsh Library in Ouray.

=== Washington, DC ===
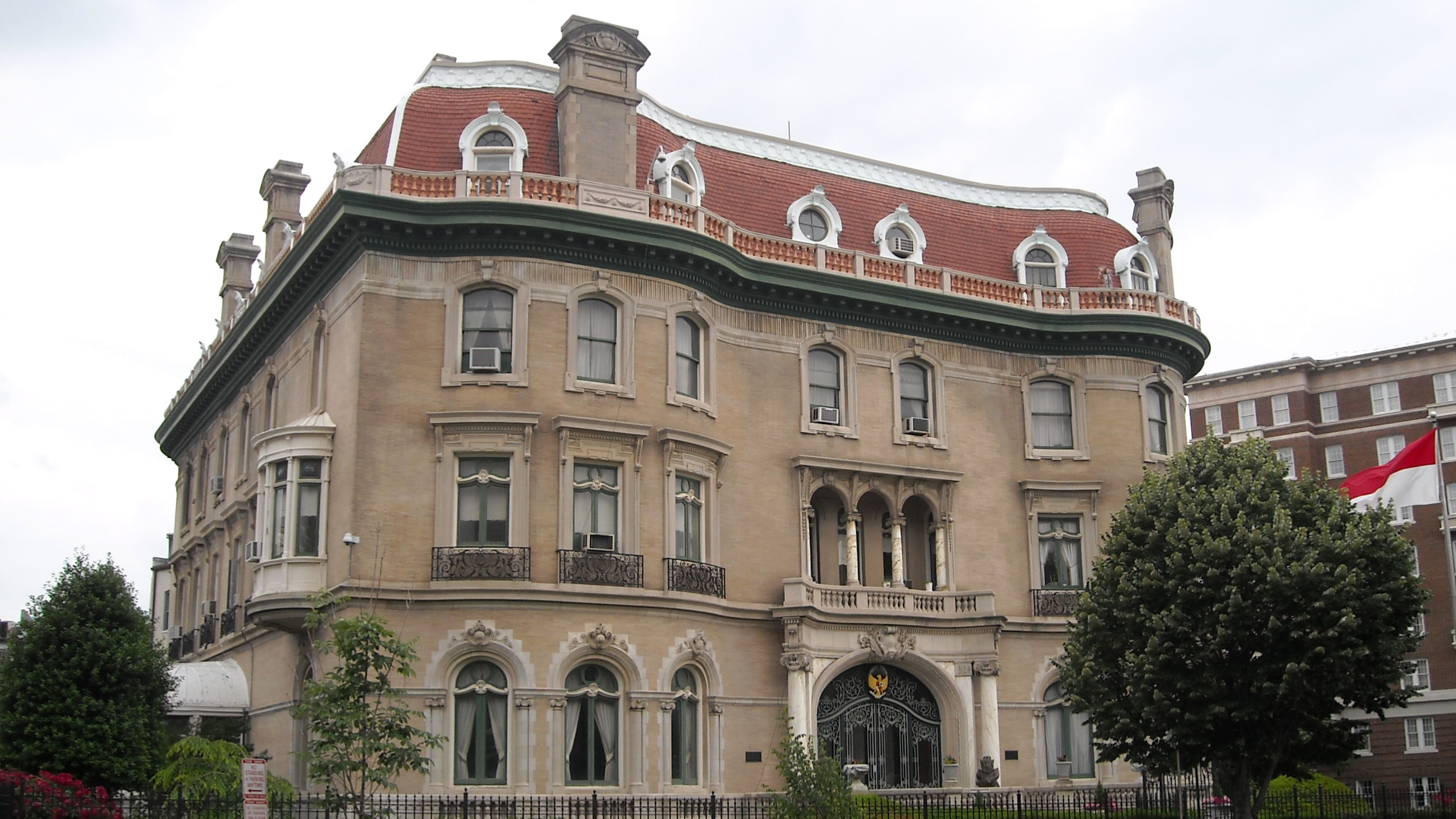
Walsh home in Washington, DC

With this wealth, Walsh and his family enjoyed a lavish lifestyle that included trips to Europe, fine clothes, and expensive motor cars. Soon after his mine was established, around 1898 the family moved to Washington, D.C. Walsh was moving in prominent circles, and President William McKinley appointed him as a US commissioner to the Paris Exposition of 1899.,

== Personal life ==
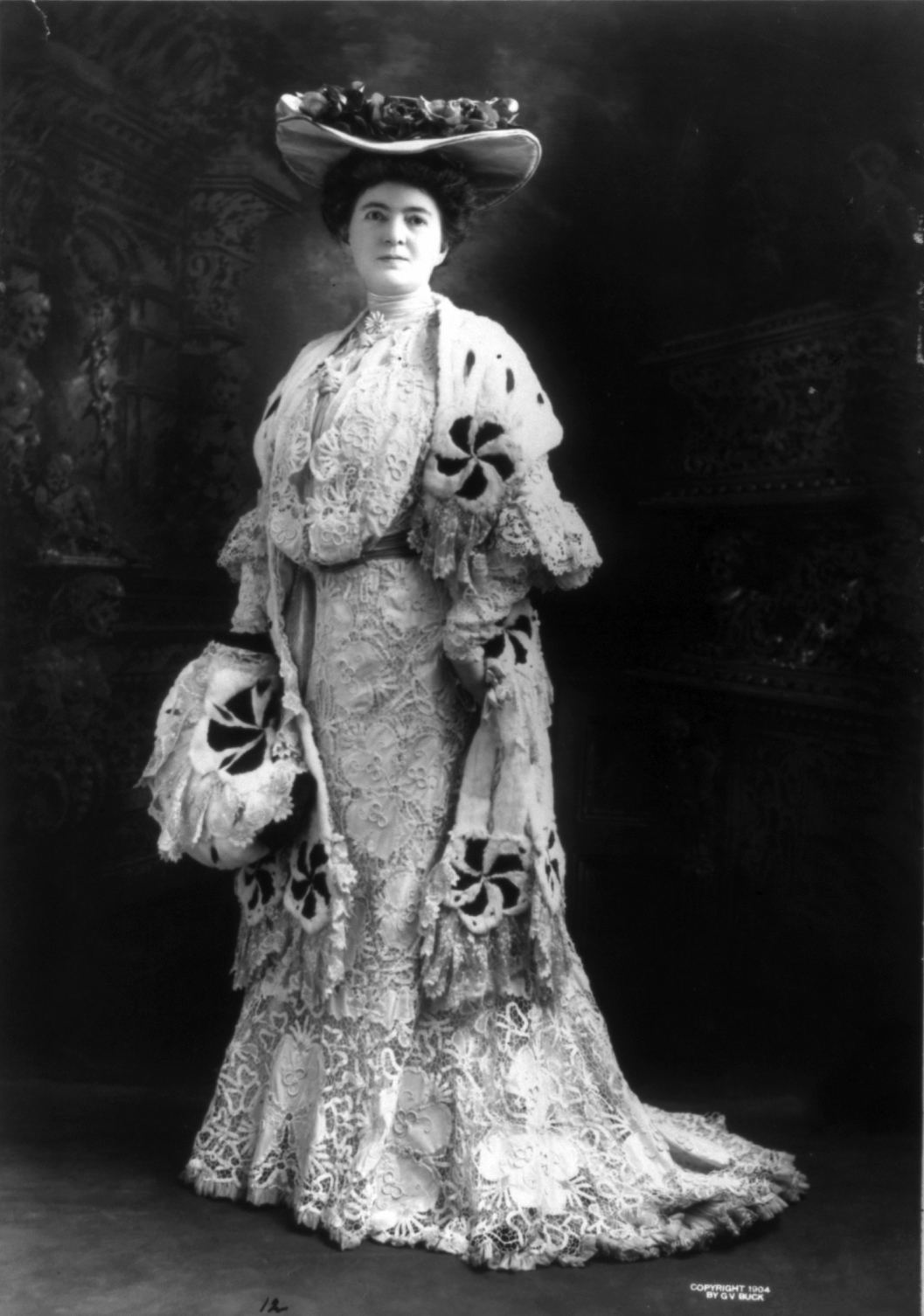
Carrie Reed Walsh

On July 11, 1879 in Leadville, Colorado, he married Carrie Bell Reed. The couple had two children:

- Evalyn Walsh, August 1, 1886 – April 24, 1947
- Vinson Walsh, April 9, 1888 – August 19, 1905, who died in a car accident

In 1903 the family moved into an ornate mansion at 2020 Massachusetts Avenue. Later, the house became the Indonesian Embassy. On January 23, 1909, The Aero Club of Washington was founded, with Walsh as president, to promote the new technology of aviation. Due to his prior involvement with the Paris Exposition, Walsh became friends with Leopold II of Belgium, for whom he designated a suite in his home. The King never made it to the United States but when Albert, Leopold's nephew, and his wife Elisabeth traveled to the United States in 1919, Walsh's wife, by then widowed, was decorated by the King for her service during World War I.

In 1908, Walsh's daughter Evalyn married Edward Beale McLean, the son of John Roll McLean, who later became the publisher and owner of The Washington Post from 1916-1933.

Walsh died on April 8, 1910, at his home in Washington, D.C.

=== Extended family ===
Thomas Walsh was a cousin twice removed of W. Arthur Garrity, Jr., the federal judge who issued the famous 1974 order that Boston schools desegregate by means of busing.

== Sources ==
- An informal family history written by Margaret Kennedy (c.1972)
- Father Struck it Rich, by Evalyn Walsh McLean (1936)
- Hope by Mary Ryan (2001)
