= Wright Opera House =

Wright Opera House may refer to:

- Wright Opera House Block, a building in Alma, Michigan
- Wright's Opera House, a building in Ouray, Colorado
