= Ouray City Hall and Walsh Library =

- U.S. National Register of Historic Places
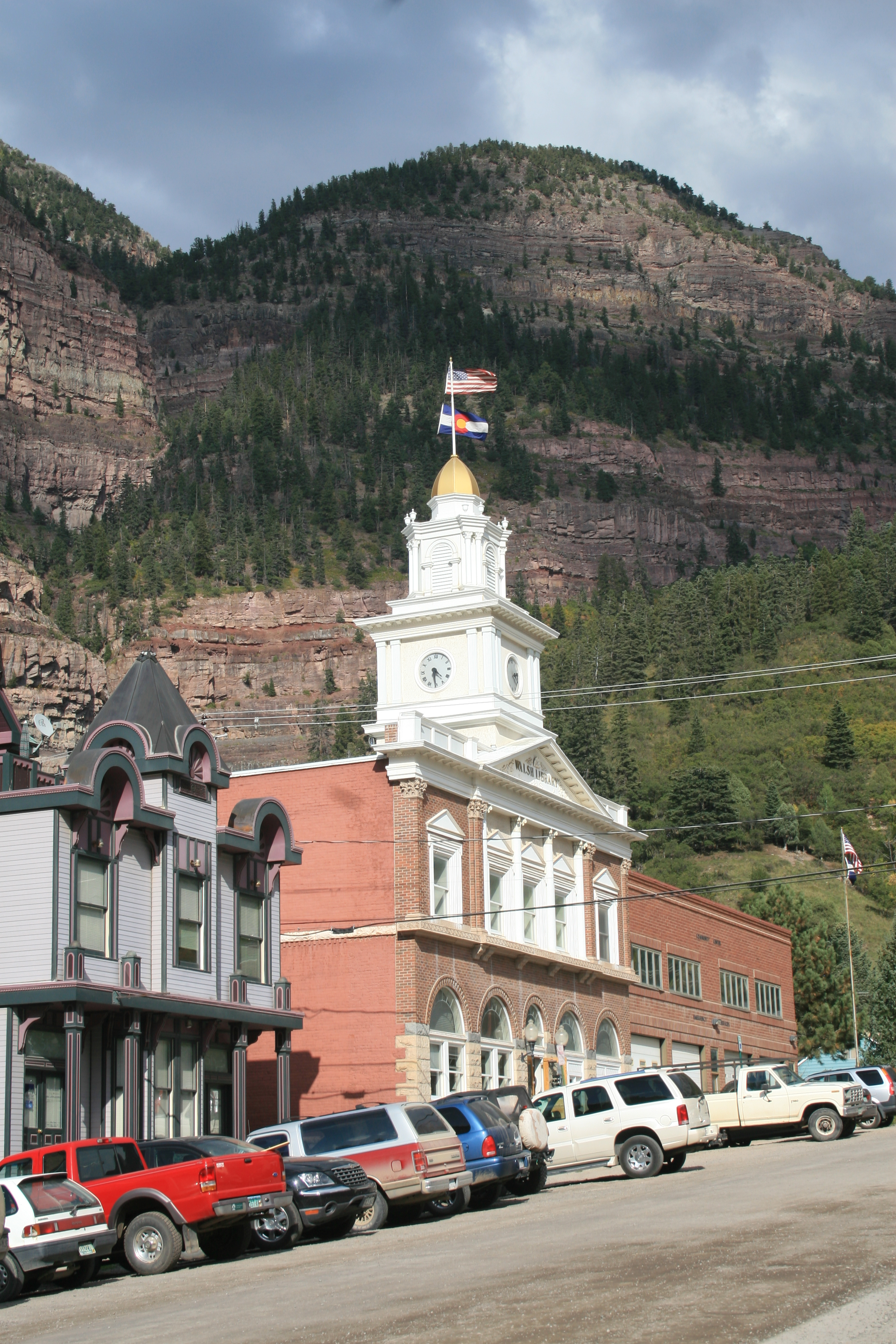

- Location within Colorado Location within the United States
- Location: 6th Ave. between 3rd and 4th Sts., Ouray, Colorado
- Coordinates: 38°1′23″N 107°40′12″W
- Built: 1899
- Architect: Walsh, Tom
- Architectural style: Late Victorian
- NRHP reference No.: 75000528
- Added to NRHP: April 16, 1975

The Ouray City Hall and Walsh Library are a pair of buildings in downtown Ouray, Colorado, United States. Located on 6th Avenue between 3rd and 4th Streets, they are together listed on the National Register of Historic Places.

== History ==
Constructed in 1900, the city hall was built as a miniature replica of Independence Hall in Philadelphia. Thomas Walsh, founder of the Camp Bird Mine, donated a library which occupied the second floor. The structure burned down in January 1950. It was listed on the Register in 1975. A restoration effort in 1976 as part of the city of Ouray Centennial failed, but another restoration effort led by then-mayor Bill Fries (C.W. McCall) succeeded in restoring the historic facade in 1988.
