= Western Hotel (Ouray, Colorado) =

- U.S. National Register of Historic Places
- U.S. Historic district – Contributing property
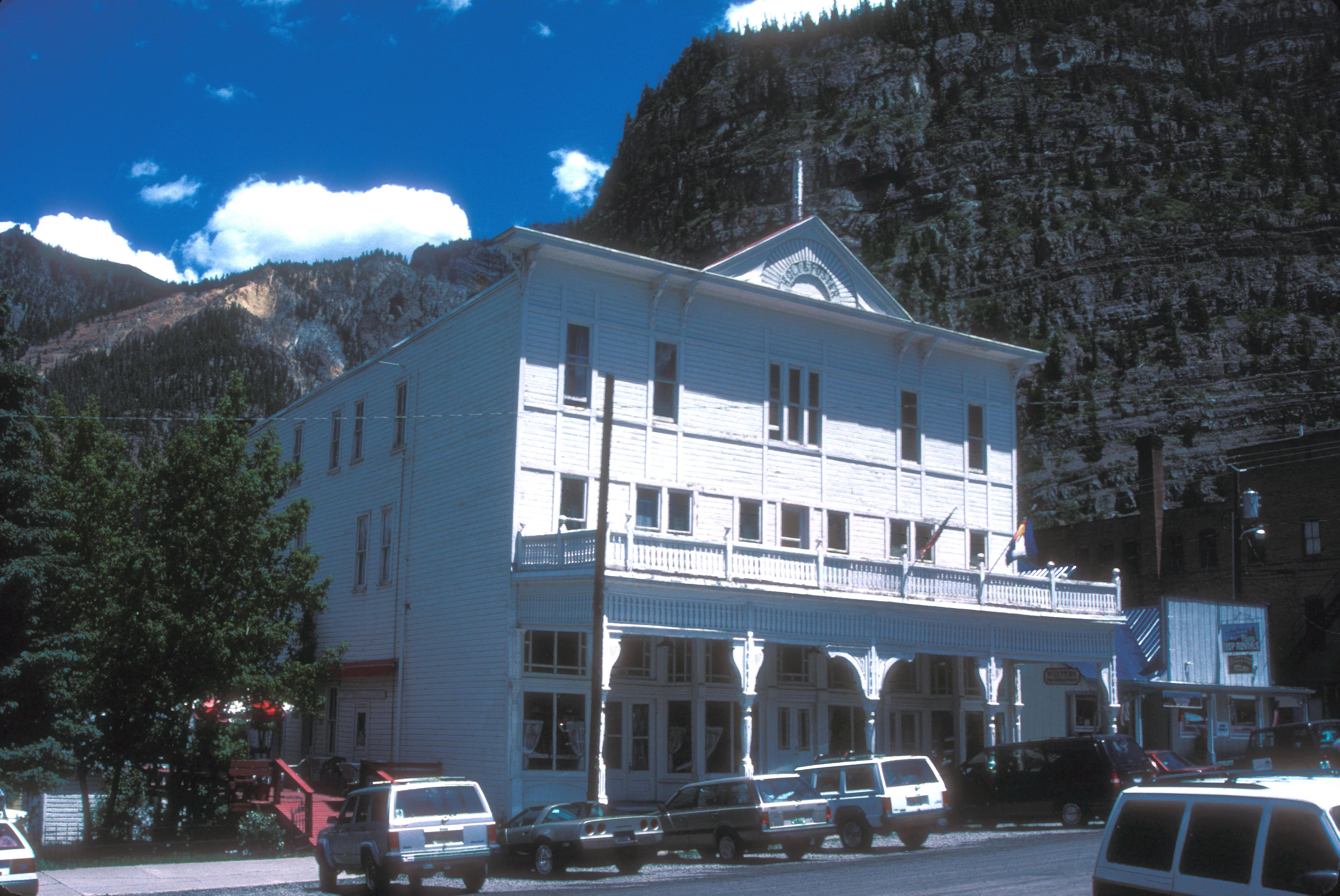

- Location within Colorado
- Location: 210 7th Ave., Ouray, Colorado
- Coordinates: 38°01′27″N 107°40′21″W
- Built: 1889
- Part of: Ouray Historic District
- NRHP reference No.: 83003537
- Added to NRHP: October 6, 1983

The Western Hotel opened in 1892. Located on 7th Avenue in Ouray, Colorado, USA, it was built near the Denver and Rio Grande Railroad's Passenger Station. It is one of the few remaining examples of a wood-frame hotel from the 1880s that remain today. The building was purchased by Zeppelin Development in 2021 and underwent major renovations.

This structure is a contributing property of the Ouray Historic District on the National Register of Historic Places.
