= Baptistgrange =

Baptistgrange (Irish Gráinseach Eoin Baiste) is the site of a monastic grange (farm) in County Tipperary, not far from the village of Lisronagh. In the historical sources it is often known as "Achadfada" or "Achfada". It is in a townland and civil parish of the same name.

The grange supplied food and other raw materials to the Augustinian monastery of St John the Baptist, Dublin. The grange church, the remains of which survive, is in the middle of a graveyard. It was associated with a village to the north-west (now deserted) and a castle to the west. The latter is referred to in the Civil Survey (1654-6) as "an old broken stump of a Castle with an old broken Bawne".

After the dissolution of the monasteries during the Reformation, the grange was leased out, being described as a "fortilage or castle, with a hall, etc. 51 acres and 12 cottages, leased in 1541 to the countess of Ormond at £4".

== Church ==
The church is divided between the nave and chancel, with an unusual triple chancel arch, a series of three arches right across the church interior, that has since collapsed. On either side of the former altar, in the north and south side walls, there is a lighting opening. Corbels project from the side walls to the west: these, instead of putlog holes, supported wooden gallery beams.
