= Wright's Opera House =

- U.S. Historic district – Contributing property

- Location within Colorado Location within the United States
- Location: 480 Third Street, Ouray, Colorado, United States
- Coordinates: 38.02139°N 107.67167°W
- Built: 1888
- Architectural style: Italianate
- Part of: Ouray Historic District (ID83003537)
- Added to NRHP: October 6, 1983

Wright's Opera House, sometimes referred to as Wright's Hall, was constructed in 1888 and is located at 472 Main Street in Ouray, Colorado. For many years after the mining bust and subsequent end of performances it was used as a multi-use building for presentations and community events. From 1979 to 1996 it was the home of the San Juan Odyssey, a multimedia presentation narrated by eventual Ouray mayor Bill Fries. Around the year 2000 it was converted into a movie theater which operated until late 2006. Currently it serves as a movie house and performing arts and special events rental venue.

This structure is a contributing property to the Ouray Historic District on the National Register of Historic Places.
