= Ouray Hydroelectric Power Plant =

Coordinates: 38.02276°N 107.67144°W

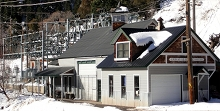

The Ouray Hydroelectric Power Plant (formerly known as Ouray Electric Light and Power Company) is a conventional hydroelectric power station located in Ouray, Colorado.

== History ==
The Ouray Electric Light and Power Company was incorporated on December 6, 1885. It is one of the 4 oldest operating power plants in the world.

The first electric plant was built at the south end of Oak Street, but the plant was moved and enlarged in 1890 near its present location. Water was used from the Uncompahgre River, when available. A steam engine was used to provide service when the flow was low or freezing conditions occurred. On February 20, 1886, the power company petitioned the Board of Trustees for a 20-year contract to erect poles, wires, and lamps throughout the city.

Water was originally provided from a tunnel driven into Box Canyon with water diverted from Canyon Creek, but the water proved to have too much sand and abrasives in it. In 1901 it was announced that a dam was to be completed the following year on the Uncompahgre river south of Ouray to furnish a more consistent supply for the hydroelectric plant. That dam is still in use today. Water from that dam also supplies water for the Ouray Ice Park, a premier ice climbing venue that extends for 3 miles south of Ouray and attracts thousands of climbers each year.

When the new dam was proposed it was described as follows: "The dam will be from 60 to 90 feet high and in the neighborhood of 300 feet wide. It will cross Bear Creek Valley [Uncompahgre Valley] and blockage of the waters of the stream will be about one mile and a quarter this side of Bear Creek Falls and when completed that back water will form a beautiful mountain lake, clear as crystal, one mile and a half wide by a mile and a quarter in length.

"The fall from the dam is 700 feet... It will be one of the most gigantic undertakings in the story of the San Juan, and every minute detail has been fully considered and there is no doubt about it being carried to a successful issue."

The Western Colorado Power Company (WCPC) was organized on March 12, 1913. By the following year it had consolidated the operations of eight major companies: the Durango Gas and Electric Company, San Juan Water and Power Company, Nunn's Telluride Power Company, the Telluride Electric Light Company, and (in 1914) the Ouray Power and Light Company, Montrose Electric Light and Power Company, Delta Electric Light Company, and Ridgway Electric Company. The new Western Colorado Power Company encompassed thirty predecessor companies, which had an average corporate life of only six years. Networking of the formerly isolated power plants was a daring concept, never before attempted on this scale. It involved construction of transmission lines through the steep mountains and construction of additional power generation sources. One result was a sharp decrease in the costs of electrical service.

Eric R. Jacobson, current owner of the Ouray power plant, provided much of the above information about how the collection came to Fort Lewis College. He has informed the Center of Southwest Studies that he has in his own possession about the same volume of records as is at the Center. Many of his records focus on the Ouray plant. Jacobson notes that Deep Springs College in Bishop, California, has records of L. L. Nunn; Paul Swatek of Chicago is on that College's board of directors and is perhaps the best contact regarding those records. Other records are available at the Olin Library of Cornell University in Ithaca, New York.

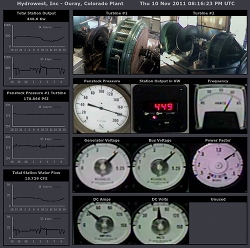

Eric Jacobson purchased the power plant in April 1992, from the Colorado-Ute Electric Association, a utility that was in bankruptcy and unable to make the needed repairs. He purchased the plant for $10 because he was the only pre-qualified bidder. Jacobson restored the dam, replaced pipe, and modernized the powerhouse. In the spring of 1994, the power plant was able to once again produce electricity. Public Service Company of Colorado contracted to sell the power which is wheeled to Denver to be used in the grid.

Richard Ezra Fowler was the operator of the Ouray Hydro plant and resided there from 1992 until 2008. He was helped by Chris Dobbins who took over plant operations after Mr. Fowler's untimely death.

== Hydrowest ==
The hydroelectric plant is owned by Hydrowest, Inc.

As part of the modernization of the Ouray Hydroelectric plant, custom-designed offsite monitoring and alarm systems have been added.
