= Camp Bird Mine =

Gold mine in Colorado, United States

Coordinates: 37°58′16″N 107°43′40″W

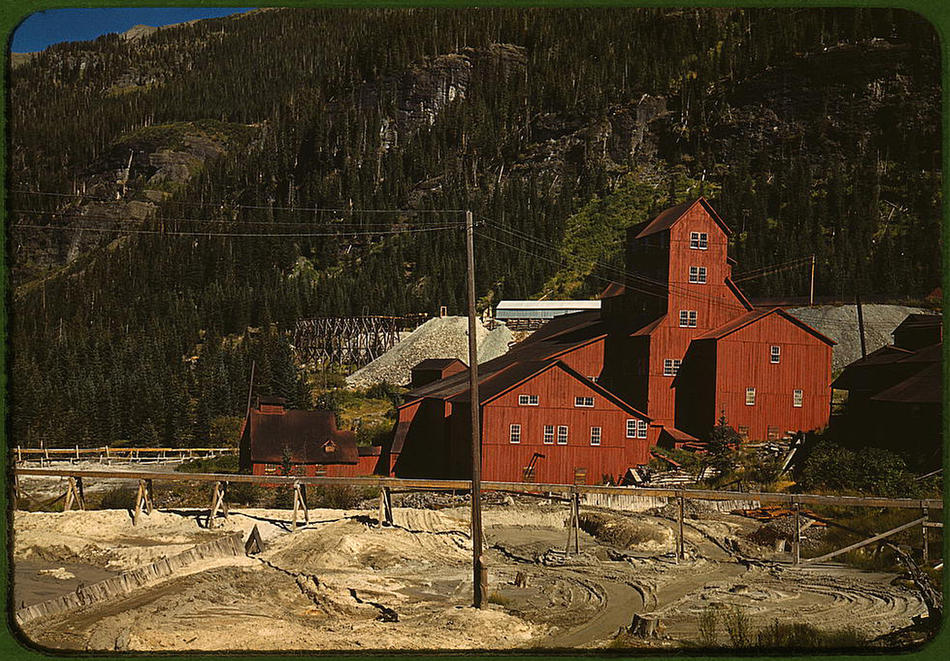
Mill at the Camp Bird Mine, October 1940. Photograph by Russell Lee.

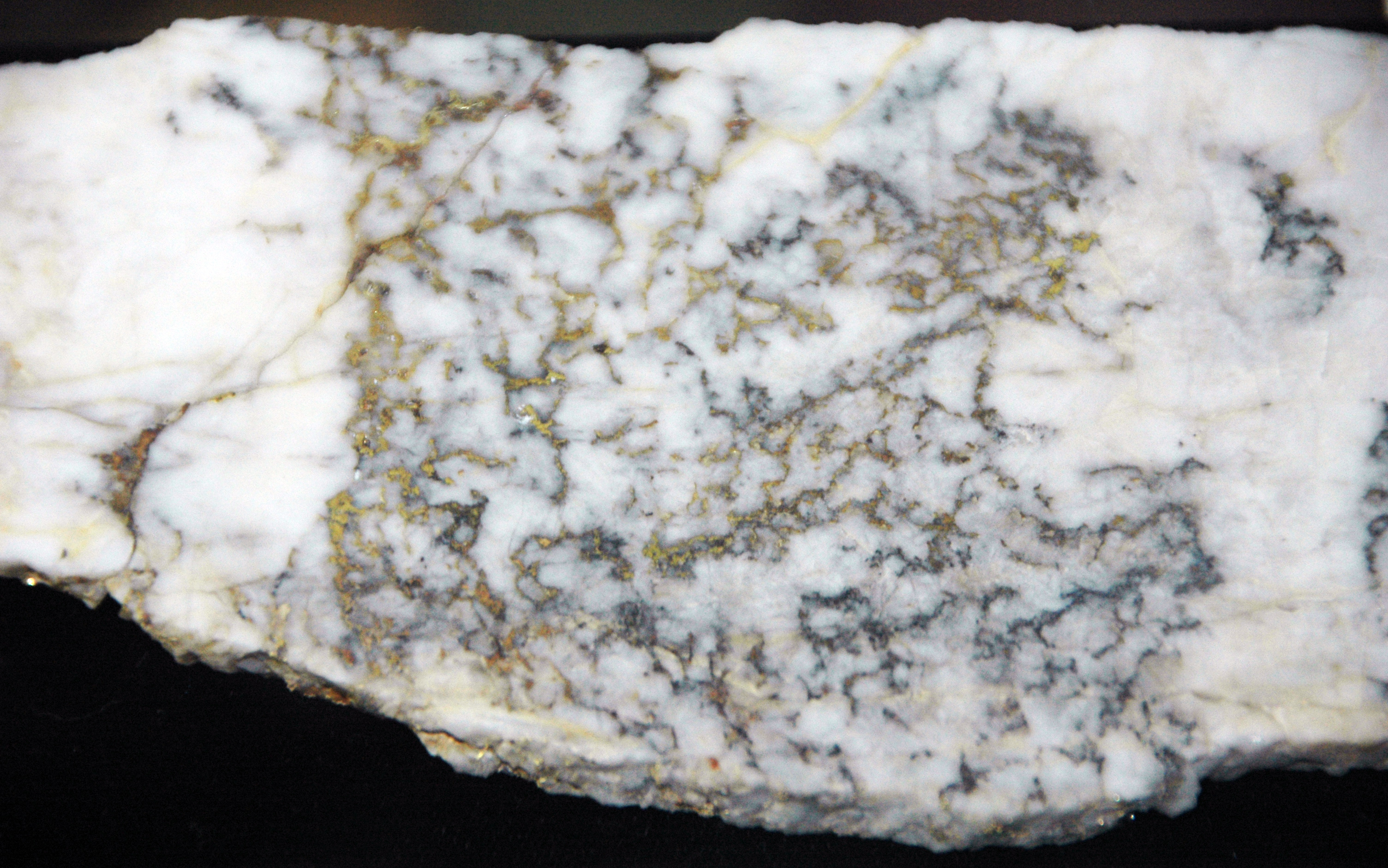
High-grade gold ore specimen from the mine

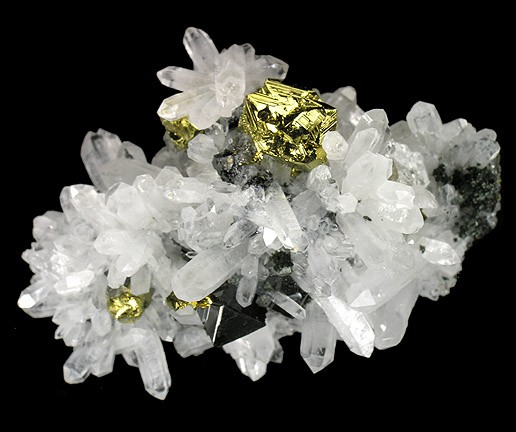
Chalcopyrite-Quartz specimen from the Camp Bird mine, 600' Stope, 2100' Level. Size: 5.2 x 3.6 x 2.7 cm. Click and scroll down for an enlargement.

The Camp Bird Mine is a famous and highly productive old gold mine located between Ouray and Telluride, Colorado. The mine is within the Sneffels-Red Mountain-Telluride mining district in the San Juan Mountains.

It was discovered by Thomas F. Walsh in 1896, and is (or was) owned by the Federal Resources Corp. The mine produced about 1.5 million troy ounces of gold, and 4 million troy ounces of silver, from 1896 to 1990. At 2009 prices, Camp Bird's production would be worth over US$1.5 billion. Walsh sold the property for US$5.2 million in 1902. Walsh's daughter, Evalyn Walsh McLean, later purchased the Hope Diamond. Walsh died in 1909. His daughter Evalyn Walsh McLean devotes several chapters to the mine in her autobiography "Father Struck It Rich".

Camp Bird is named after the "Camp Birds", probably Gray Jays, that ate many a miner's lunch. Western Colorado native David Lavender related his experiences working at the Camp Bird Mine in the 1930s in his classic memoir One Man's West.

C.W. McCall sang "Way out in Colorado, in the Camp Bird Mine, down deep in the darkness, on level nine..." The song moved the mine's founding to 1892 to make the rhyme work and added a ghost.

The Camp Bird Mine filed for a permit to resume mining in late 2007, but remains inactive as of August 2008. In 2012, the mine received permits to rehabilitate existing mine workings.

In August 2017, the Environmental Protection Agency (EPA) and the State of Colorado signed an Administrative Order on Consent with Caldera Mineral Resources, which purchased the property out of bankruptcy. The Order specifies on-site erosion control "to prevent the downstream migration of contaminated soil", with work to be accomplished in two phases. Phase 1, the EPA’s Time-Critical Removal Action, was started in August 2017, and was scheduled for completion in October 2018.

== See also ==
- Yankee Boy Basin
