= Gerald Waring =

American geologist and hydrologist

- Born: Gerald Ashley Waring; September 6, 1883; Ouray, Colorado, U.S.
- Died: November 2, 1971 (aged 88); Mountain View, California, U.S.
- Education: Stanford University
- Occupations: Geologist, hydrologist

Gerald Ashley Waring (September 6, 1883 – November 2, 1971) was an American geologist and hydrologist.

== Life and career ==
Waring was born in Ouray, Colorado, the son of John Waring, a mine carpenter, and Etta Richardson. He and his family moved to San Diego, California in 1887, and he graduated from high school in 1900. He attended Stanford University, earning his AB degree in geology. He worked as a hydrologist in Brazil.

Waring served as chief geologist at the Trinidad Petroleum Development Company in Trinidad and Tobago from 1919 to 1923. He returned to the United States, and lived in Oklahoma in 1923. After returning to his home country, he then served as chief geologist at the Margay Oil Corporation, and in 1925, he was named a fellow of the American Association for the Advancement of Science. In 1933, he worked in the field of groundwater with the United States Geological Survey.

== Death ==
Waring died at his home in Mountain View, California on November 2, 1971, at the age of 88.
