= Lisronagh =

Lisronagh Irish: Lios Ruanach
- Village
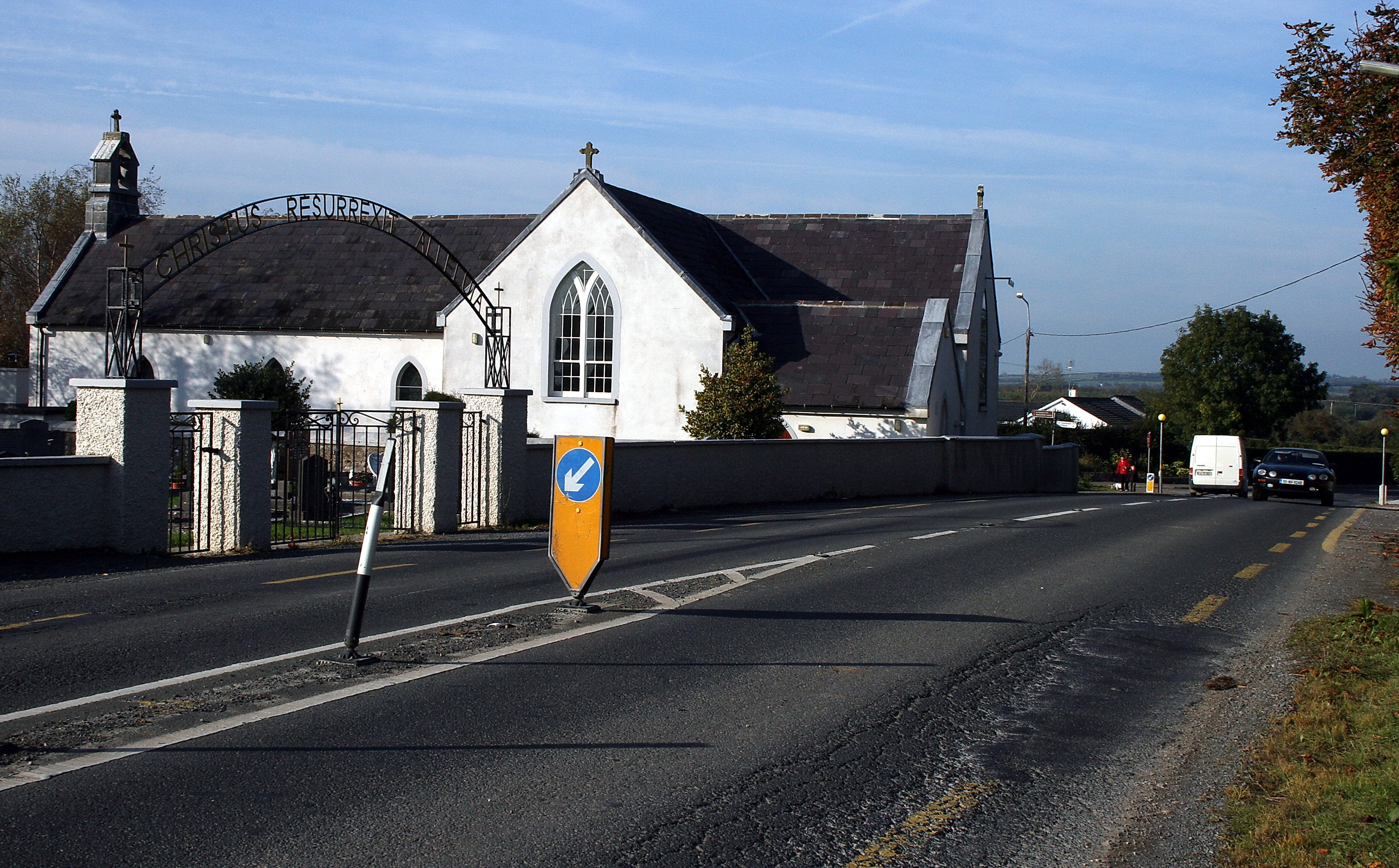
- Catholic Church in Lisronagh on the R689

- Location in Ireland
- Coordinates: 52°25′05″N 7°42′11″W
- Country: Ireland
- Province: Munster
- County: County Tipperary
- Time zone: UTC+0 (WET)
  - Summer (DST): UTC-1 (IST (WEST))

Lisronagh (Irish: Lios Ruanach) is a village in County Tipperary, in Ireland.

== Location ==
It is one half of the Roman Catholic parish of Powerstown and Lisronagh in the diocese of Waterford and Lismore. It is in the barony of Iffa and Offa East. It is located on the R689 regional road 7 km north of Clonmel, and 6 km south of Fethard.

== History ==
Lisronagh has been inhabited since at least the medieval period. It was held as a fief by the Anglo-Norman de Burgh family from the time of Henry II of England, in the 12th century. A rare surviving document, the rental of the manor of Lisronagh, dates to 1333 and describes the local lord's landholdings, the rents owed by local tenants, and the rights which the village's inhabitants possessed. The powerful Butler family built a tower house in the village in the 16th century, which survives in a ruinous condition.

By the early 19th century, Lisronagh had a population of 981. The area has continued to have a rural character, with an economy based on agriculture. Raising and racing Thoroughbred and blooded horses is also part of the culture.

== Horse racing ==
Lisronagh is home to the Lisronagh Point to Point race. It takes place annually at Lisronagh on a right-handed, mainly flat track, with a slight uphill finish. The Clonmel Agricultural Show owns the track, and leases it to the Tipperary Foxhounds for racing

== People ==
- Thomas Walsh (1850-1910), discoverer of one of the largest gold mines in the USA. Born and raised here, he emigrated to the US in 1869.

== See also ==
- List of towns and villages in Ireland
