= Ouray, Colorado =

City in Colorado, United States

- Home rule municipality
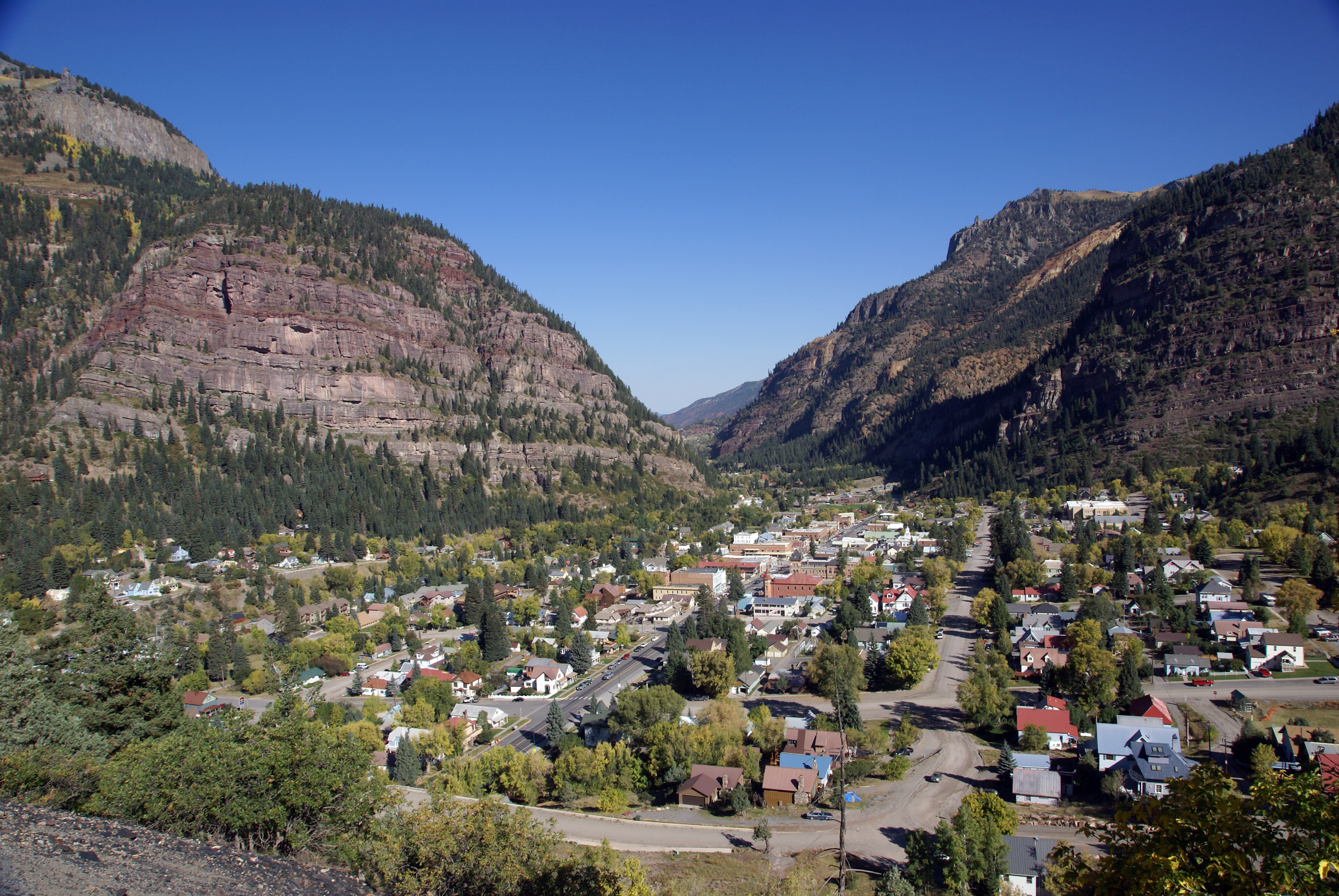
- Ouray looking north from Highway 550
- Nickname: Switzerland of America
- Location of the City of Ouray in Ouray County, Colorado
- Coordinates: 38°01′39″N 107°40′24″W
- Country: United States
- State: Colorado
- County: Ouray County
- City: Ouray
- Incorporated: March 24, 1884

Government
  - Type: Home rule municipality

Area
  - Total: 0.86 sq mi (2.23 km^{2})
  - Land: 0.86 sq mi (2.23 km^{2})
  - Water: 0 sq mi (0.00 km^{2})
- Elevation: 7,687 ft (2,343 m)

Population (2020)
  - Total: 898
  - Density: 1,040/sq mi (403/km^{2})
- Time zone: UTC−07:00 (Mountain (MST))
  - Summer (DST): UTC−06:00 (MDT)
- ZIP Code: 81427 (PO Box)
- Area code: 970
- FIPS code: 08-56420
- GNIS feature ID: 2411342
- Website: City of Ouray

Ouray (/ˈjʊəreɪ/ YOOR-ay) is a home rule municipality that is the county seat of Ouray County, Colorado, United States. The city population was 898 as of the 2020 census. The Ouray Post Office has the ZIP Code 81427. Located at an elevation of 7,792 feet (2,375 m), Ouray's climate, natural alpine environment, and scenery have earned it the nickname "Switzerland of America".

== History ==
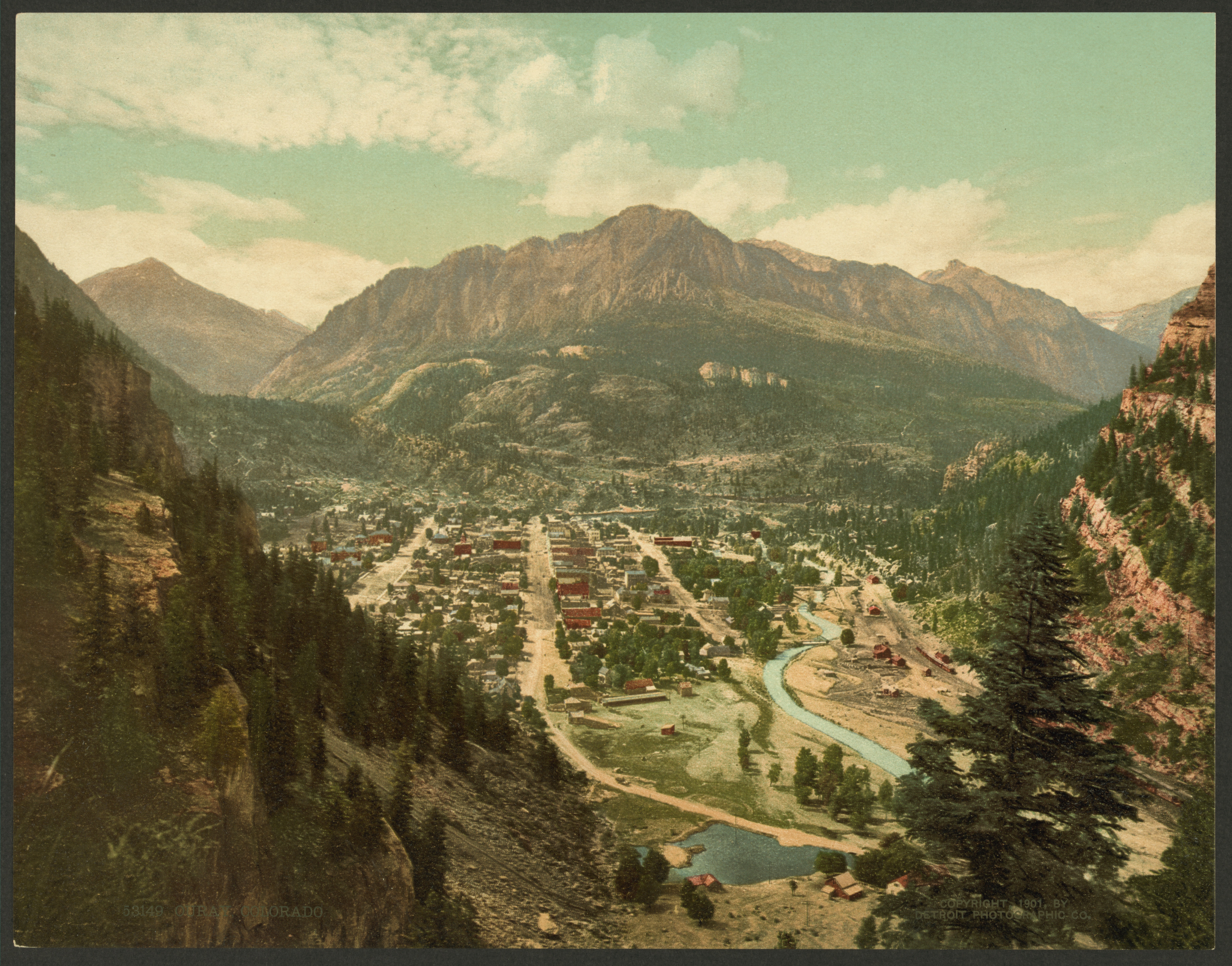
Ouray, Colorado in 1901

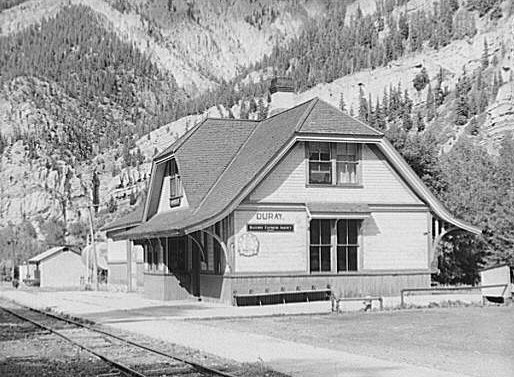
D&RGW Railroad station in Ouray, 1940

Established by miners seeking silver and gold in the surrounding mountains, the town once boasted more horses and mules than people. Prospectors arrived in the area in 1875. In 1877, William Weston and George Barber found the Gertrude and Una gold veins in Imogene Basin, six miles south southwest of Ouray. Thomas Walsh acquired the two veins and all the open ground nearby. In 1897, Walsh opened the Camp Bird Mine, adding a twenty-stamp mill in 1898, and a forty-stamp mill in 1899. The mine produced almost 200,000 ounces of gold by 1902, when Walsh sold out to Camp Bird, Ltd. By 1916, Camp Bird, Ltd., had produced over one million ounces of gold.

At the height of the mining, Ouray had more than 30 active mines. After changing its name together with the county's name several times, the town was incorporated on October 2, 1876, named after Chief Ouray of the Utes, a Native American tribe. By 1877 Ouray had grown to over 1,000 in population and was named county seat of the newly formed Ouray County on March 8, 1877.

The Denver & Rio Grande Railway arrived in Ouray on December 21, 1887. It continued until automobile and truck traffic caused ridership to drop. The last regularly scheduled passenger train was September 14, 1930. The line between Ouray and Ridgway was abandoned on March 21, 1953.

In 1986, Bill Fries, who was known better as C. W. McCall, was elected mayor. Fries served the municipality for six years.

The entirety of Main Street is registered as a National Historic District with most buildings dating from the late nineteenth century. The Beaumont Hotel and the Ouray City Hall and Walsh Library are listed on the National Register of Historic Places individually, while the Ouray County Courthouse, St. Elmo Hotel, St. Joseph's Miners' Hospital (housing the Ouray County Historical Society and Museum), Western Hotel, and Wright's Opera House are within the historic district.

== Geography ==
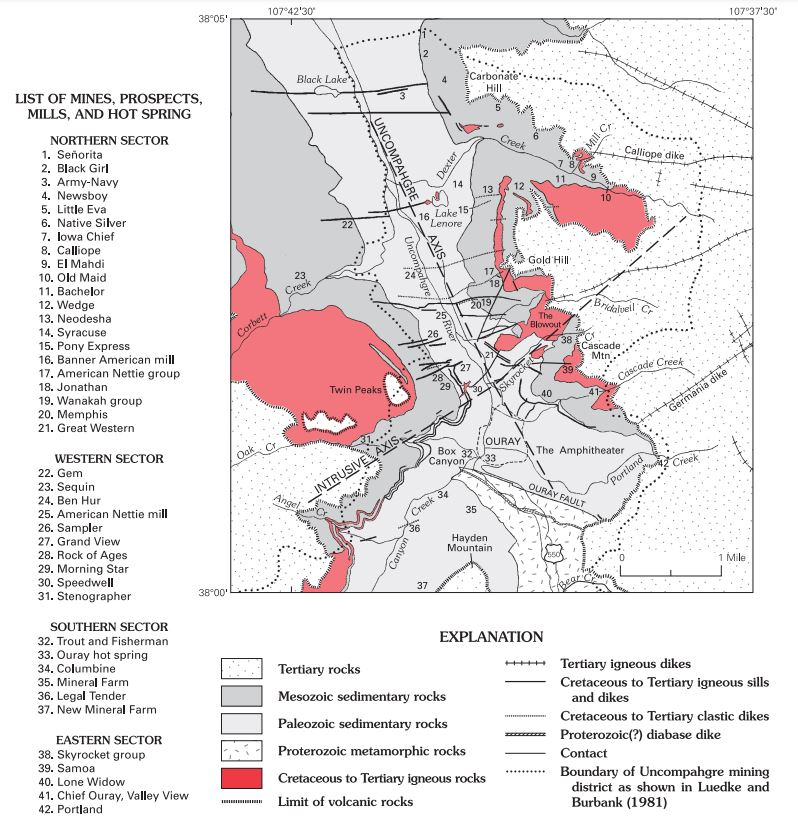
Ouray geological map and location of historic mines

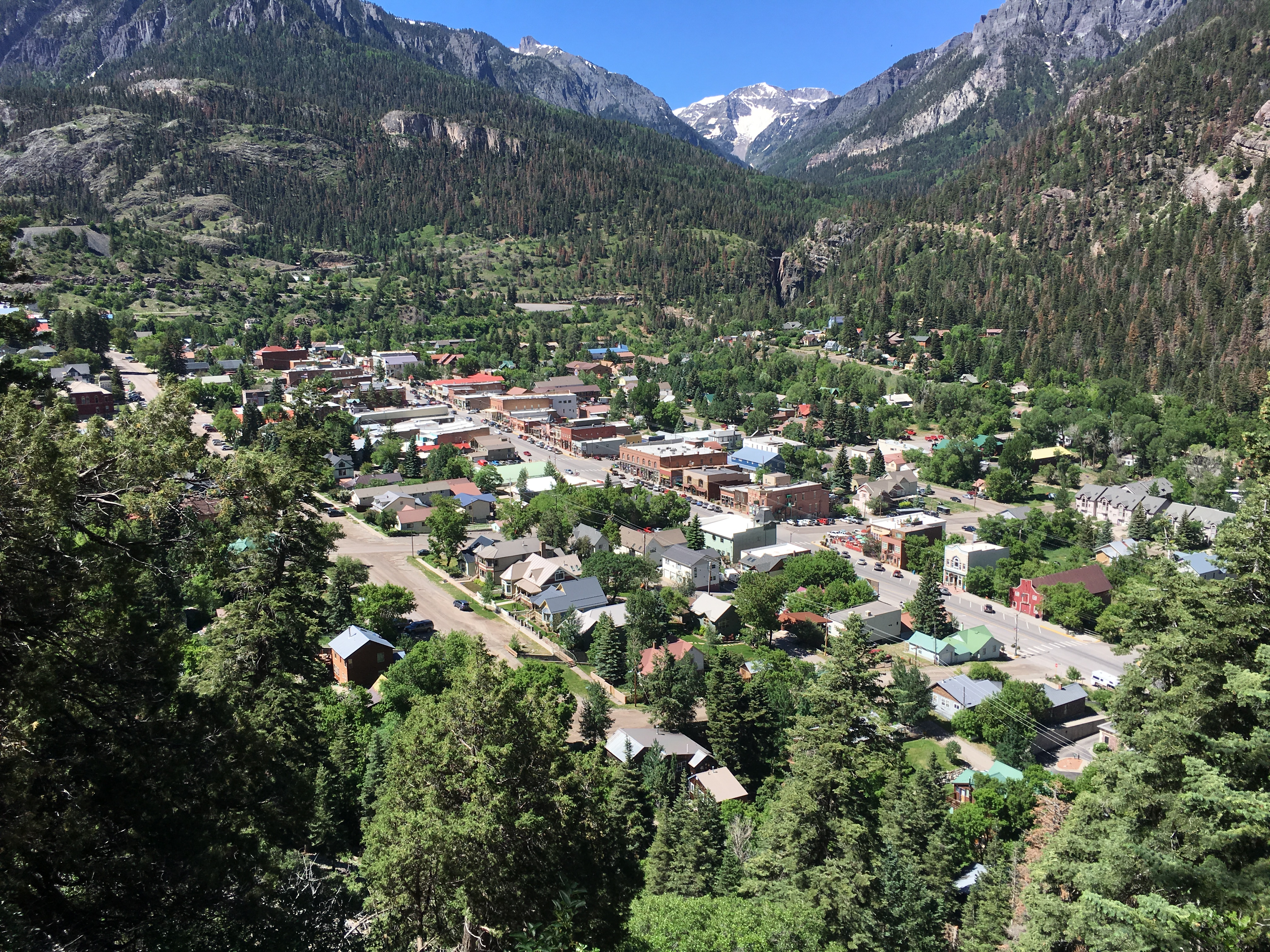
View of Ouray in 2016

Ouray is located in the San Juan Mountains of southwestern Colorado. It is about 40 miles (64 km) south of Montrose. It is only 10 miles (16 km) northeast of Telluride, but due to the severity of the landscape, the drive is about 50 miles (80 km). Ouray is connected to Silverton and then Durango to the south by Red Mountain Pass which crests at just over 11,000 feet (3,400 m). The drive along the Uncompahgre River and over the pass is nicknamed the "Million Dollar Highway", although the exact origin of the name is disputed. Yankee Boy Basin is located a few miles from the town.

According to the United States Census Bureau, the city has a total area of 0.8 square miles (2.1 km^{2}), all of it land.

=== Climate ===
Ouray is located at an elevation of 7,792 feet (2,375 m), and experiences four distinct seasons. Summers are warm in the day and mild to cool at night with brief thunderstorms often occurring in the afternoons in July and August sometimes resulting in intense, though short lived, rainfall. Autumn is cool and mostly clear with occasional rain. Winters are long and cold—though seldom extremely so—with considerable snowfall. Spring is generally cool with early spring often bringing the largest snowfalls; late spring into early summer (mid-May through late June) is mild to warm and is usually the driest time of year. The Köppen climate classification for Ouray is Dfb.

Climate data for Ouray, Colorado, 1991–2020 normals, extremes 2000–present
Month	Jan	Feb	Mar	Apr	May	Jun	Jul	Aug	Sep	Oct	Nov	Dec	Year
Record high °F (°C)	57 (14)	61 (16)	70 (21)	75 (24)	88 (31)	93 (34)	94 (34)	89 (32)	88 (31)	80 (27)	70 (21)	61 (16)	94 (34)
Mean maximum °F (°C)	49.0 (9.4)	52.4 (11.3)	62.5 (16.9)	69.8 (21.0)	76.2 (24.6)	87.7 (30.9)	88.7 (31.5)	84.7 (29.3)	80.8 (27.1)	72.3 (22.4)	62.0 (16.7)	51.3 (10.7)	89.8 (32.1)
Mean daily maximum °F (°C)	34.4 (1.3)	36.5 (2.5)	44.5 (6.9)	52.2 (11.2)	63.4 (17.4)	73.7 (23.2)	79.1 (26.2)	75.0 (23.9)	68.9 (20.5)	57.4 (14.1)	44.2 (6.8)	34.9 (1.6)	55.4 (13.0)
Daily mean °F (°C)	24.7 (−4.1)	27.5 (−2.5)	34.5 (1.4)	41.5 (5.3)	51.2 (10.7)	60.1 (15.6)	65.9 (18.8)	63.1 (17.3)	56.8 (13.8)	45.6 (7.6)	34.0 (1.1)	25.2 (−3.8)	44.2 (6.8)
Mean daily minimum °F (°C)	15.0 (−9.4)	18.5 (−7.5)	24.6 (−4.1)	30.8 (−0.7)	39.0 (3.9)	46.5 (8.1)	52.7 (11.5)	51.2 (10.7)	44.7 (7.1)	33.8 (1.0)	23.7 (−4.6)	15.5 (−9.2)	33.0 (0.6)
Mean minimum °F (°C)	0.8 (−17.3)	2.5 (−16.4)	9.2 (−12.7)	17.3 (−8.2)	27.0 (−2.8)	36.9 (2.7)	47.0 (8.3)	45.3 (7.4)	33.6 (0.9)	20.0 (−6.7)	7.8 (−13.4)	0.7 (−17.4)	−3.7 (−19.8)
Record low °F (°C)	−11 (−24)	−16 (−27)	−5 (−21)	11 (−12)	17 (−8)	30 (−1)	40 (4)	41 (5)	27 (−3)	2 (−17)	−6 (−21)	−7 (−22)	−16 (−27)
Average precipitation inches (mm)	1.89 (48)	1.71 (43)	2.38 (60)	2.15 (55)	1.77 (45)	0.91 (23)	2.41 (61)	2.42 (61)	2.39 (61)	2.12 (54)	1.92 (49)	1.56 (40)	23.63 (600)
Average snowfall inches (cm)	22.4 (57)	19.6 (50)	23.8 (60)	14.6 (37)	3.6 (9.1)	0.1 (0.25)	0.0 (0.0)	0.0 (0.0)	0.5 (1.3)	5.1 (13)	20.2 (51)	16.5 (42)	126.4 (320.65)
Average extreme snow depth inches (cm)	12.3 (31)	12.9 (33)	10.1 (26)	6.5 (17)	2.3 (5.8)	0.1 (0.25)	0.0 (0.0)	0.0 (0.0)	0.3 (0.76)	3.0 (7.6)	8.1 (21)	10.0 (25)	16.4 (42)
Average precipitation days (≥ 0.01 in)	8.0	7.9	9.3	9.8	7.1	5.5	9.6	14.6	11.0	7.7	8.4	7.2	106.1
Average snowy days (≥ 0.1 in)	7.7	7.1	8.6	5.9	1.5	0.1	0.0	0.0	0.3	2.3	6.6	6.3	46.4
Source 1: NOAA
Source 2: National Weather Service (mean maxima and minima, snow depth 2000-2022)

== Economy ==
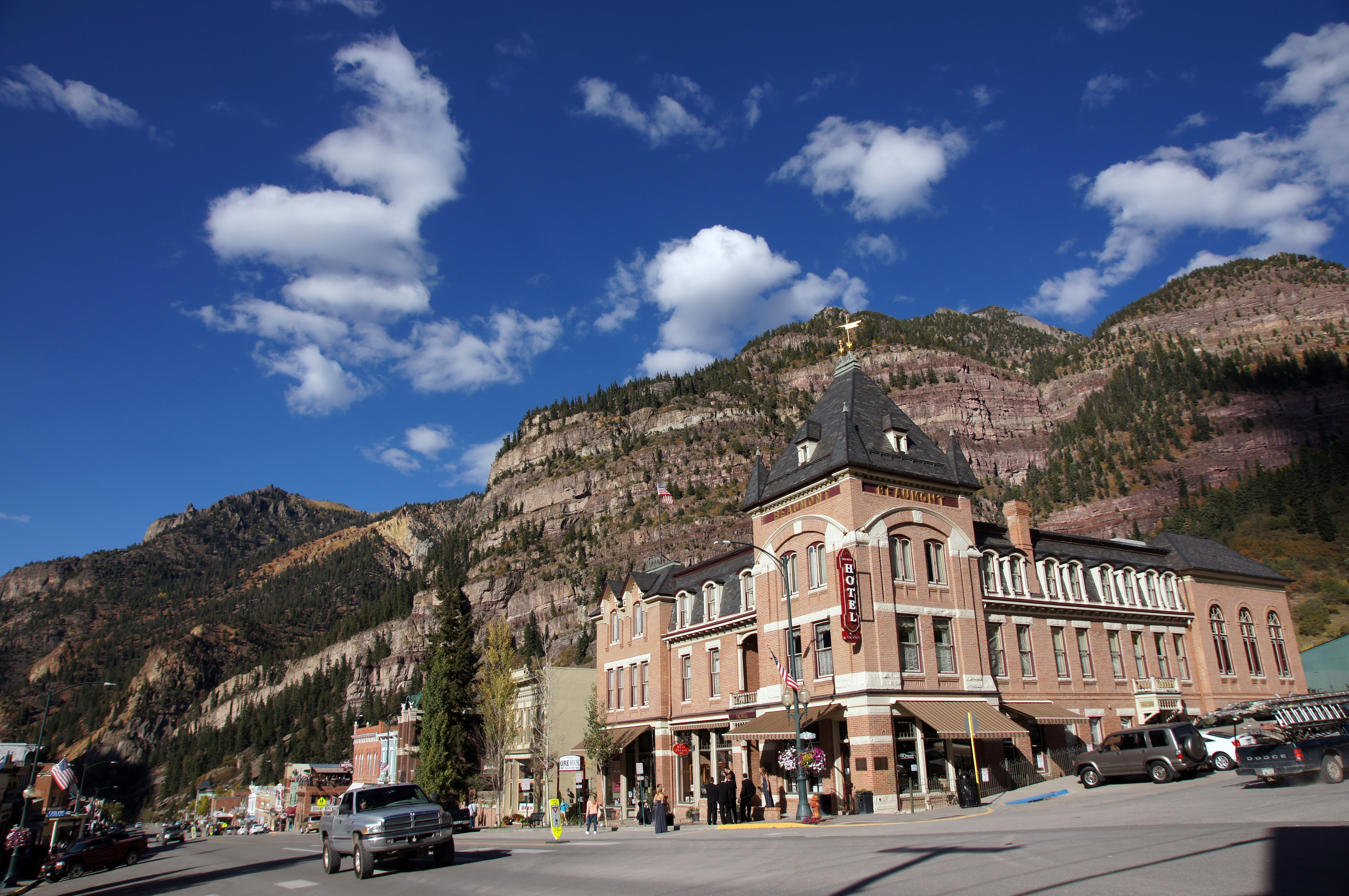
Beaumont Hotel on Main Street

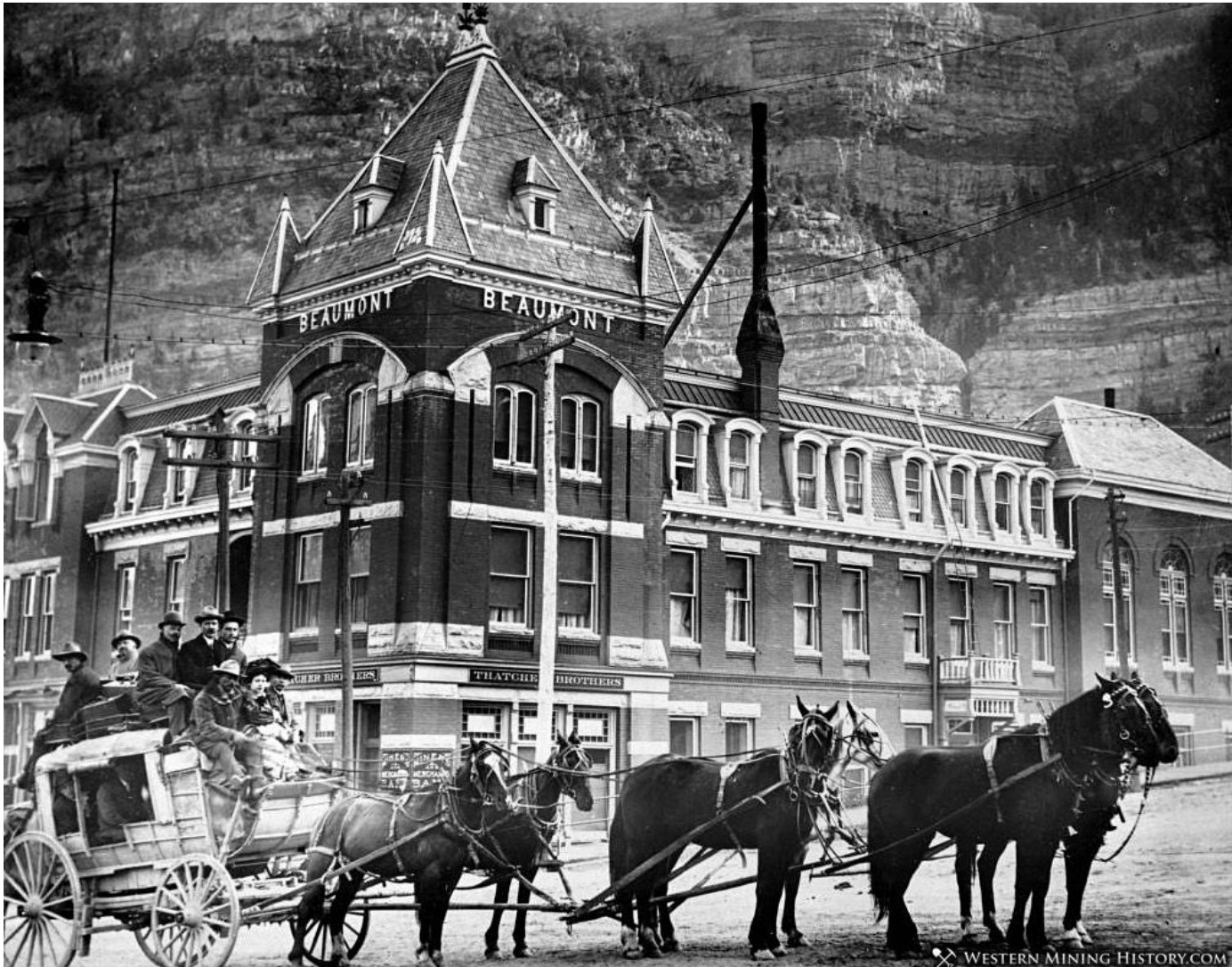
Stagecoach in front of the Beaumont Hotel, c. 1890

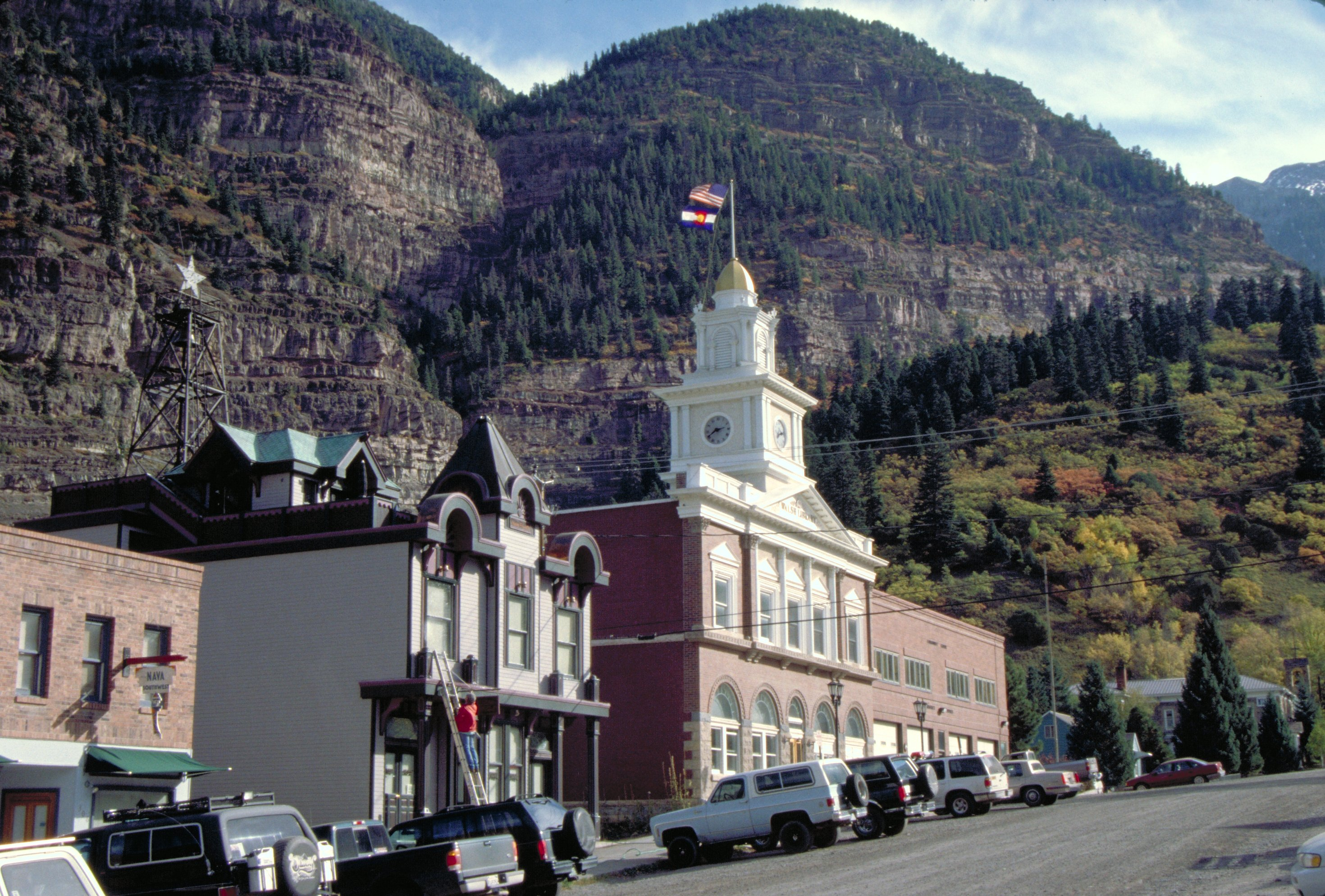
Ouray City Hall and fire station

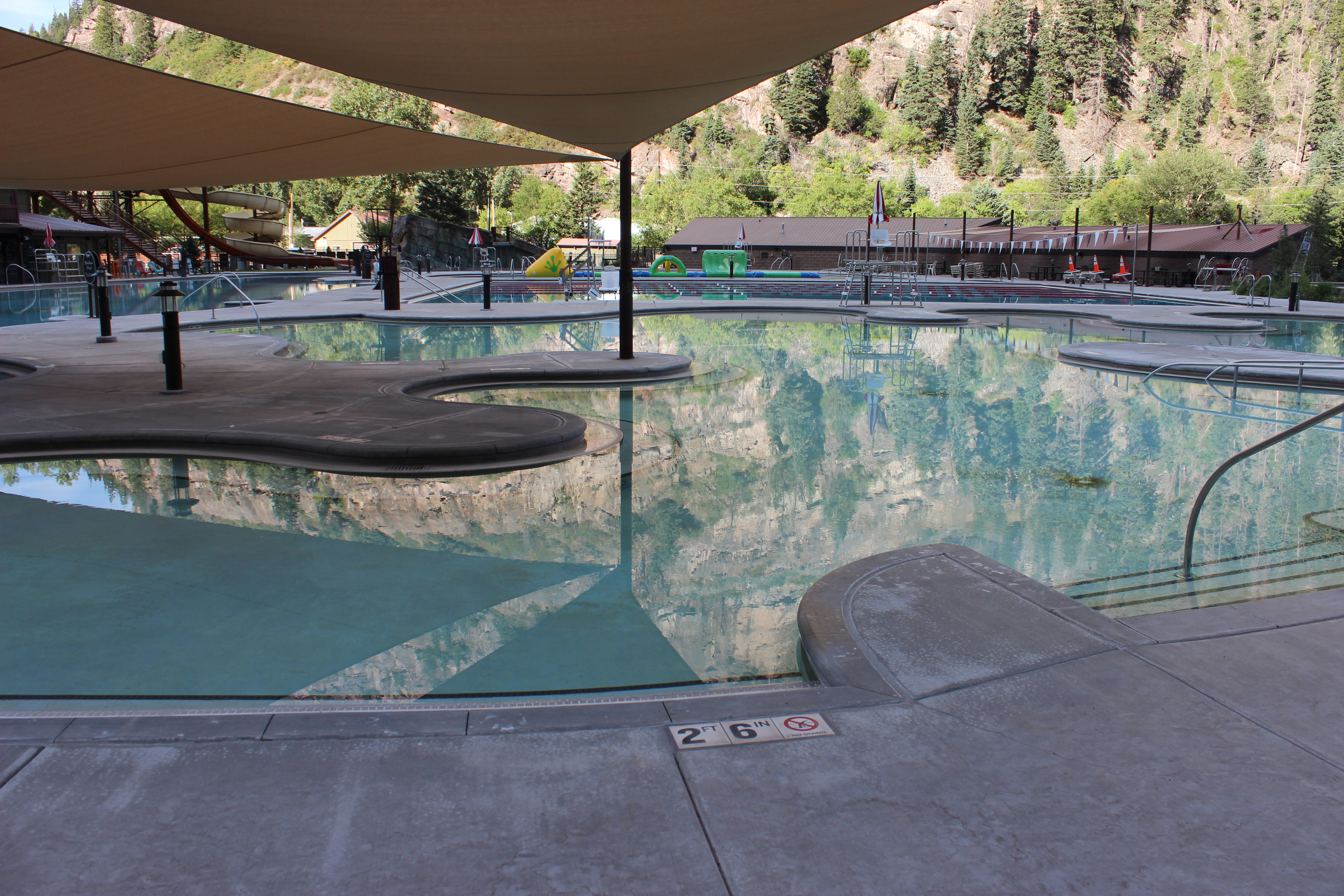
The Ouray Hot Springs Pool, renovated in 2018

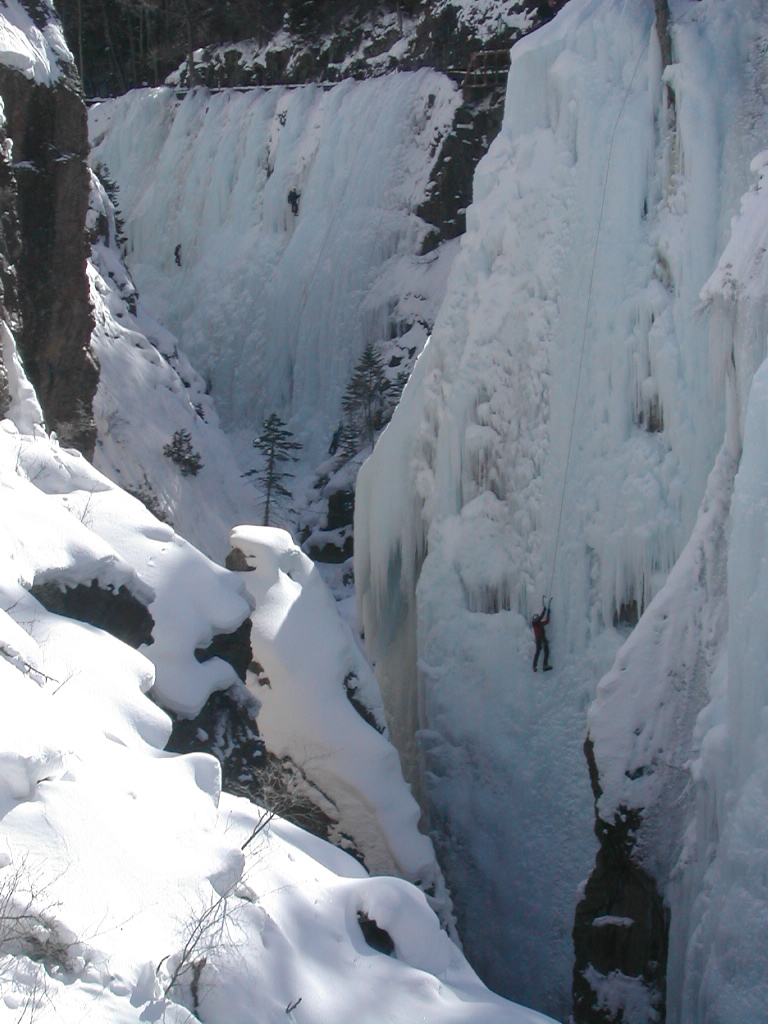
Ice climbers at the Ouray Ice Park in the Uncompahgre Gorge

The majority of Ouray's economy is based on tourism. Ouray bills itself as the "Switzerland of America" because of its setting at the narrow head of a valley, enclosed on three and a half sides by steep mountains.

Much of the town tourism is focused on ice climbing, mountain biking, hiking, trail running and off-roading in four-wheel drive (4WD) expeditions into the San Juan Mountains. Ouray has also become a popular destination for motorcyclists, as it marks the beginning of the Million Dollar Highway. This stretch of highway connects Ouray to its neighboring cities of Silverton and Durango. The Million Dollar Highway is frequently regarded as one of the most beautiful roads in Colorado, but is also considered one of the most dangerous due to its sharp turns, steep ledges, and lack of guard rails. Destinations include Yankee Boy Basin, Engineer Mountain, and Black Bear Road. Recording artist (and later Ouray mayor) C. W. McCall helped make Black Bear famous in the area. His song "Black Bear Road" borrowed the phrase, "you don't have to be crazy to drive this road, but it helps", from a sign once posted somewhere at the beginning of Black Bear Pass.

Ouray is a popular destination for ice climbing. The world's first ice climbing park, expanding on previously popular natural falls, consists of dozens of frozen waterfalls from 80 to 200 feet (61 m) high farmed along more than a mile of the Uncompahgre Gorge. The water is supplied by a sprinkler system developed and maintained by a volunteer organization and supported by donations from local businesses, gear manufacturers and climbers. The Ouray Ice Park is free and attracts climbers from around the world. The annual Ice Festival is a weekend-long extravaganza of contests, exhibitions and instruction with many of the world's top ice climbers. Ice climbing has been a boon to the local economy as well, with hotels and restaurants that previously closed through the winter months now staying open to accommodate climbers.

There are five developed hot springs in Ouray and nearby Ridgway. These include thermal pools and vapor caves. Ouray Hot Springs is the largest facility with numerous pools.

There are numerous waterfalls along the road from Durango to Ouray, and within the city limits there are two waterfalls within easy reach. Cascade Falls is a short, 1/4 mile hike accessible from a parking lot on 8th Avenue. Box Canyon Falls is at the southwest edge of Ouray.

Ouray was originally a mining town. The largest and most famous mine is the Camp Bird Mine, the second-largest gold mine in Colorado, established by Thomas Walsh in 1896. Even though there was an operation permit filed in 2007, the mine still remains inactive. During its lifespan, the mine produced about 1.5 million troy ounces of gold, and 4 million troy ounces of silver, from 1896 to 1990. In 1995 the old milling equipment "The Crusher" was disassembled and sold to a smaller mine located in Mongolia where it operated for about two years. The vacant mine can be seen on the steep two-wheel drive road leading to the four-wheel drive roads to Yankee Boy Basin and Imogene Pass.

== Demographics ==
Historical population
Census	Pop.	Note	%±
1880	864		—
1890	2,534		193.3%
1900	2,196		−13.3%
1910	1,644		−25.1%
1920	1,165		−29.1%
1930	707		−39.3%
1940	951		34.5%
1950	1,089		14.5%
1960	785		−27.9%
1970	741		−5.6%
1980	684		−7.7%
1990	644		−5.8%
2000	813		26.2%
2010	1,000		23.0%
2020	898		−10.2%
U.S. Decennial Census

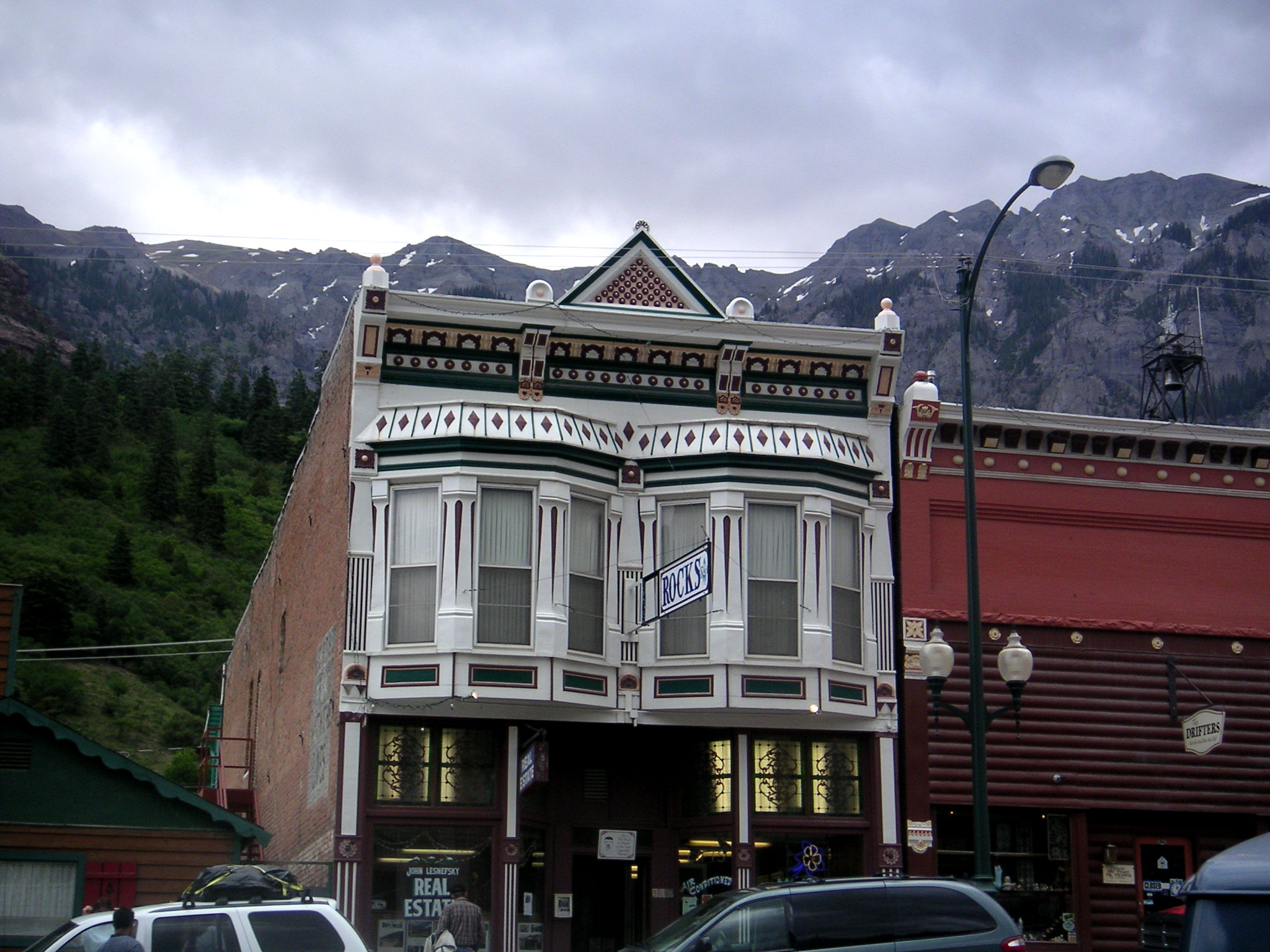
Downtown building in Ouray

As of the census of 2010, there were 1,000 people, 457 households, and 283 families residing in the city. The population density was 1,250 inhabitants per square mile (480/km^{2}). There were 800 housing units at an average density of 1,000 units per square mile (390 units/km^{2}). The racial makeup of the city was 95.2% White, 0.1% (1) African American, 0.4% (4) Native American, 0.8% (8) Asian, 1.9% (19) from other races, and 1.6% (16) from two or more races. Hispanic or Latino of any race were 8.2% of the population.

There were 457 households, out of which 26.5% had children under the age of 18 living with them, 48.1% were married couples living together, 7.7% had a female householder with no husband present, 6.1% had a male householder with no wife present, and 38.1% were non-families. 32.4% of all households were made up of individuals, and 10.9% had someone living alone who was 65 years of age or older. The average household size was 2.19 and the average family size was 2.76.

In the city, the population was spread out, with 21.7% under the age of 18, 28.1% from 18 to 44, 33.2% from 45 to 64, and 17.0% who were 65 years of age or older. The median age was 45.1 years. For every 100 females, there were 101.6 males. For every 100 females age 18 and over, there were 101.8 males.

The median income for a household in the city was $36,094, and the median income for a family was $45,313. Males had a median income of $35,217 versus $27,083 for females. The per capita income for the city was $23,127. About 9.3% of families and 8.1% of the population were below the poverty line, including 7.1% of those under age 18 and 6.4% of those age 65 or over.

== Transportation ==
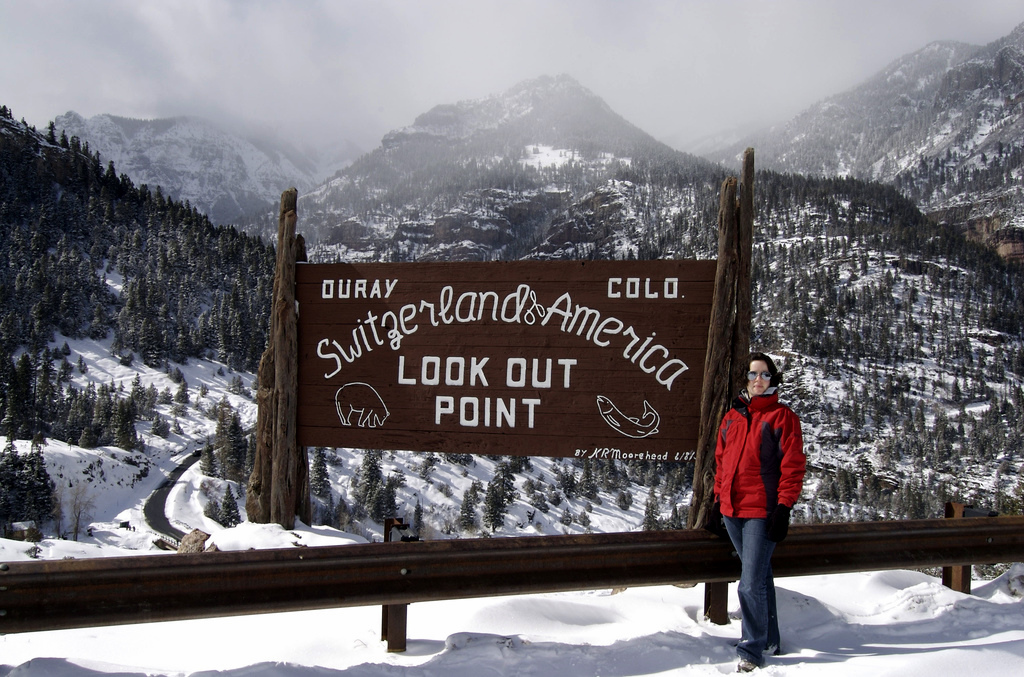
Switzerland of America sign on the "Million Dollar Highway"

The nearest airport with scheduled service is Montrose Regional Airport, located approximately 40 miles (64 km) to the north.

US 550 is the only paved road into or out of Ouray. U.S. 550 begins roughly 40 miles (64 km) north of Ouray in Montrose. It runs south to Bernalillo, New Mexico, via Durango, Colorado, and Aztec, New Mexico. The stretch of U.S. 550 that runs south from Ouray to Silverton is known as the "Million Dollar Highway".

== In popular culture ==
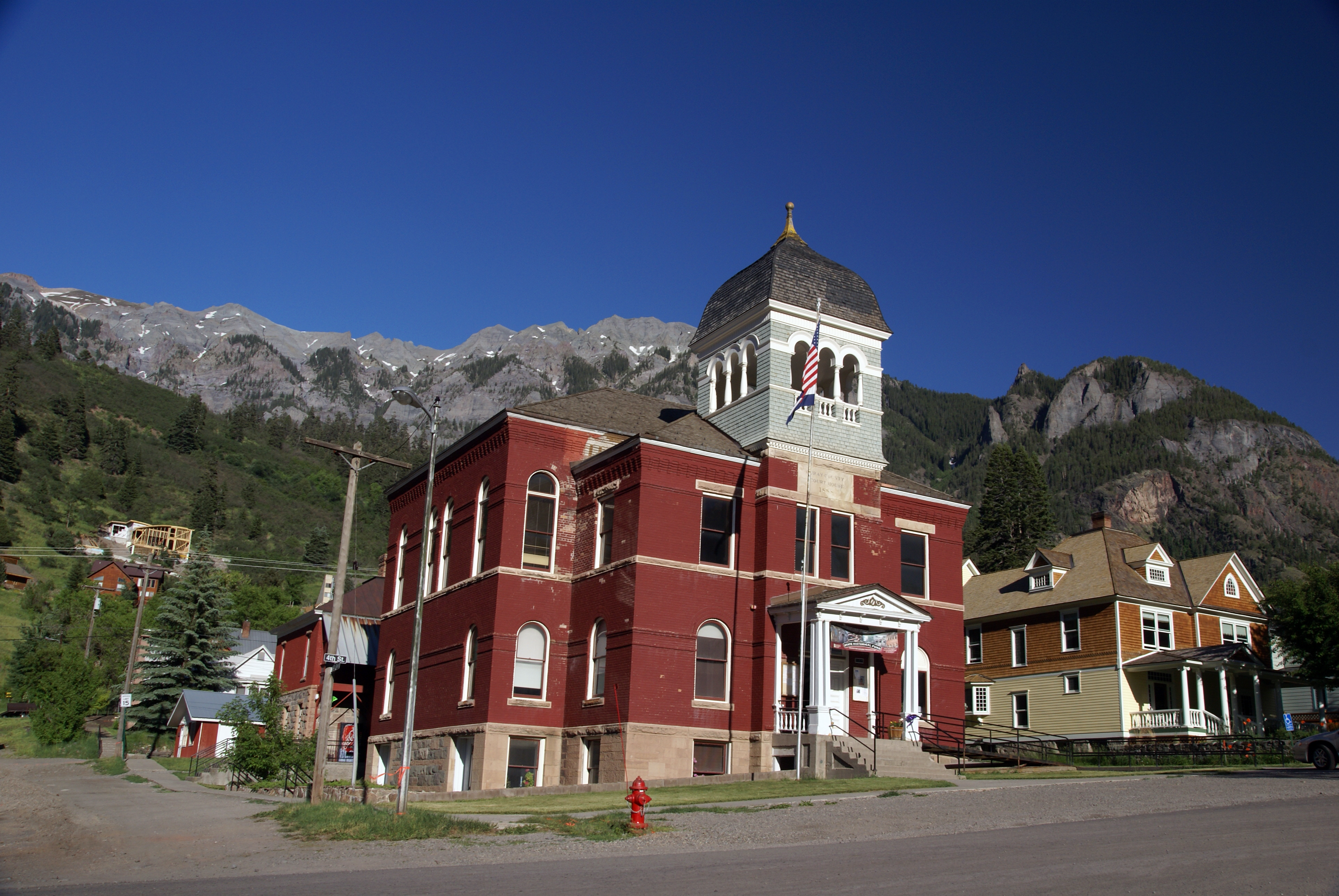
Ouray County Courthouse where scenes from True Grit were filmed in 1968

- In Ayn Rand's novel Atlas Shrugged, the protagonist's secret hideaway was located in an unnamed valley in the Rocky Mountains called Mulligan's Valley or "Galt's Gulch." Rand later said that Galt's Gulch was inspired by Ouray, where Rand found inspiration to complete the novel.
- Major League baseball pitcher Smoky Joe Wood was born in Kansas City but grew up in Ouray.
- In Chuck Wendig's novel Wanderers, Ouray is the destination selected by Black Swan (An AI super computer) as the destination for its sleepwalkers to wait out the pandemic 'White Mask' and rebuild civilization. Parts of the novel are set in a simulation of Ouray and towards the end, in Ouray itself.

== Notable people ==
- Gerald Waring (1883–1971) – geologist and hydrologist
- C. W. McCall (1928-2022) – Musician and Mayor of Ouray

== See also ==
- Ouray County Plaindealer local weekly newspaper
- Ouray Hydroelectric Power Plant
- San Juan Skyway Scenic and Historic Byway
- Milton Cline, early pioneer and prospector
