= Ouray Historic District =

Historic district in Colorado, United States

- U.S. National Register of Historic Places
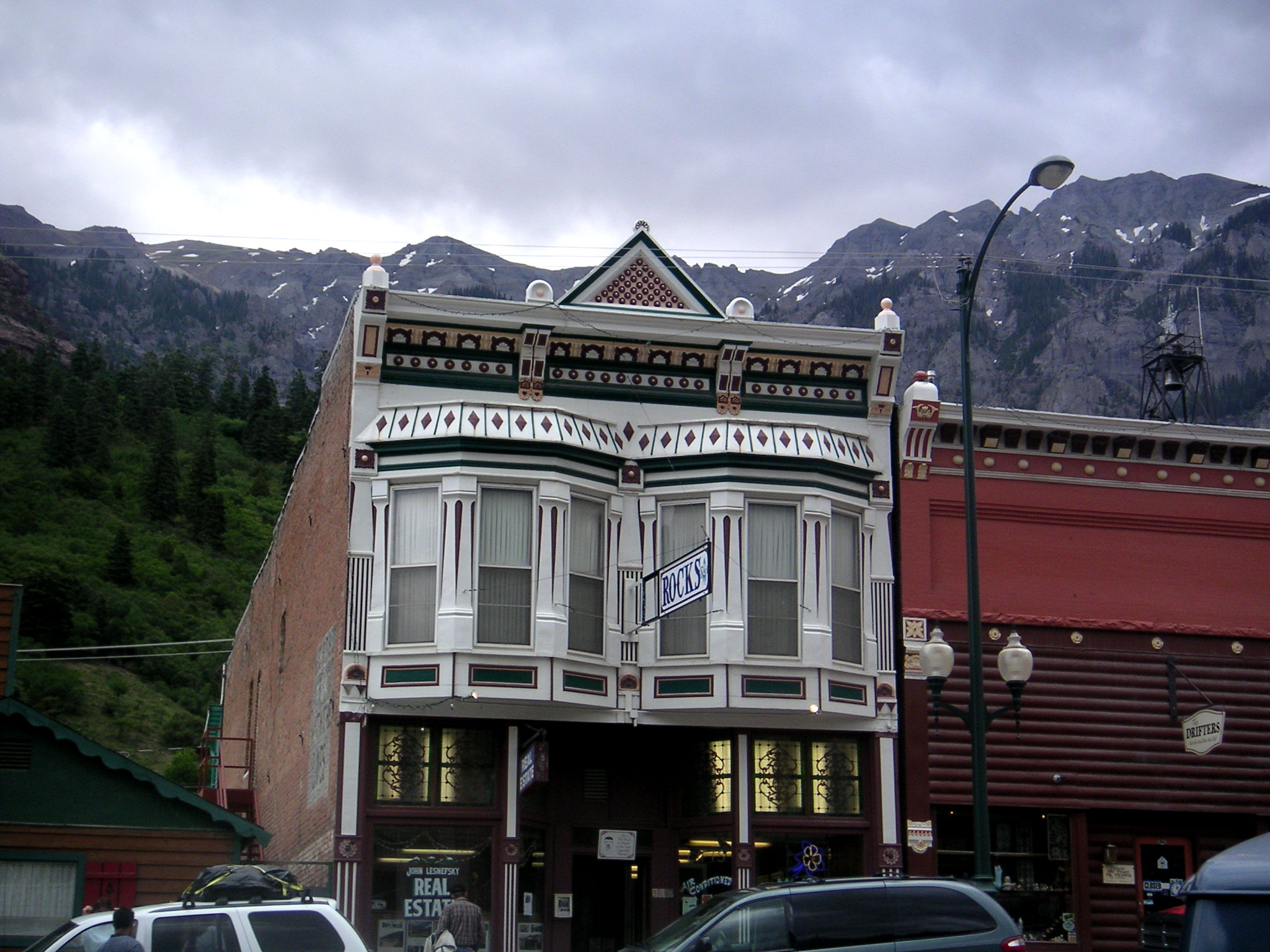

- Location within Colorado
- Location: U.S. Highway 550, Ouray, Colorado
- Coordinates: 38.0228°N 107.6733°W
- Area: 114 acres (0.46 km^{2})
- Architectural style: Italianate; Late Victorian
- NRHP reference No.: 83003537
- Added to NRHP: October 6, 1983

The Ouray Historic District, in Ouray, Colorado, is a 114-acre (0.46 km^{2}) historic district which was listed on the National Register of Historic Places in 1983. Many of the commercial buildings are Italianate in style; many residences are Victorian.

Its 270 contributing buildings include government and commercial buildings:

- Ouray County Courthouse (1881)
- Beaumont Hotel (1886)
- Wright Opera House (1888), with an elaborate Mesker Brothers cast-iron facade
- Duckett's Market
- St. Elmo Hotel (1899)
- Story Block (1892)

Many of the commercial buildings are along Ouray's Main Street, also known as Third Street, which is U.S. Highway 550.

Residences include:

- Hurlbutt House (1888)

The historic district encompasses almost all of the original townsite. Its boundary is an irregular pattern extending to and including the Ouray hot springs pool on the north, to the west side of Oak Street on the west side of the Uncompahgre River on the west, to the south side of Third Avenue on the south, and to the east side of 6th Street on the east.

Photos
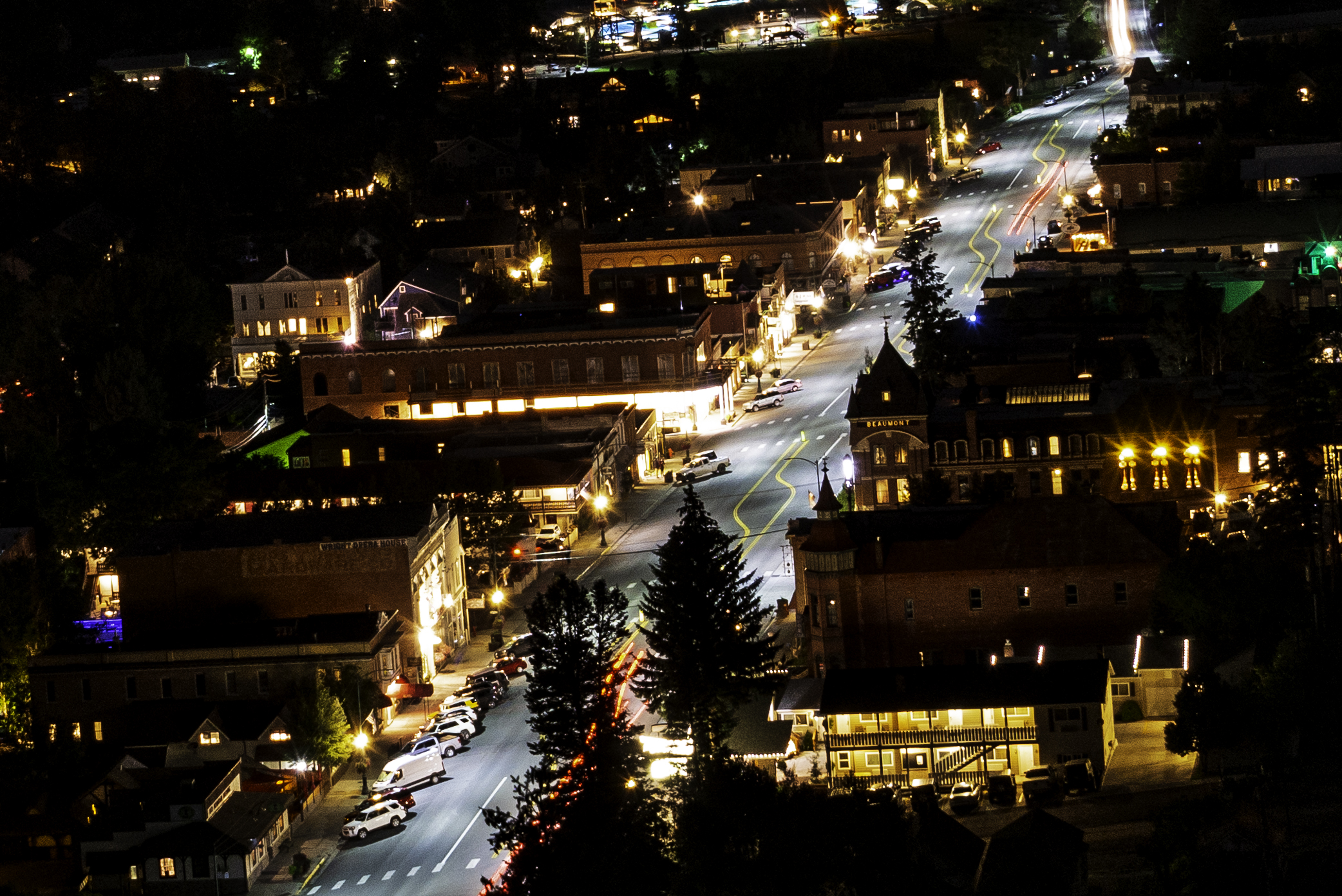
Main Street at night, with Beaumont Hotel in foreground

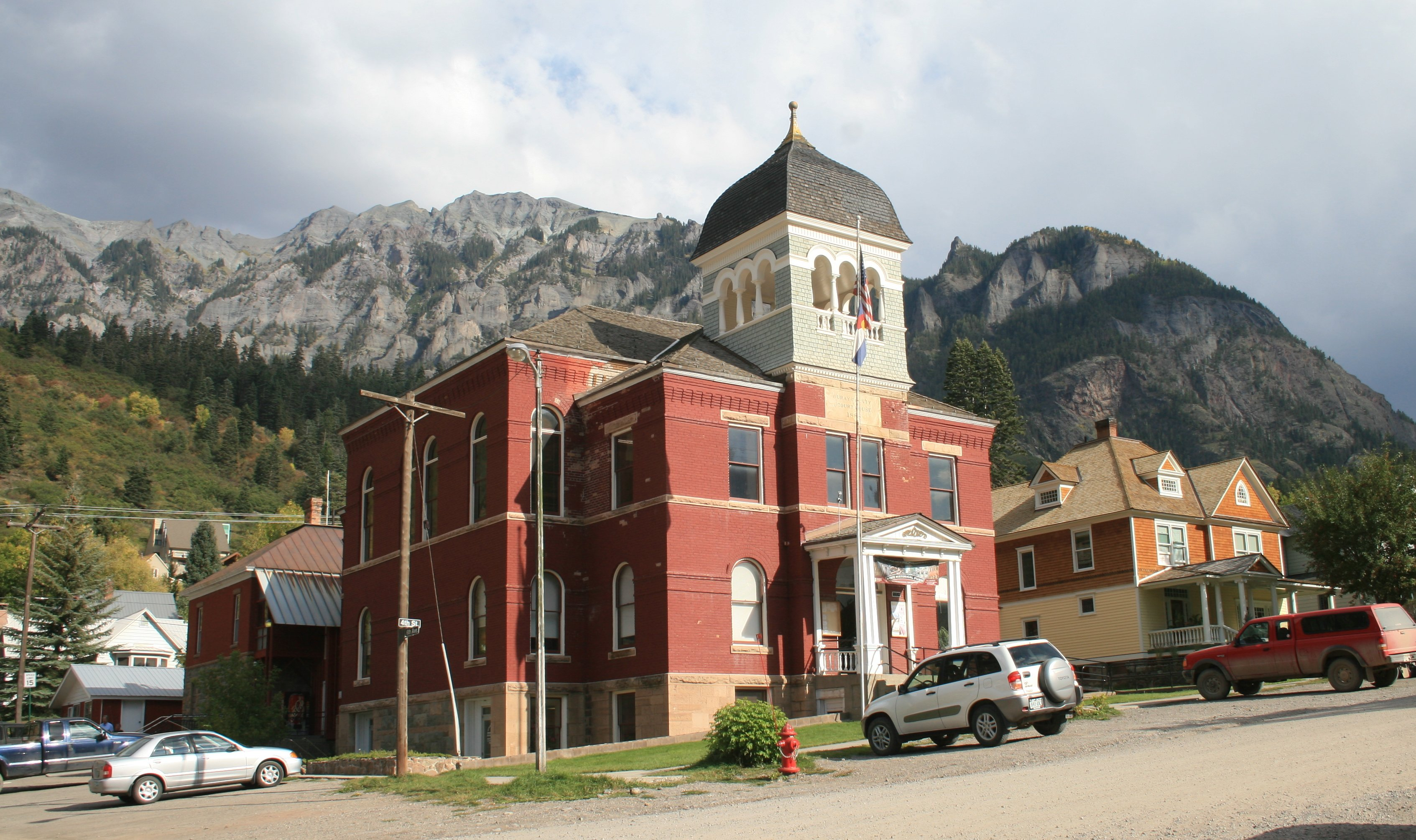
Ouray County Courthouse (1881)

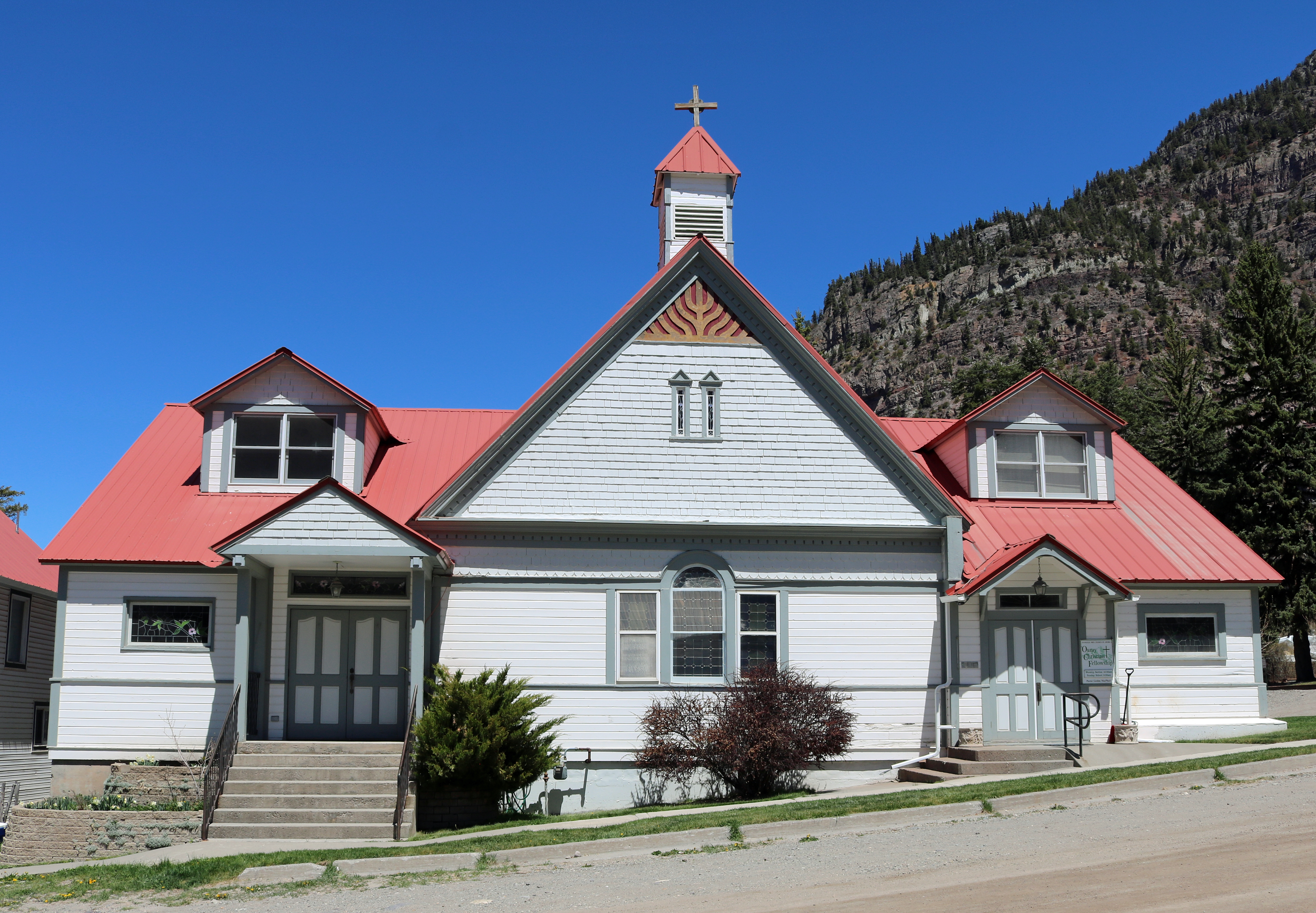
First Presbyterian Church, oldest church in Ouray

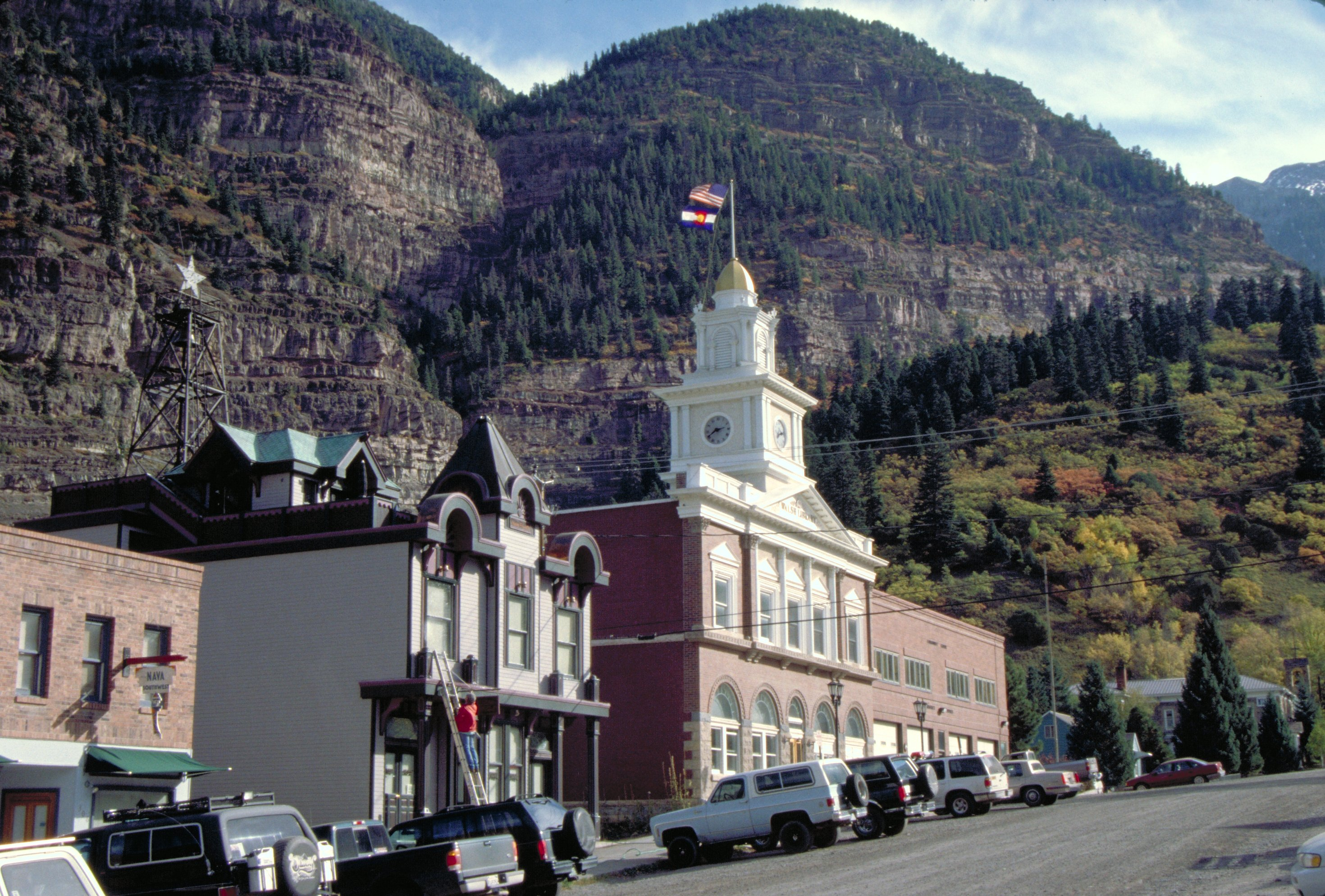
City hall and fire station

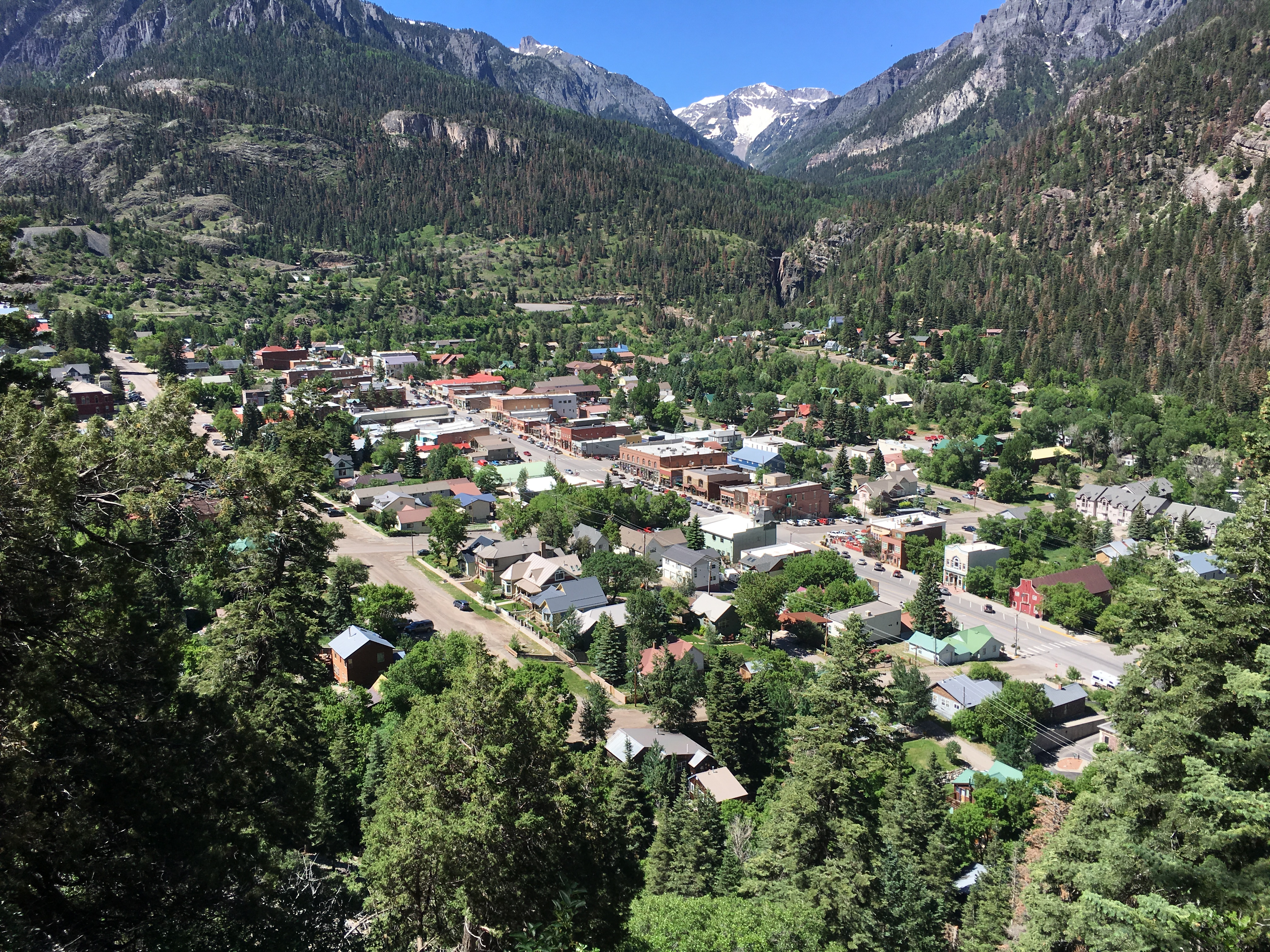
General view from northeast

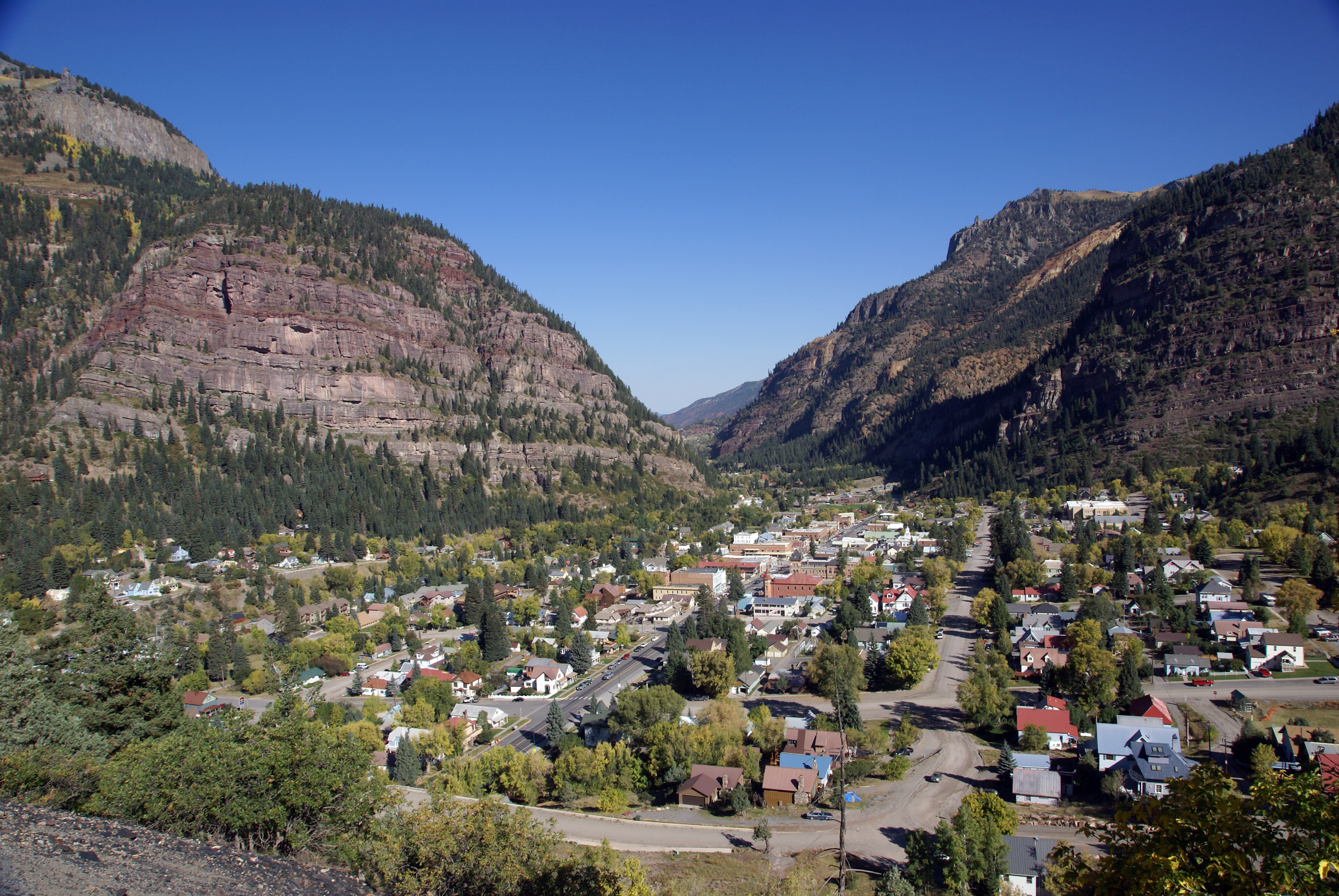
General view from south
