= Ajax Peak =

Mountain summit in Colorado, US

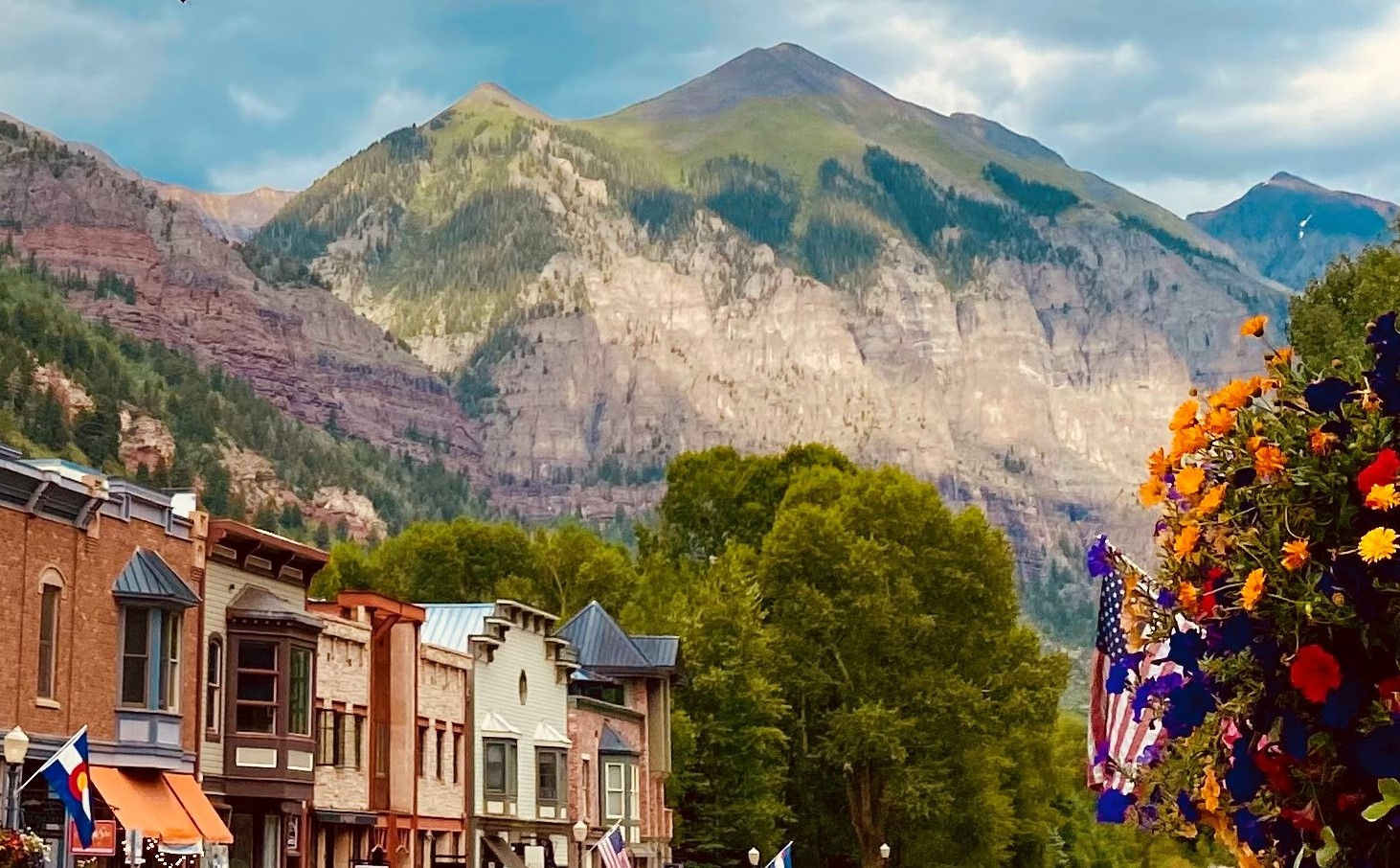
- West aspect, from Telluride

Highest point
- Elevation: 12,785 ft (3,897 m)
- Prominence: 105 ft (32 m)
- Parent peak: Chicago Peak (13,385 ft)
- Isolation: 1.16 mi (1.87 km)
- Coordinates: 37°55′43″N 107°45′20″W

Naming
- Etymology: Ajax the Great

Geography
- Location within Colorado Location within the United States
- Location: San Miguel County; Colorado, US
- Parent range: Rocky Mountains; San Juan Mountains
- Topo map: USGS Telluride

Climbing
- Easiest route: Hiking trail

Ajax Peak is a 12,785-foot-elevation (3,897-meter) mountain summit located in San Miguel County of southwest Colorado, United States. It is situated on land managed by Uncompahgre National Forest, and is the iconic landmark visible three miles east of the community of Telluride. Ajax is set immediately south of Savage Basin and the ghost town of Tomboy, one mile southwest of Chicago Peak, and one mile west of Telluride Peak. It is also immediately northeast of Bridal Veil Falls, Colorado's highest waterfall at 365-feet high. It is part of the San Juan Mountains which are a subset of the Rocky Mountains. Topographic relief is significant as the west aspect rises 3,800 feet (1,200 meters) above the box canyon in approximately one mile. The old mill town of Pandora at the base of Ajax Peak was hit by snow slides each winter, and one particularly bad event in 1884 came over the Ajax Mine and wrecked the mills.

== Climate ==
According to the Köppen climate classification system, Ajax Peak has an alpine subarctic climate with cold, snowy winters, and cool to warm summers. Due to its altitude, it receives precipitation all year, as snow in winter, and as thunderstorms in summer, with a dry period in late spring. Precipitation runoff from the mountain drains into tributaries and headwaters of the San Miguel River.

== Gallery ==
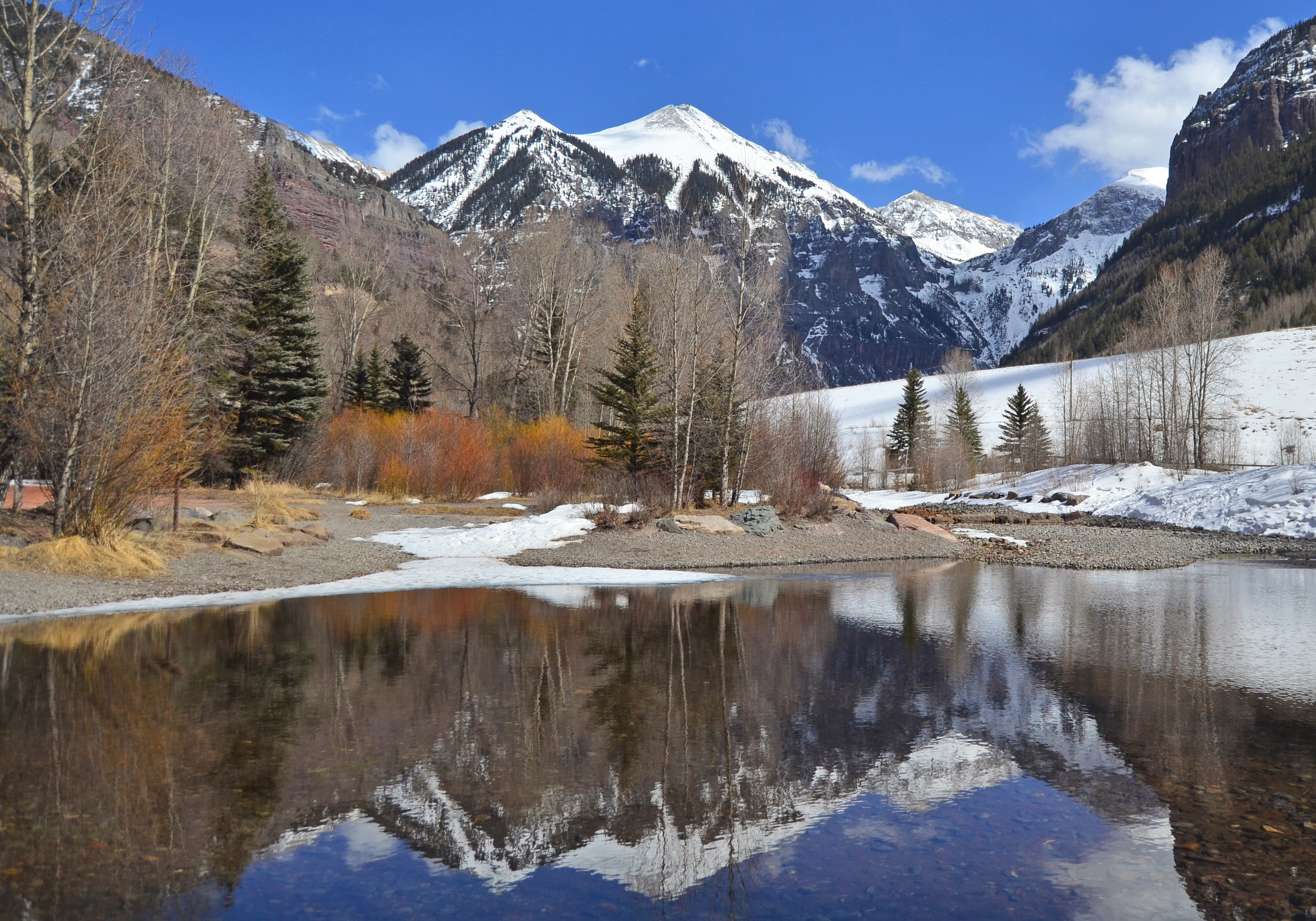
Ajax Peak's west aspect (centered) in late winter

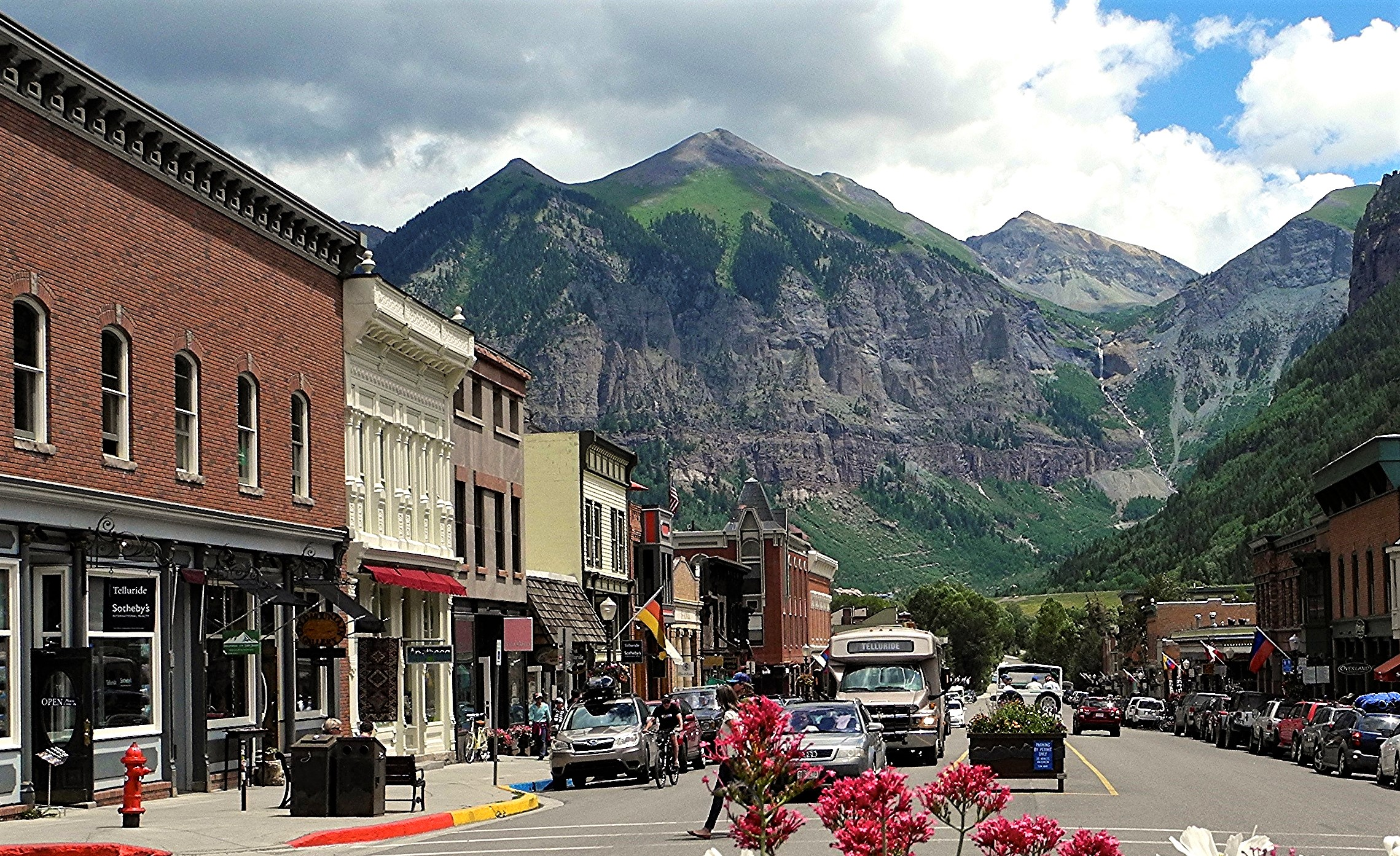
Ajax Peak from Telluride's Colorado Avenue

Detail of lower southwest cliffs of Ajax Peak

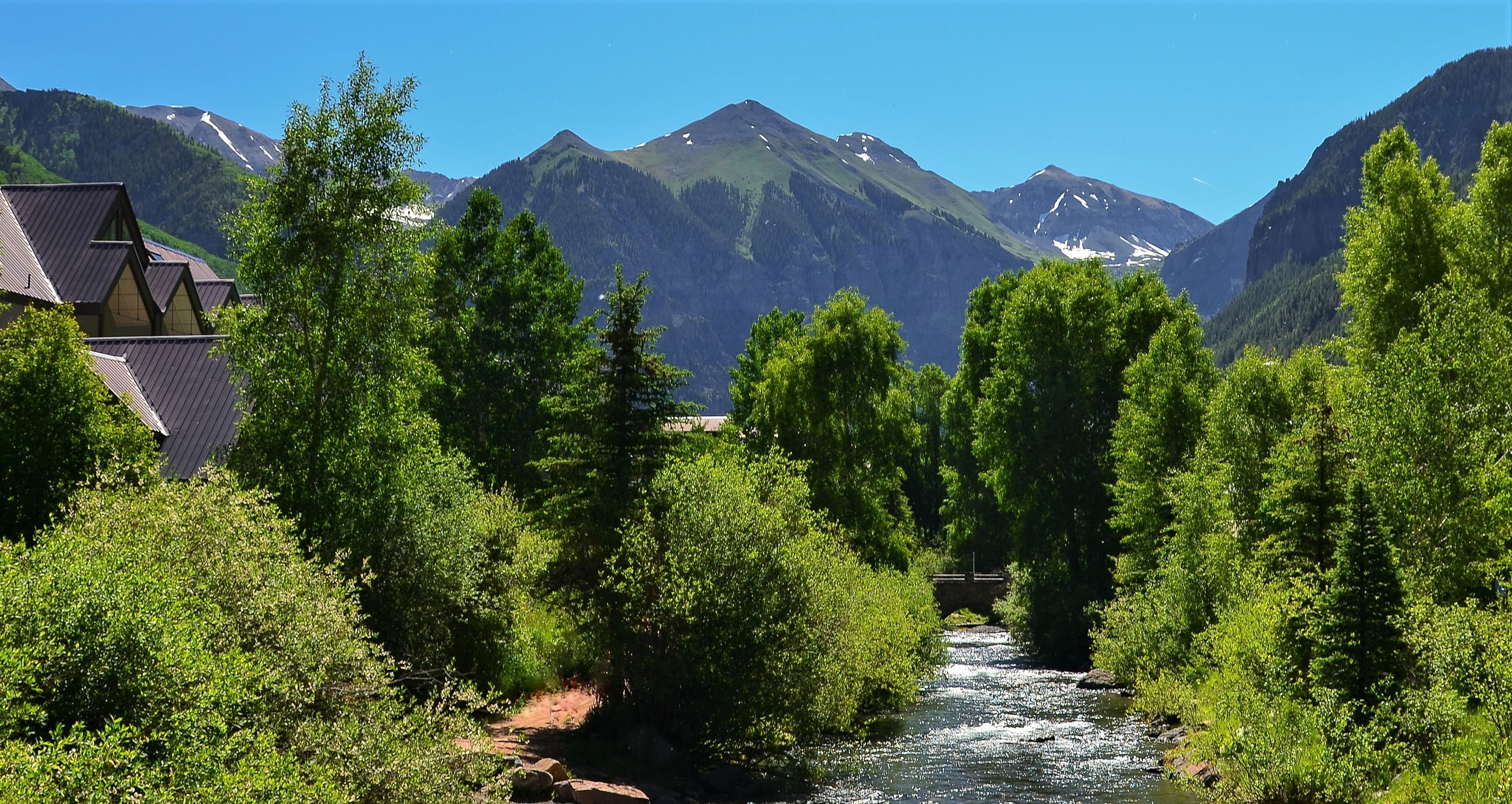
Ajax with San Miguel River

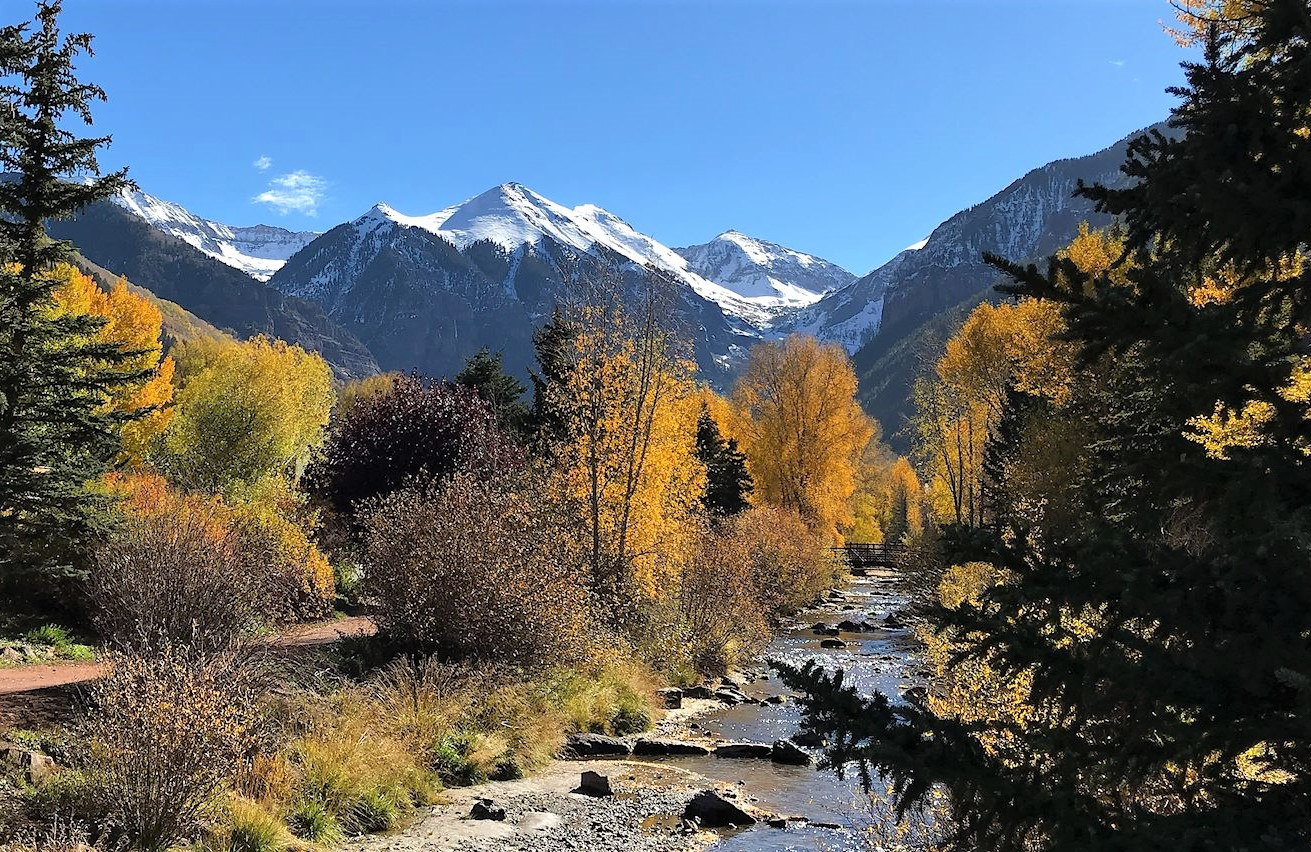
Ajax left of center, with San Miguel River

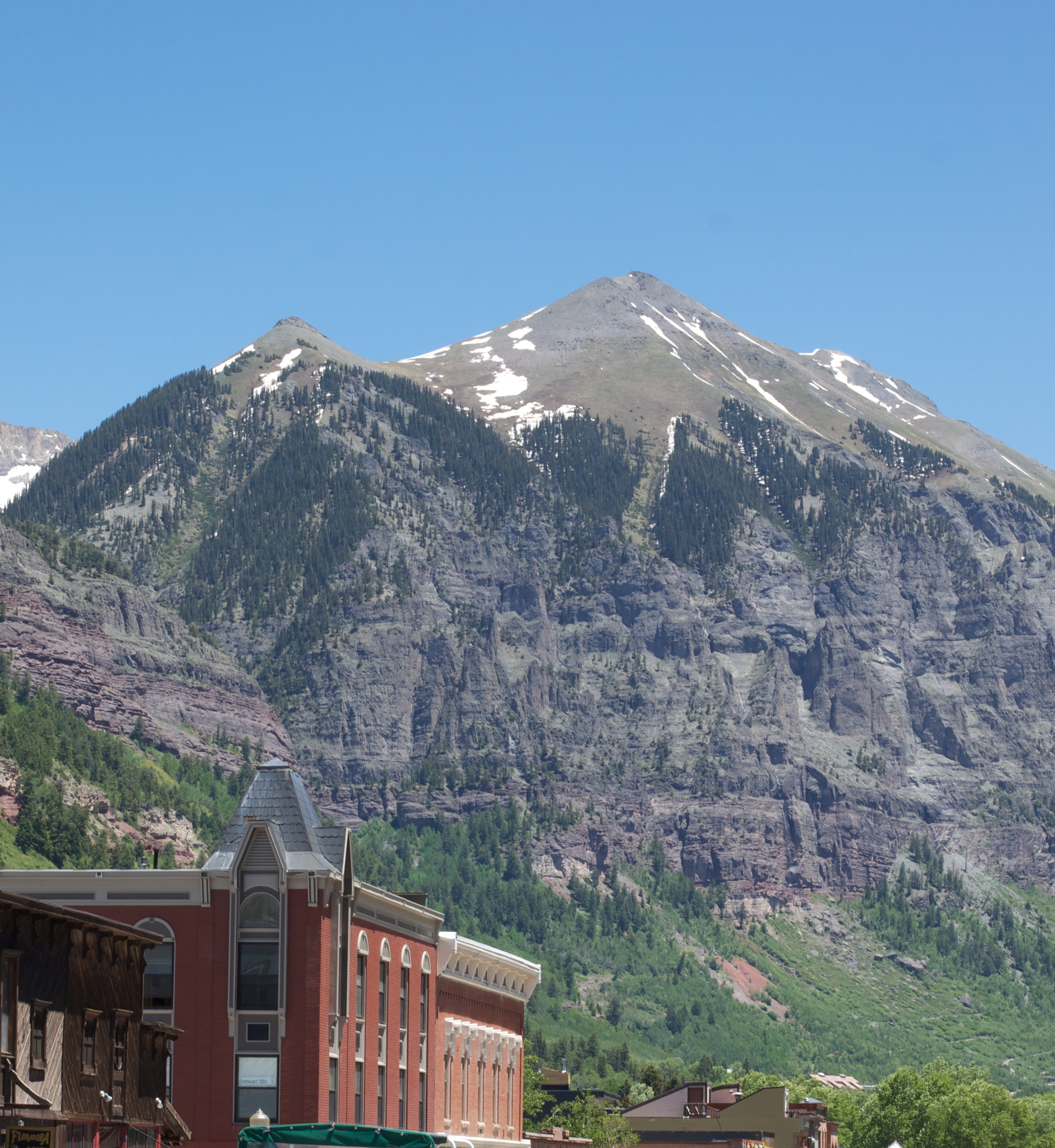

== See also ==
- Mountains of San Miguel County, Colorado
