= Chicago Peak =

Mountain in the state of Colorado

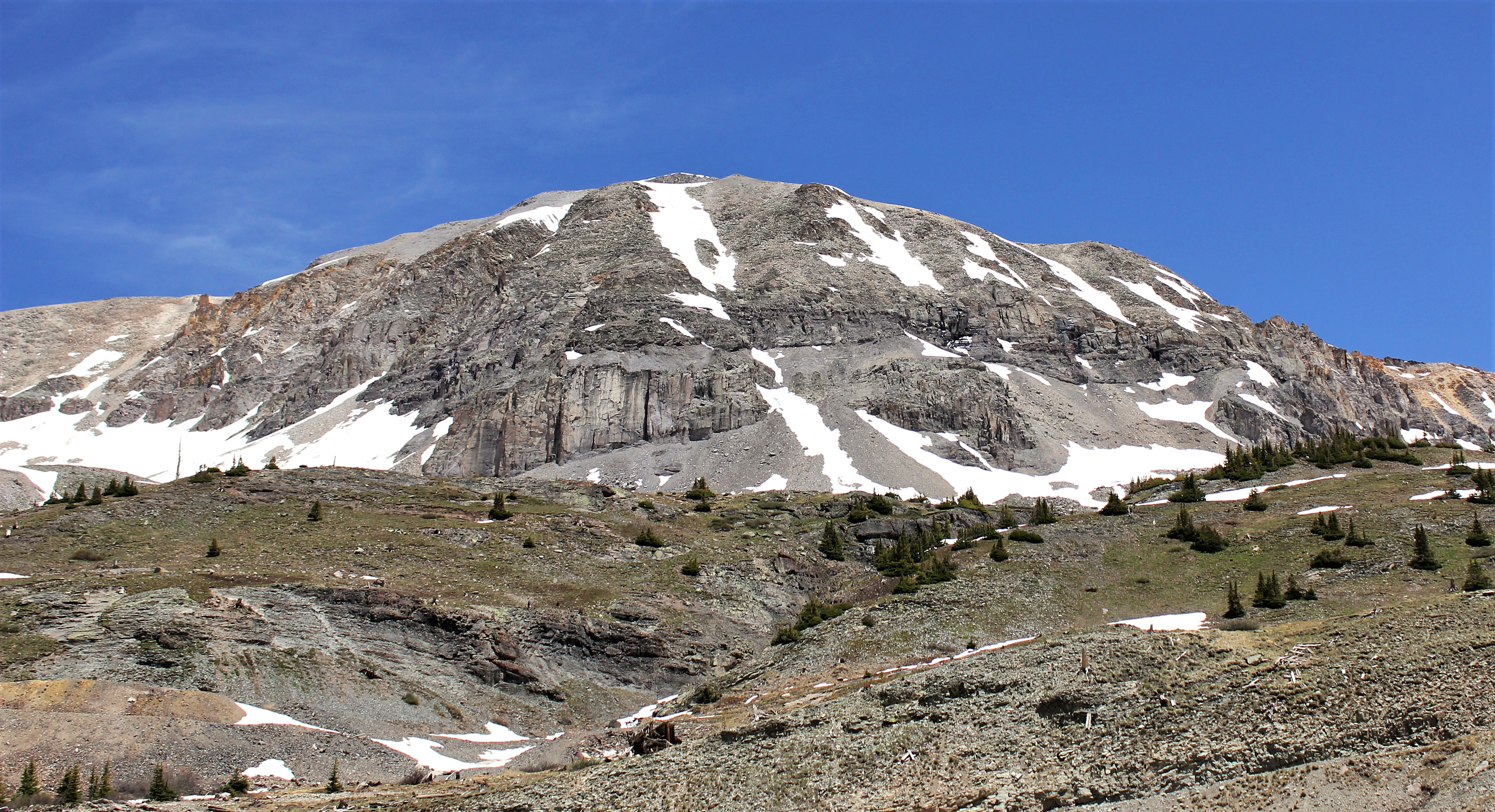
- South-southwest aspect

Highest point
- Elevation: 13,385 ft (4,080 m)
- Prominence: 345 ft (105 m)
- Parent peak: T 5 (13,436 ft)
- Isolation: 1.56 mi (2.51 km)
- Coordinates: 37°56′34″N 107°44′39″W

Geography
- Location within Colorado Location within the United States
- Location: Ouray County / San Miguel County; Colorado, US
- Parent range: Rocky Mountains; San Juan Mountains; Sneffels Range
- Topo map: USGS Ironton

Climbing
- Easiest route: class 2 via Imogene Pass

Chicago Peak is a 13,385-foot-elevation (4,080-meter) mountain summit located on the shared boundary of San Miguel County with Ouray County in southwest Colorado, United States. It is situated four miles (6.4 km) east of the community of Telluride, on land managed by Uncompahgre National Forest. It is part of the Sneffels Range which is a subset of the San Juan Mountains, which in turn are part of the Rocky Mountains. It is set above the ghost town of Tomboy, one mile (1.6 km) south of United States Mountain, and one mile northwest of Imogene Pass. Topographic relief is significant as the east aspect rises 2,000 feet (610 meters) above Imogene Basin in approximately one mile, and the west aspect rises 2,000 feet above Savage Basin in less than one mile. Mining activity in the immediate area produced significant amounts of gold and silver.

== Climate ==
According to the Köppen climate classification system, Chicago Peak is located in an alpine subarctic climate zone with cold, snowy winters, and cool to warm summers. Due to its altitude, it receives precipitation all year, as snow in winter, and as thunderstorms in summer, with a dry period in late spring. Precipitation runoff from the west side of the mountain drains into tributaries of the San Miguel River, and from the east side into tributaries of the Uncompahgre River.

== Gallery ==
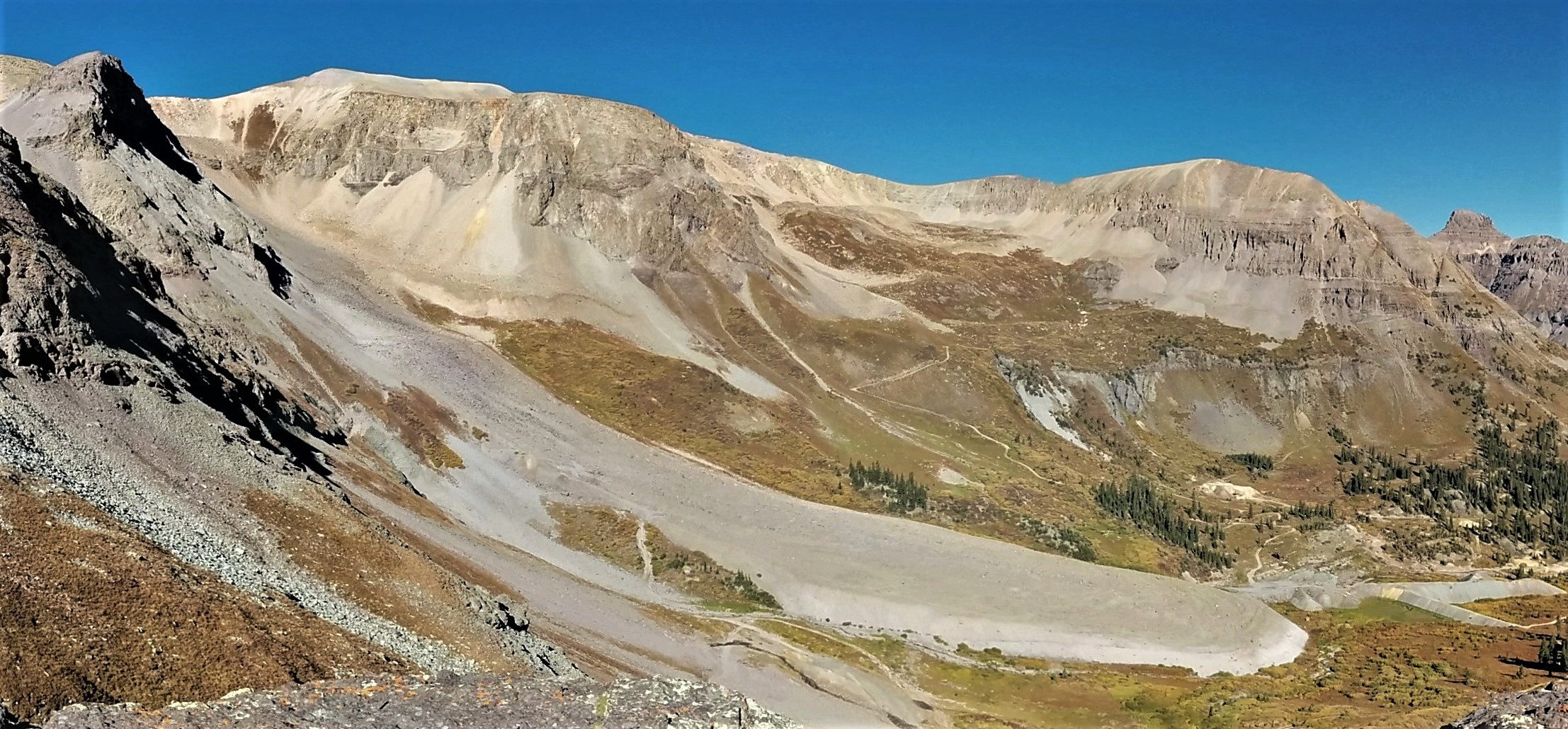
Chicago Peak (left) and United States Mountain (right) viewed from the east.

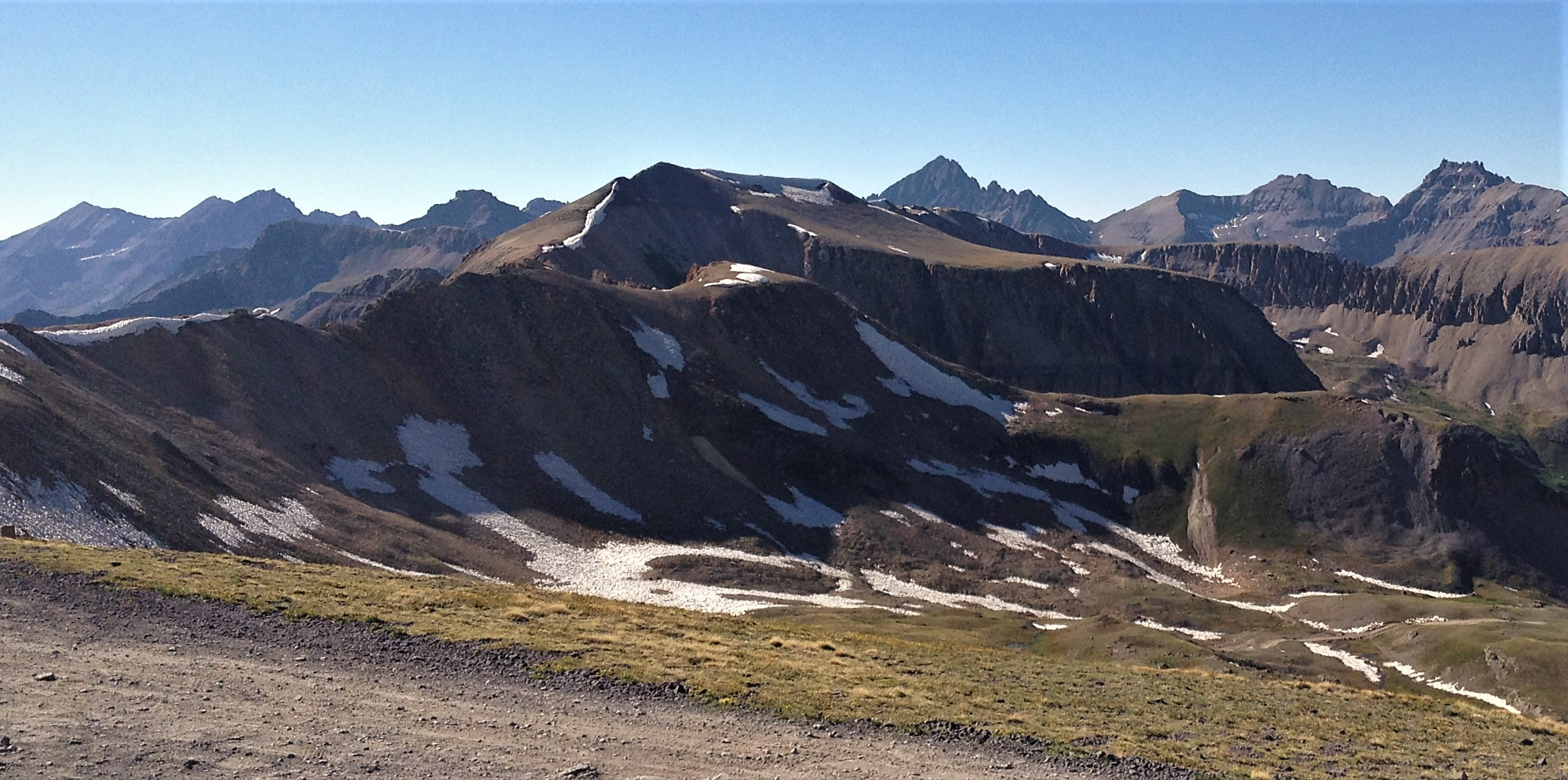
Chicago Peak, southeast aspect seen from Imogene Pass

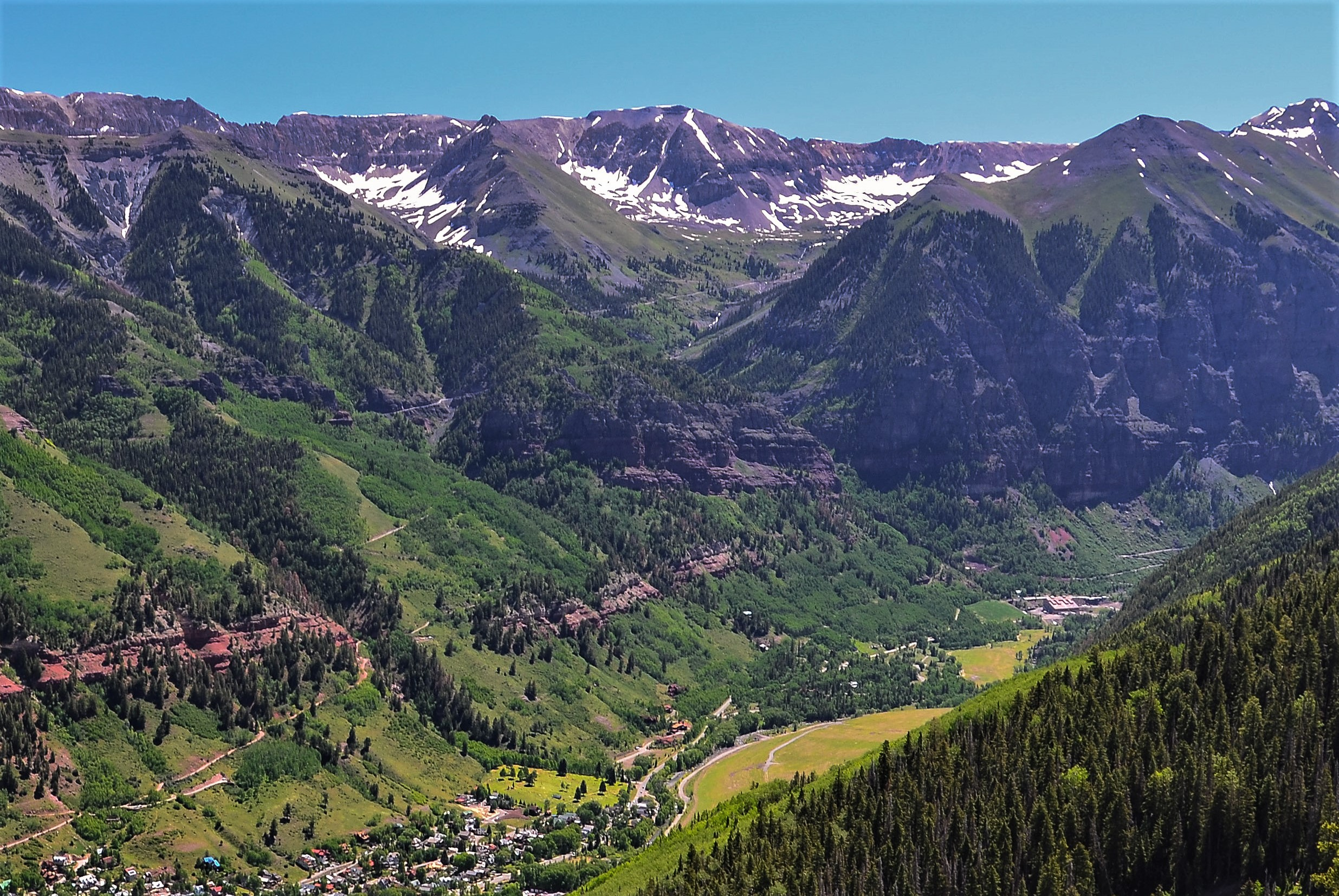
Chicago Peak centered at top of frame with Telluride set below

== See also ==
- Mountains of Ouray County, Colorado
- Mountains of San Miguel County, Colorado
