= Smuggler-Union Hydroelectric Power Plant =

- U.S. National Register of Historic Places
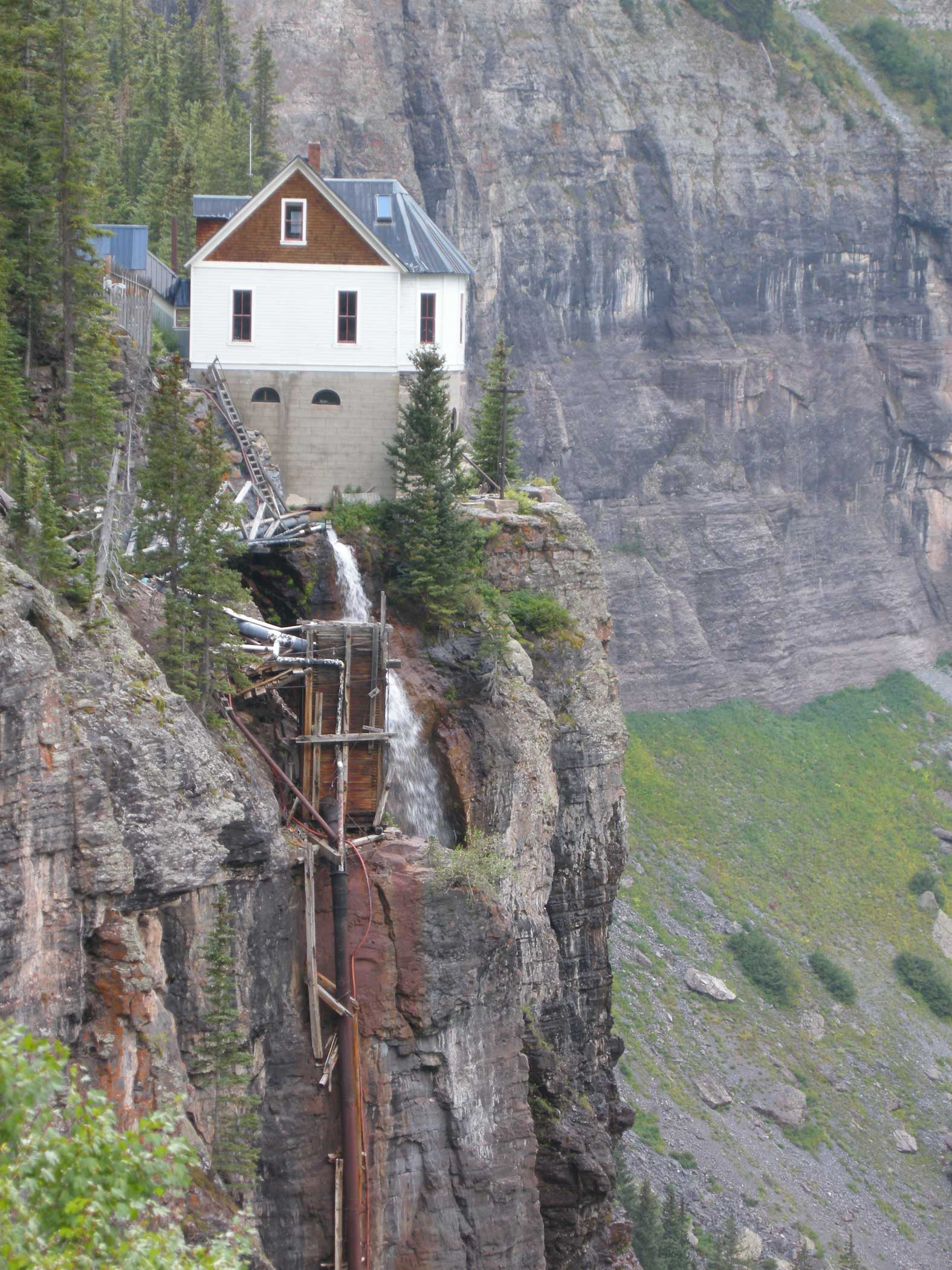

- Location within Colorado Location within the United States
- Location: Uncompahgre National Forest, San Miguel County, Colorado
- Nearest city: Telluride, Colorado
- Coordinates: 37°55′9″N 107°46′8″W
- Area: 0.5 acres (0.20 ha)
- Built: 1907
- NRHP reference No.: 79000621
- Added to NRHP: December 27, 1979

The Smuggler-Union Hydroelectric Powerplant, also known as the Bridal Veil Powerhouse, is an electric power generation plant and residence located next to Bridal Veil Falls on a 400-foot (120 m) cliff overlooking Telluride, Colorado. The structure is 2 1/2 stories on a poured concrete foundation with a wood frame superstructure. It consists of a main power plant building, a 1 1/2-story residence and a 1-story cookhouse. The power plant foundation is distinctive, with semicircular windows. A semicircular bay with arched windows projects out on a rock spur.

== History ==
The Smuggler-Union Hydroelectric Powerplant was built to power the Smuggler-Union Mine 2,000 feet (610 m) below in 1907, providing alternating current for industrial purposes. The plant was proposed by Smuggler-Union Mine manager Buckley Wells who lived in the residence as a summer home until the 1920s. It was originally accessed in winter by an aerial tramway but that was eventually destroyed. It operated in its original configuration until its decommissioning in 1953, serving the Idarado Mining Company.

The living quarters and especially the power house/generator fell into disrepair and were heavily vandalized by the time of the historic registry survey in 1979. A local resident, Eric Jacobson, acquired a 99-year lease from the Idarado Mining Company for the property in 1988 and proceeded to restore the building and its hydroelectric facility and eventually moved his family into the residence, raising three children at the precarious home. Jacobson restored the AC plant to operation in 1991 with power being generated by its original 2300 volt Westinghouse Electric AC generator, one of the oldest AC generators in operation. In 2010 Jacobson gave up the lease to the Idarado Mining Company citing continual regulation and legal problems associated with the site. Idarado has not kept the plant in operation, depriving the community of this readily available source of renewable power generation. As of 2012, under Jacobson's care, the plant generated approximately 2,000 megawatt hours per year – enough electricity to power about 2,000 average American homes – which was purchased from Jacobson by the local San Miguel Power Association. Because the Bridal Veil Hydroelectric Power Plant is over 100 years old, restoring the generator to operation is a difficult feat.

The Smuggler-Union Powerplant was placed on the National Register of Historic Places on December 27, 1979.

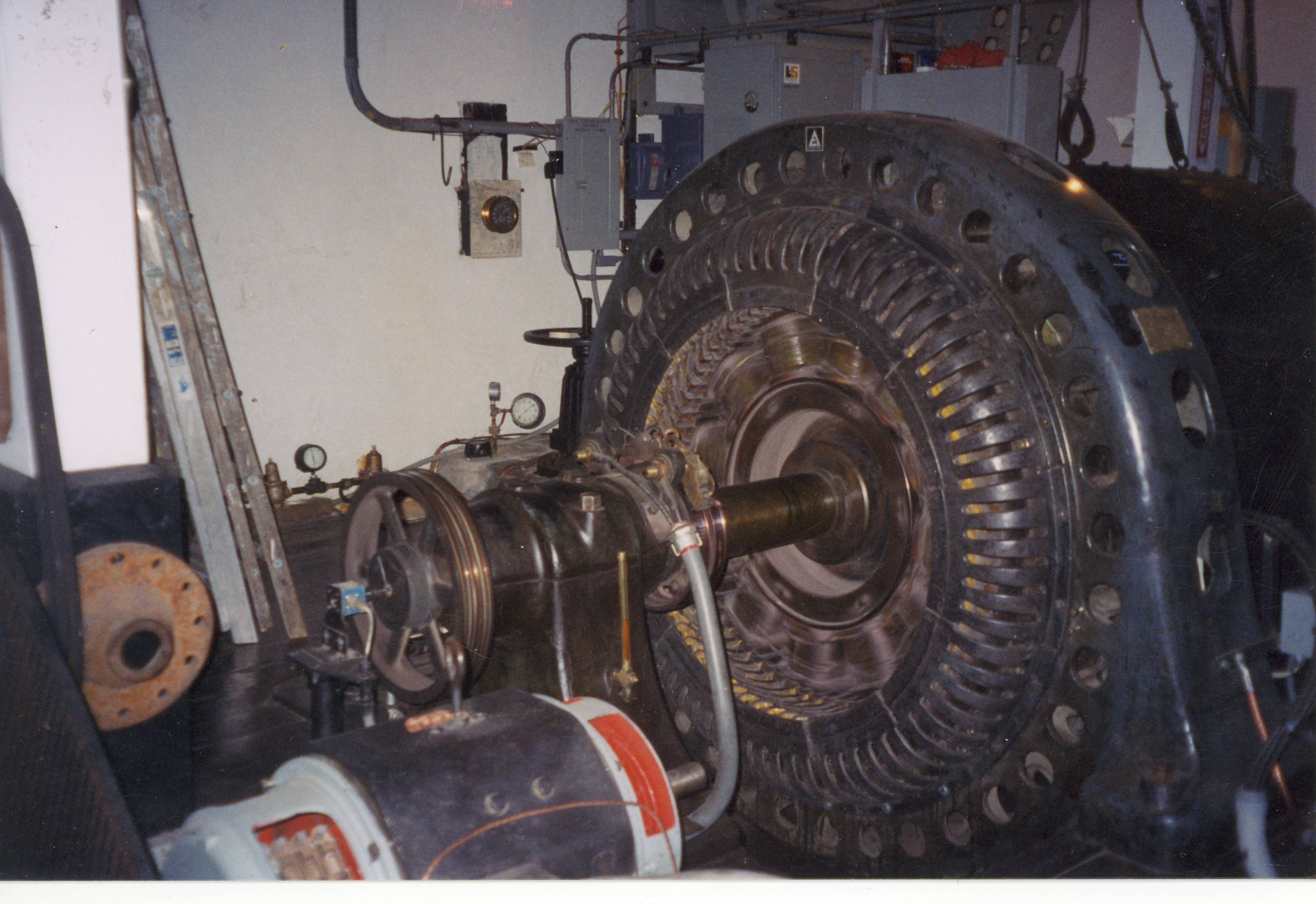
Generator in the Smuggler-Union powerhouse, one of the oldest still operating in the US
