= United States Mountain =

Mountain in Colorado, United States

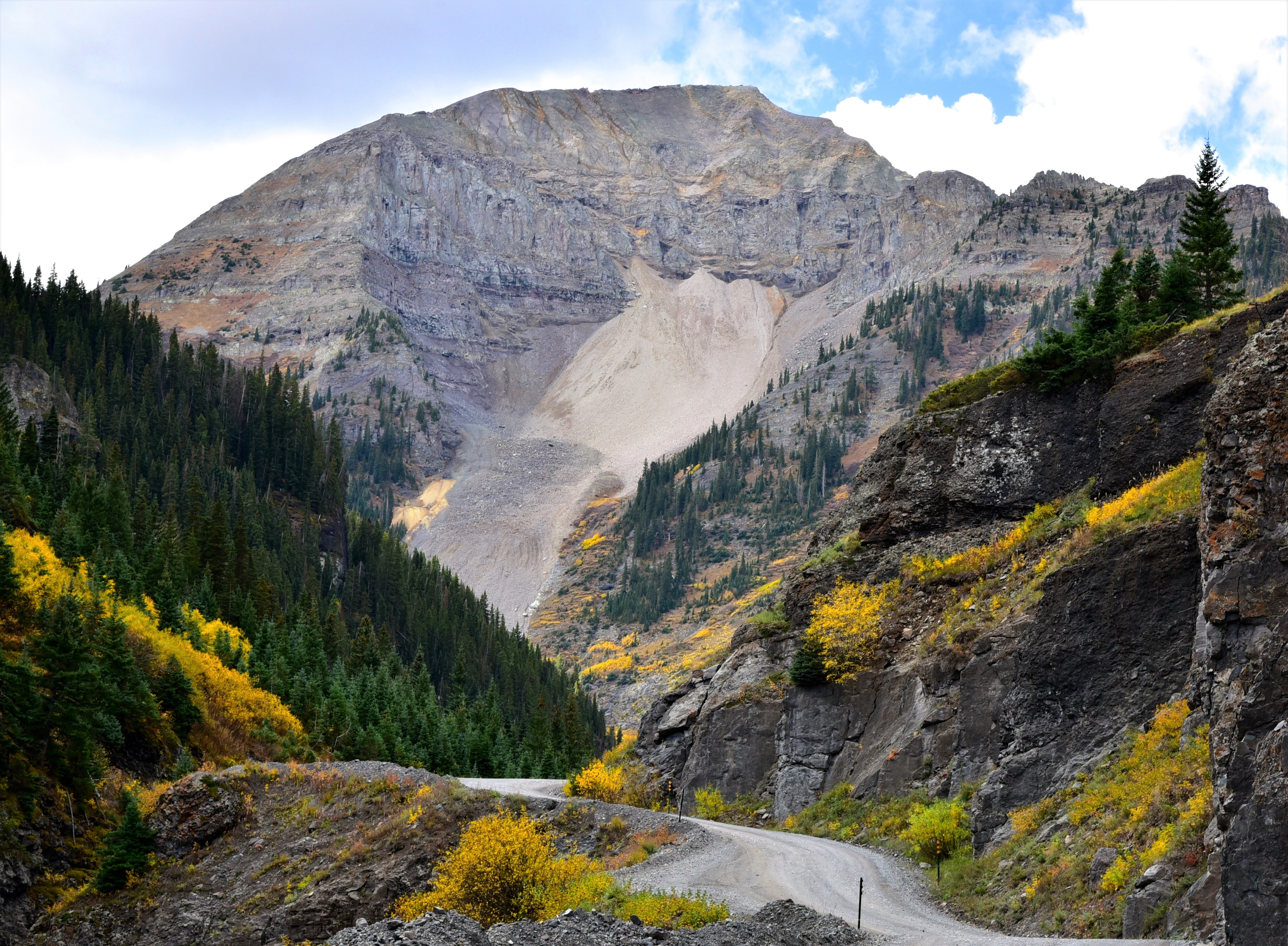
- Northeast aspect, from Camp Bird Road

Highest point
- Elevation: 13,036 ft (3,973 m)
- Prominence: 156 ft (48 m)
- Parent peak: Chicago Peak (13,385 ft)
- Isolation: 0.95 mi (1.53 km)
- Coordinates: 37°57′24″N 107°44′20″W

Geography
- Location within Colorado Location within the United States
- Location: Ouray County; Colorado, US
- Parent range: Rocky Mountains; San Juan Mountains; Sneffels Range
- Topo map: USGS Ironton

United States Mountain is a 13,036-foot-elevation (3,973-meter) mountain summit located in Ouray County of southwest Colorado, United States. It is situated six miles southwest of the community of Ouray, on land managed by Uncompahgre National Forest. It is part of the Sneffels Range which is a subset of the San Juan Mountains, which in turn is part of the Rocky Mountains. It is set west of the Continental Divide, 2.3 miles south of Potosi Peak, and 2.5 miles southeast of Stony Mountain. Recreation enthusiasts heading for Yankee Boy Basin traverse below the northern base of the mountain. Topographic relief is significant as the north aspect rises 3,300 feet (1,000 meters) above the Camp Bird Mine in approximately one mile. Mining activity in the immediate area produced significant amounts of gold and silver. The Hidden Treasure Mine is a gold mine located on the south slope at 11,759-feet elevation.

== Climate ==
According to the Köppen climate classification system, United States Mountain is located in an alpine subarctic climate zone with long, cold, snowy winters, and cool to warm summers. Due to its altitude, it receives precipitation all year, as snow in winter, and as thunderstorms in summer, with a dry period in late spring. Precipitation runoff from the mountain drains into Canyon Creek which is a tributary of the Uncompahgre River.

== Gallery ==
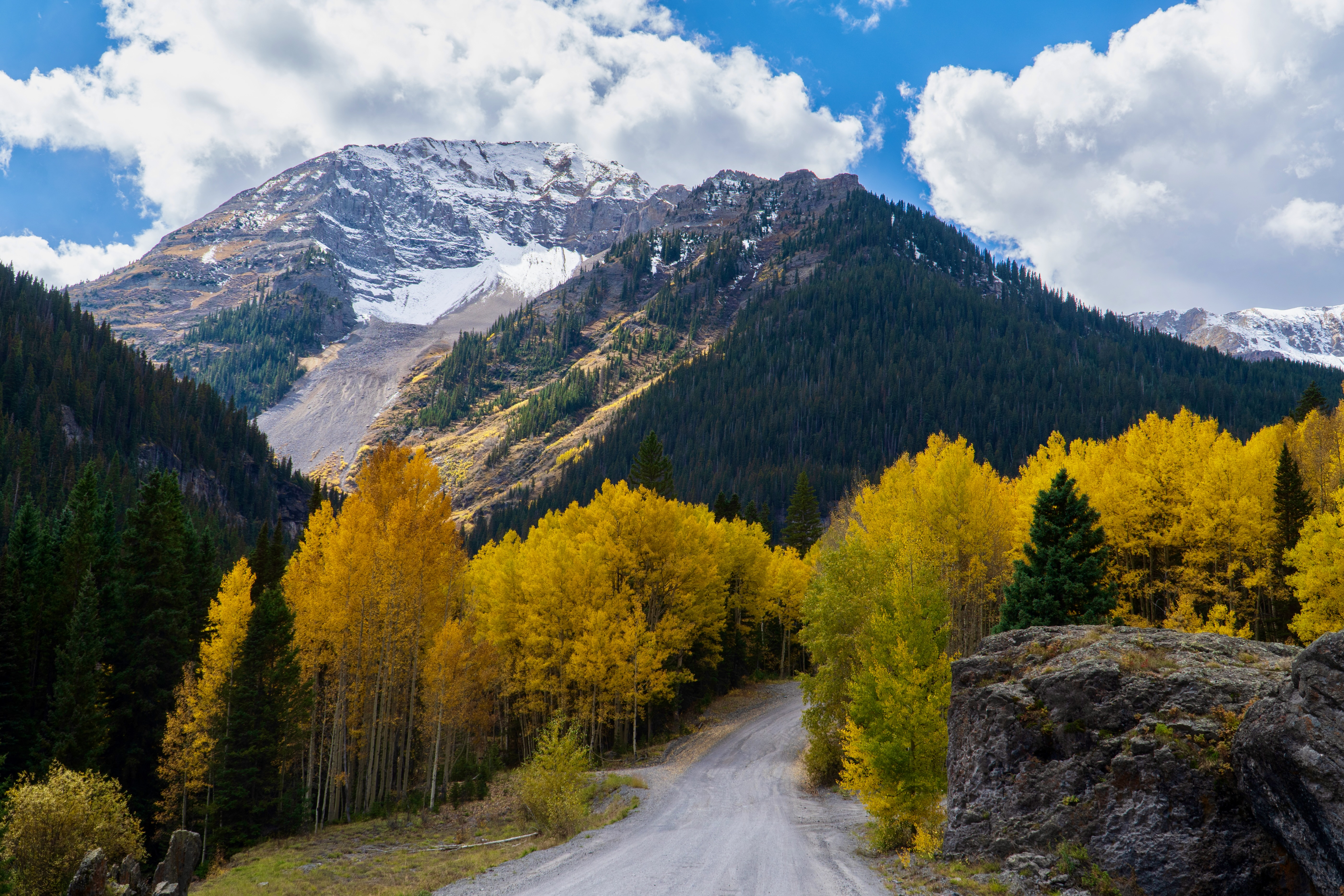
Northeast aspect

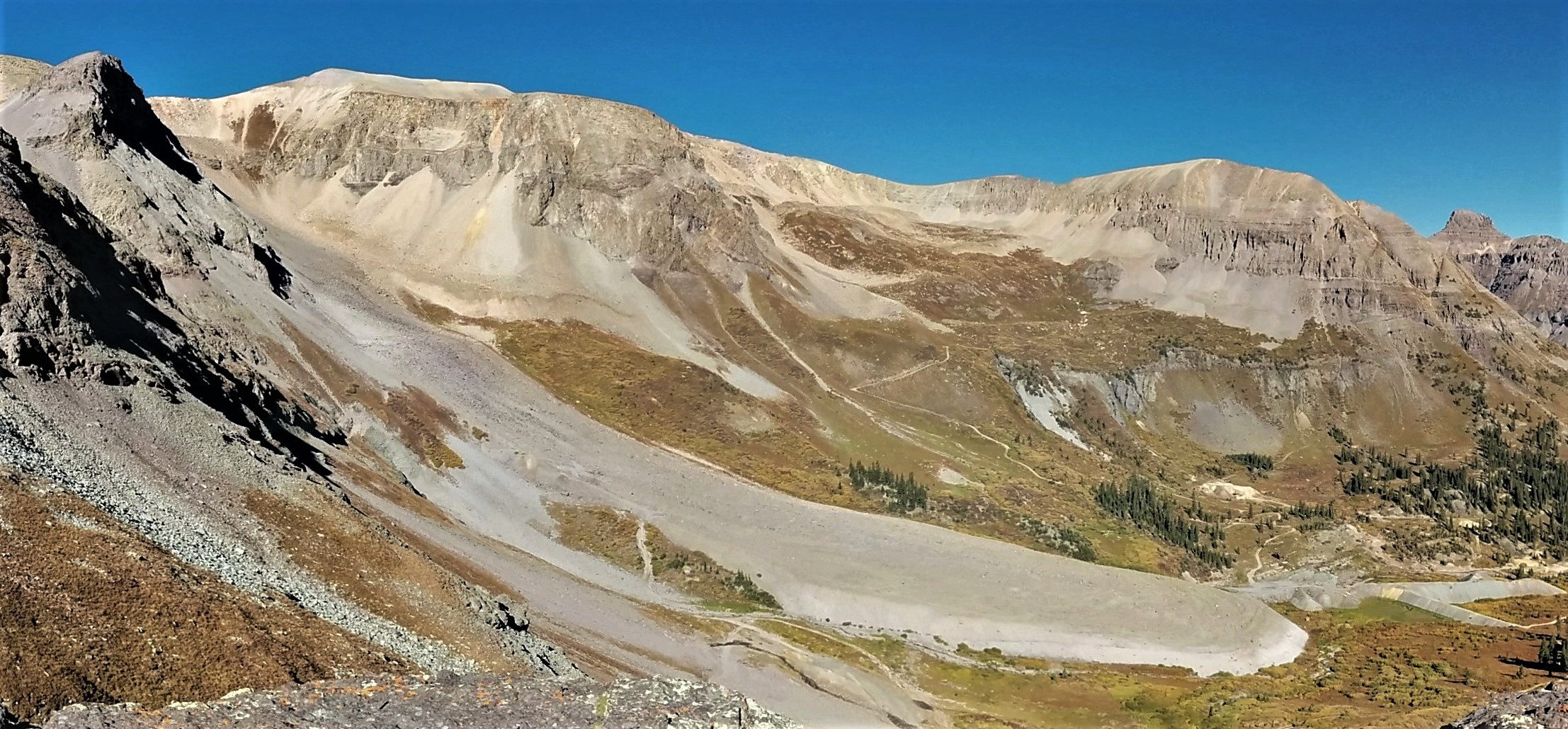
Chicago Peak (left) and United States Mountain (right) viewed from the east.

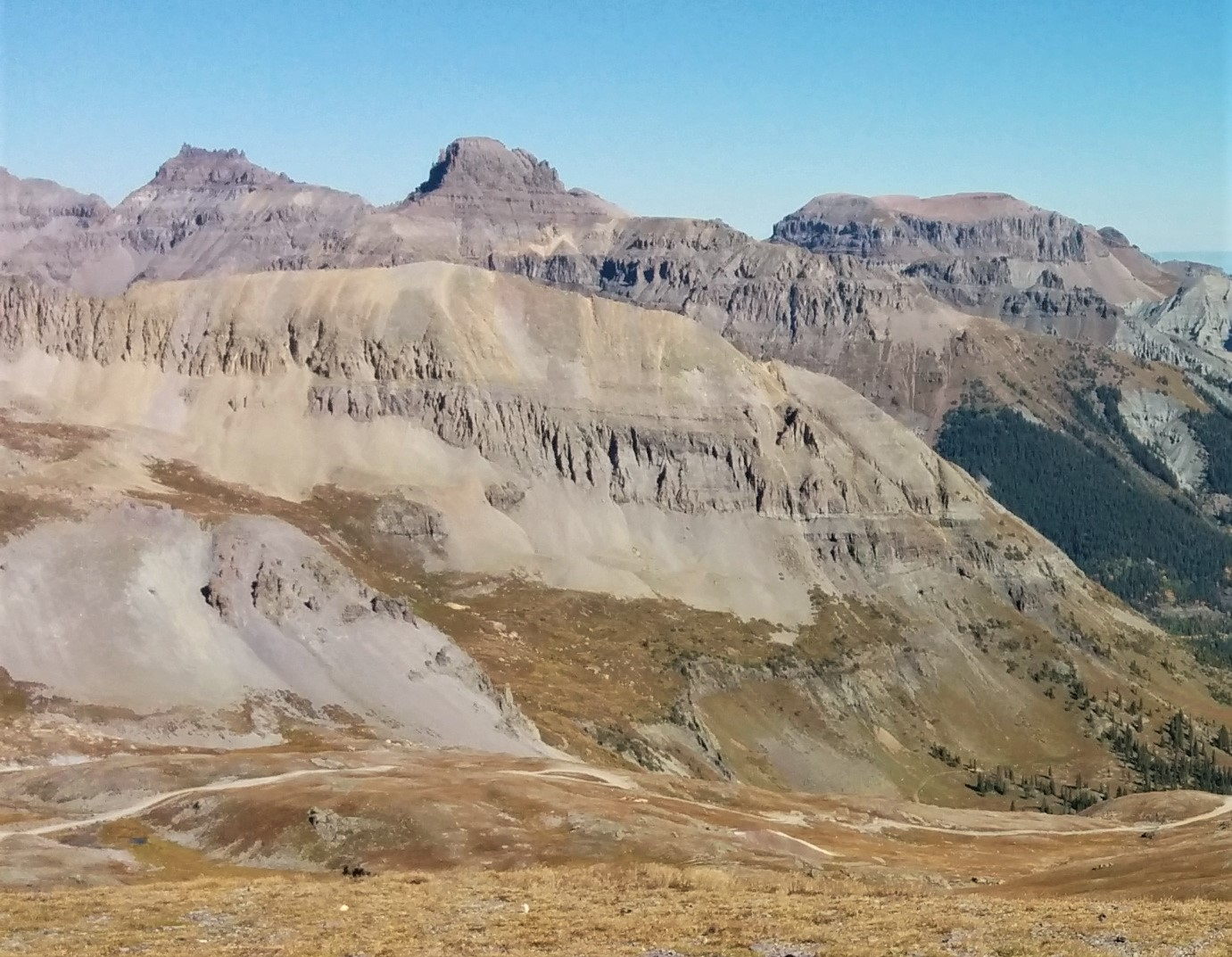
South aspect of United States Mountain seen from Imogene Pass.
In back: Teakettle Mountain, Potosi Peak, and Whitehouse Mountain.

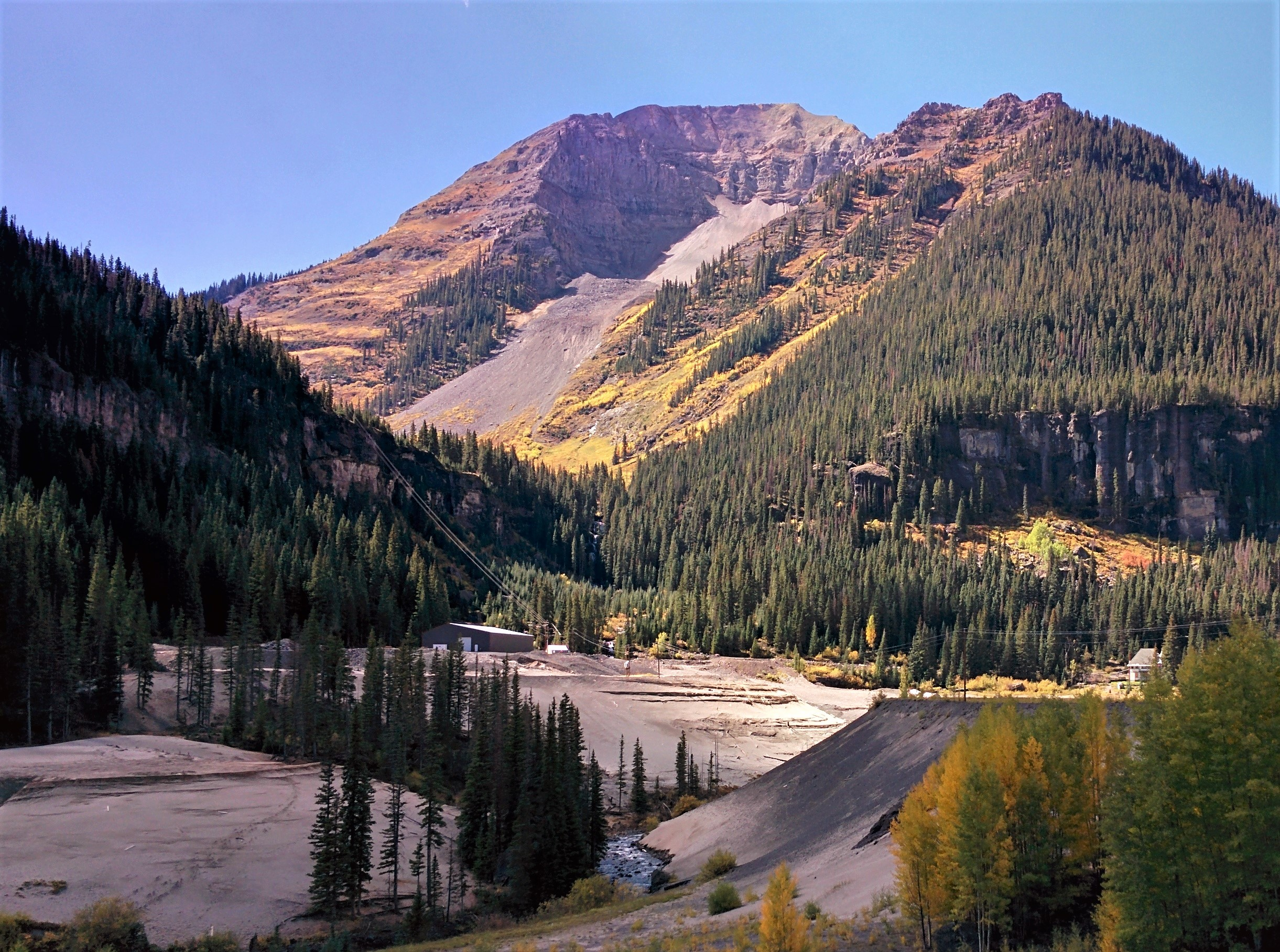
United States Mountain from Camp Bird

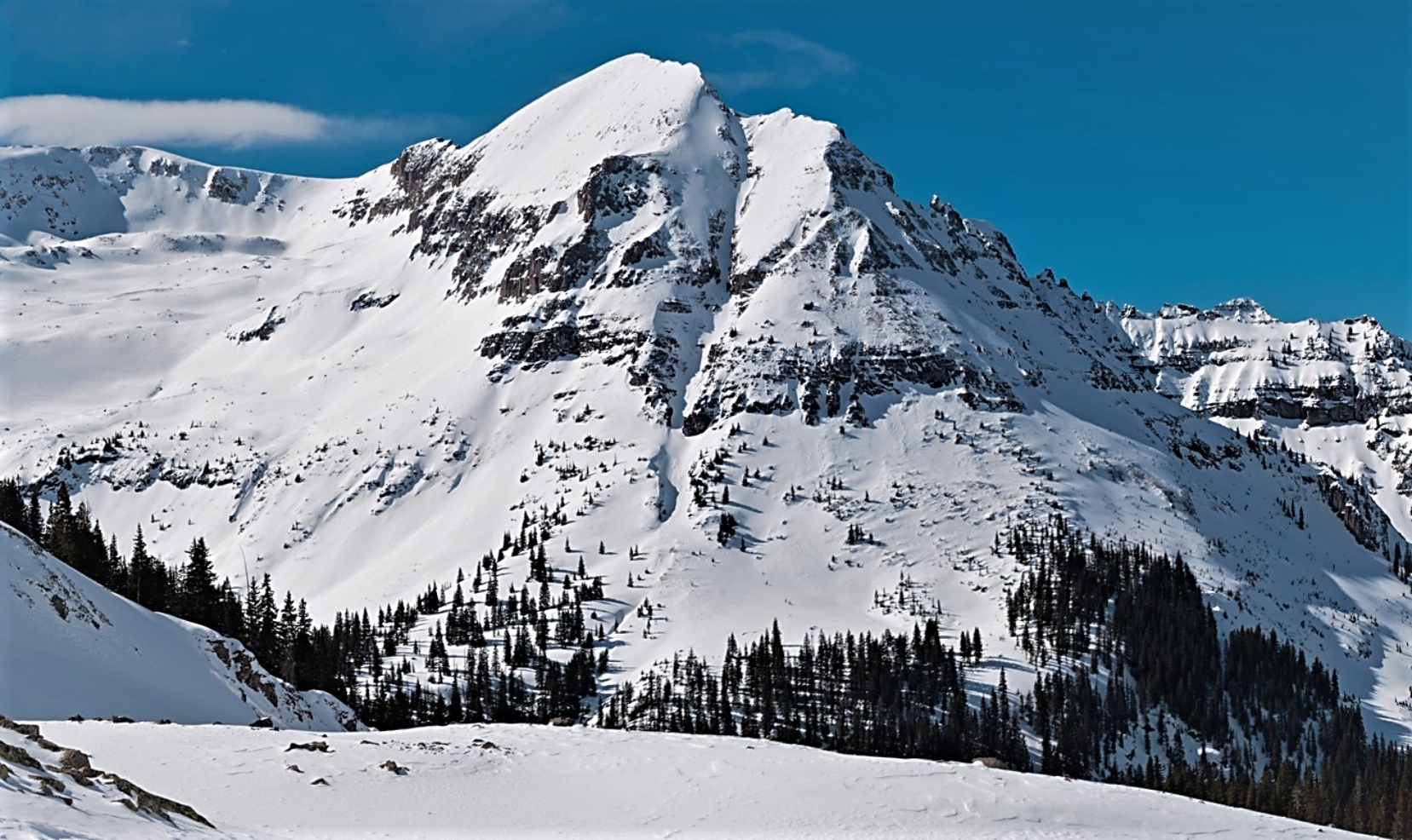

== See also ==
- Mountains of Ouray County, Colorado
