= San Miguel River (Colorado) =

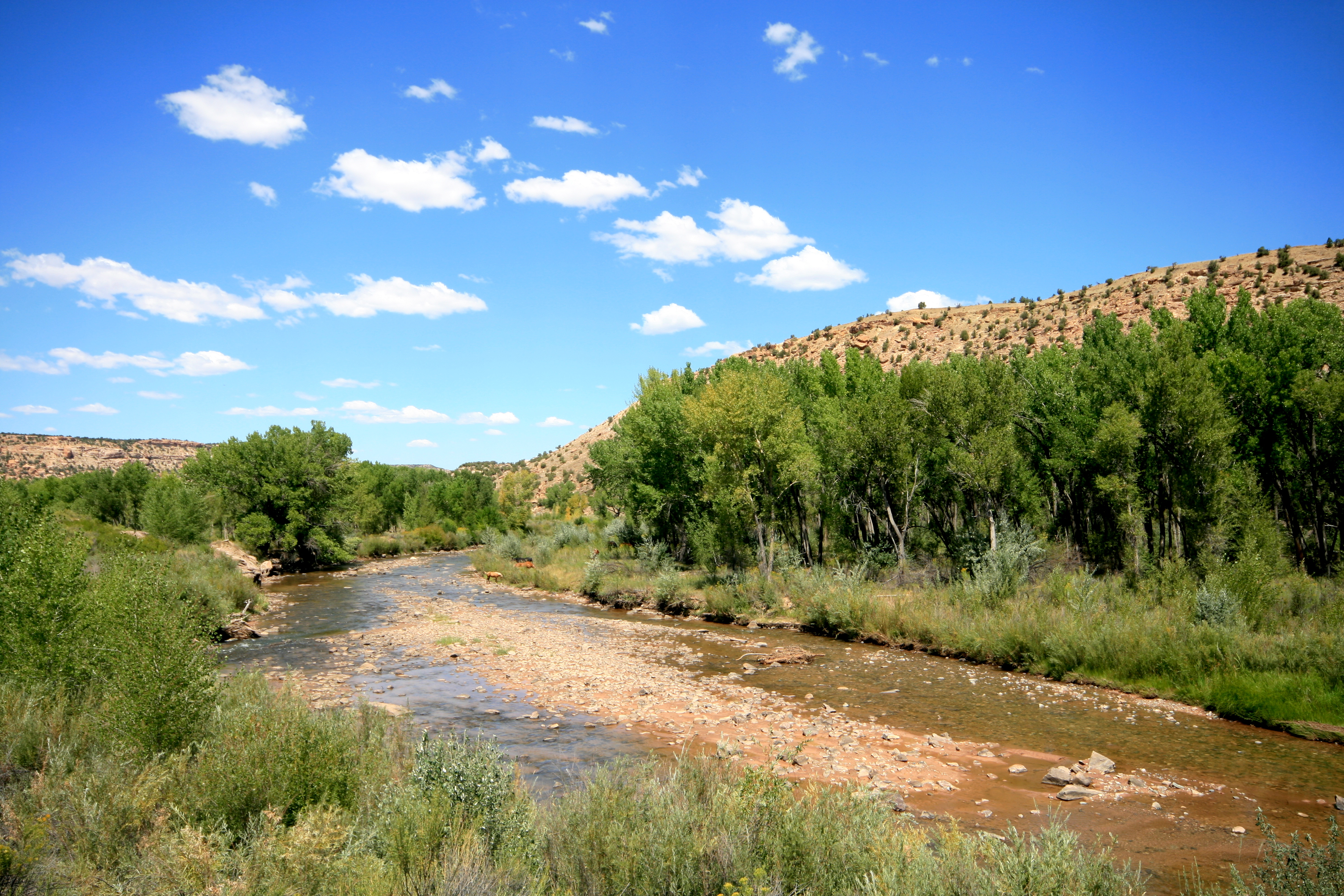
- San Miguel River near Nucla, Colorado

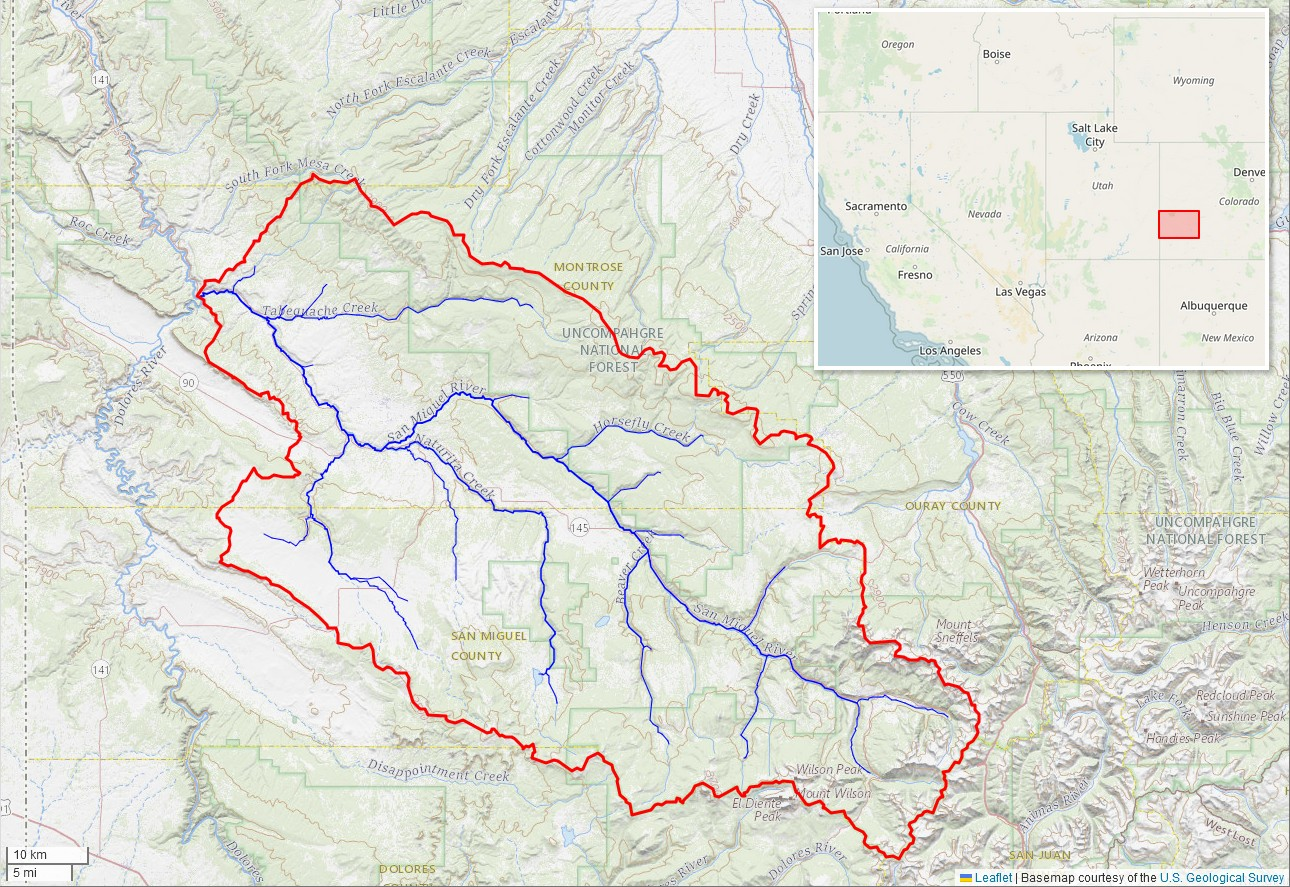
- San Miguel River watershed (Interactive map)

Physical characteristics
- Source
  - coordinates: 37°55′37″N 107°46′33″W
- Mouth
  - location: Confluence with Dolores River
  - coordinates: 38°22′48″N 108°48′12″W
  - elevation: 4,819 ft (1,469 m)

Basin features
- Progression: Dolores—Colorado
- River system: ss

The San Miguel River is a tributary of the Dolores River, approximately 81 miles (130 km) long, in southwestern Colorado in the United States. It rises in the San Juan Mountains southeast of Telluride and flows northwest, along the southern slope of the Uncompahgre Plateau, past the towns of Placerville and Nucla and joins the Dolores in western Montrose County approximately 15 miles (24 km) east of the state line with Utah.

== Geography and protected areas ==
The San Miguel is more or less free-flowing; however, diversion dams dot the river and alter flows. In some parts it is however one of the few remaining naturally functioning rivers of the West.

The San Miguel varies in gradient, from extremely steep in its upper reaches (forming a shallow, rocky, unnavigable stream) to more mellow in the lower sections (30–50 feet per mile (5.7–9.5 m/km) of drop, which offers the whitewater boater a variety of runs all within the class II+--III range). All told, the San Miguel drops over 7,000 feet (2,100 m) from an alpine ecosystem to the desert. The average flow is about 600 cu ft/s (17 m^{3}/s).

More than 30 miles of the San Miguel are a protected area, as parts of the area were purchased by the ″Nature Conservancy Association″ in 1989.

The preserved zone hosts a riparian habitat, featuring the typical vegetation such as grey alders and narrowleaf cottonwood. The native fish include rather rare species such as cutthroat trout and the mottled sculpin. The River also features a 2,000 feet high, narrow canyon with walls of red-rock sandstone. American dippers have built their nests.

Bridal Veil Creek of Bridal Veil Falls and other creeks above Telluride join to form the river, which first flows to the west through Telluride. Other tributaries include the South Fork of the San Miguel River, which joins from the south and itself has various creeks and the Lake Fork of the San Miguel River as tributaries.

== Tourism ==
Whitewater kayakers and boaters enjoy many sections on the San Miguel. Minimum suggested flows for small vessels is 250 cfs, with the river near Placerville usually becoming navigable in late April or early May. Several runs of varying length are commonly undertaken from there to the confluence with the Dolores, near the site of Uravan. The San Miguel is considered a continuous class 2 run with several class three rapids which become more challenging at higher flows, where the river's speed can make it difficult to stop and scout. Additional River hazards are three diversion dams that exist between Naturita and the Hwy 145 bridge East of Norwood. All of them are relatively easy to scout and portage, however. As the river meanders through an agricultural valley just east of Naturita, several cattle fences cross the river.

Other popular outdoor activities at San Miguel River include walking, hiking and fly fishing, for which the conditions are best from July to September.

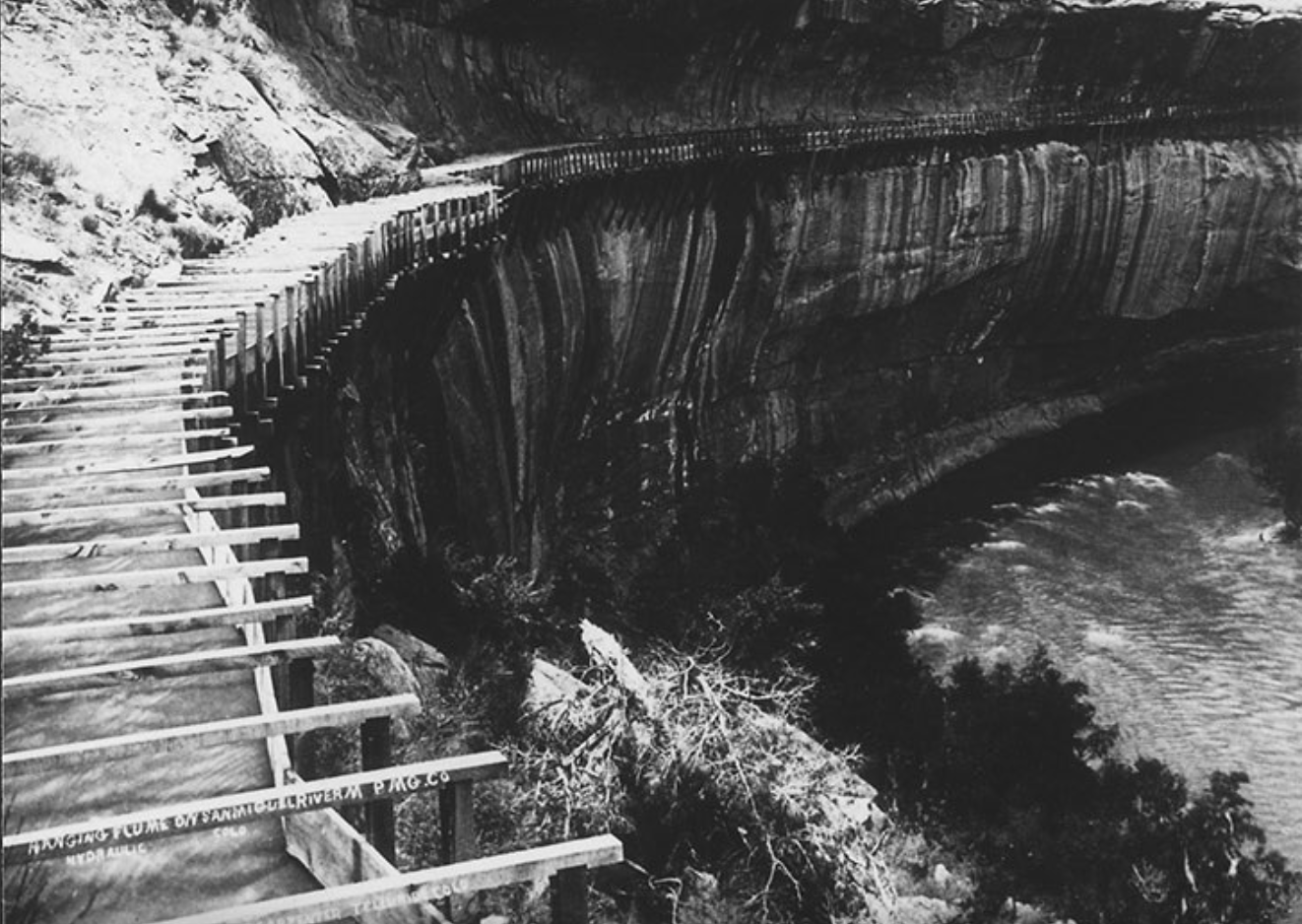
Hanging flume on the lower San Miguel River in 1891. Remnants of the flume may still be seen today.

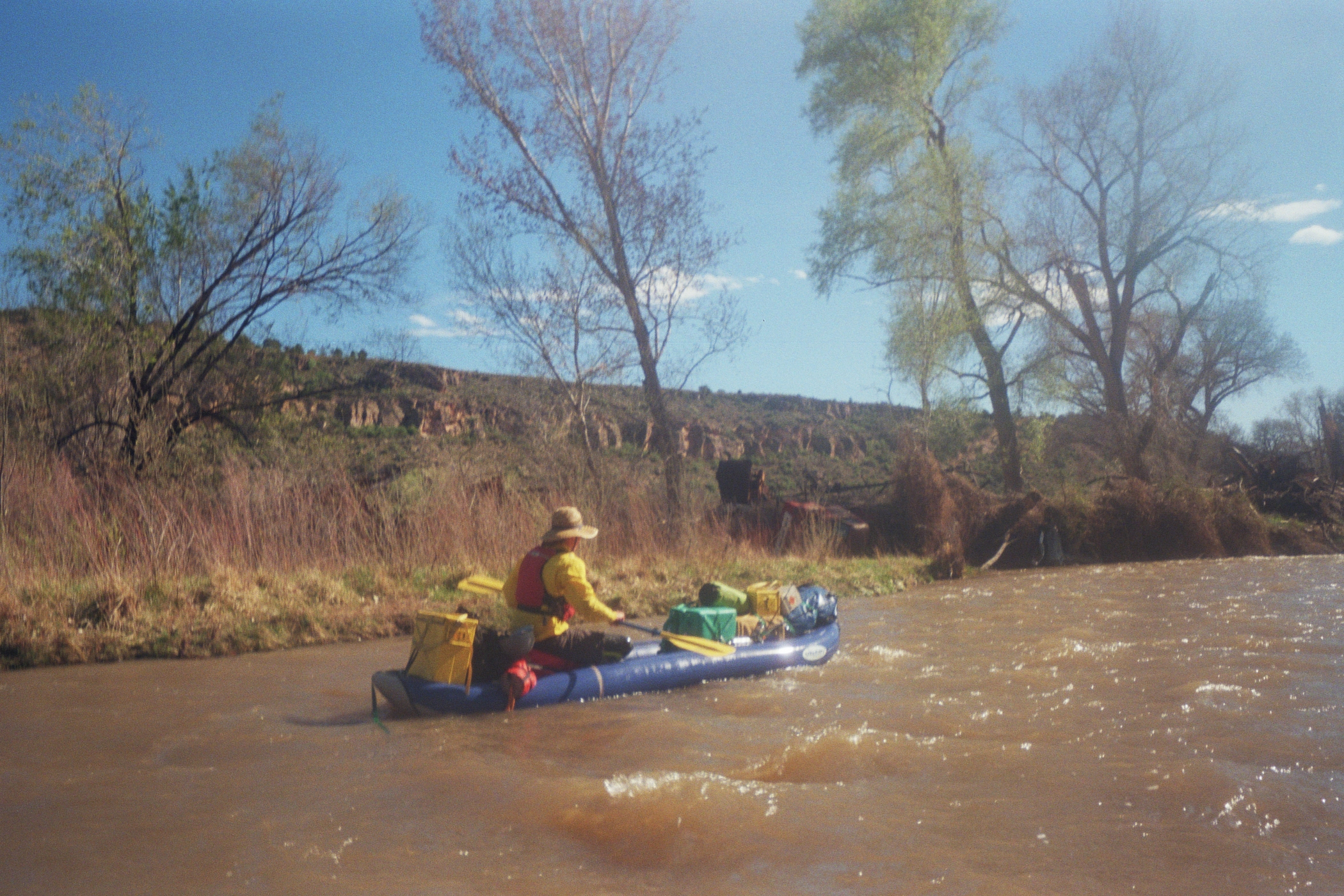
Paddler in an inflatable boat on the San Miguel River

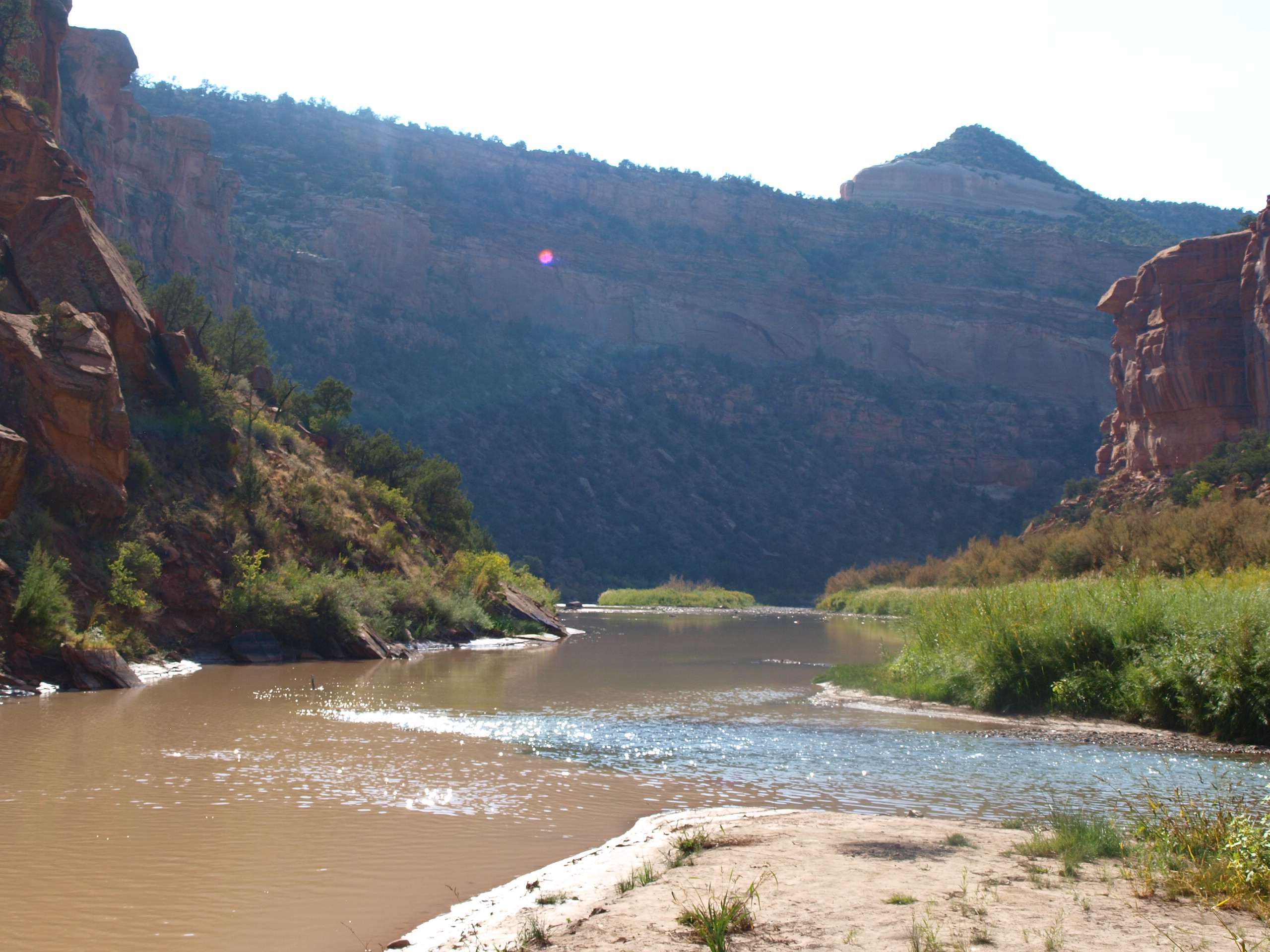
The mouth of the San Miguel - the confluence of the Dolores River (muddy on the left) and the San Miguel (clear on the right)

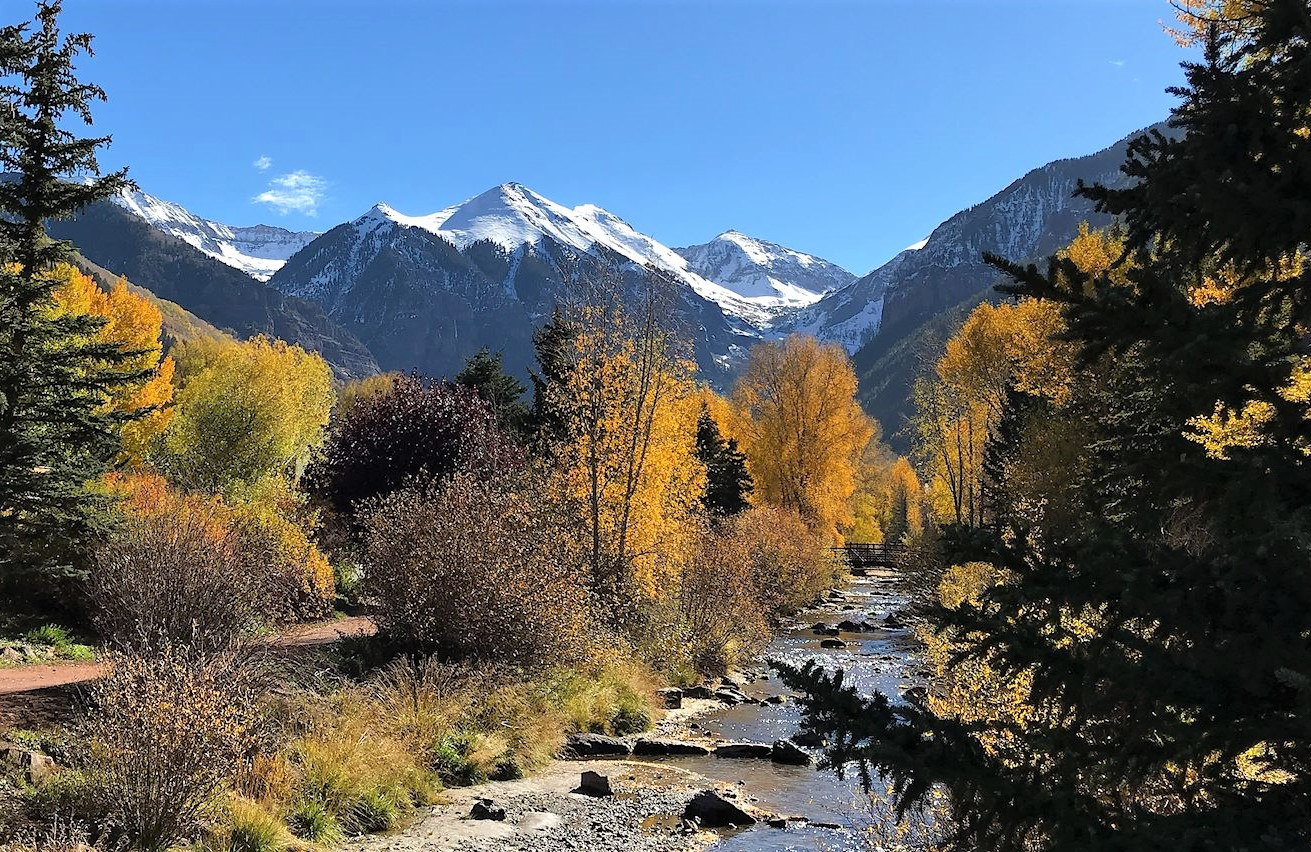
The headwaters of San Miguel River form at Ajax Peak, shown with the river.

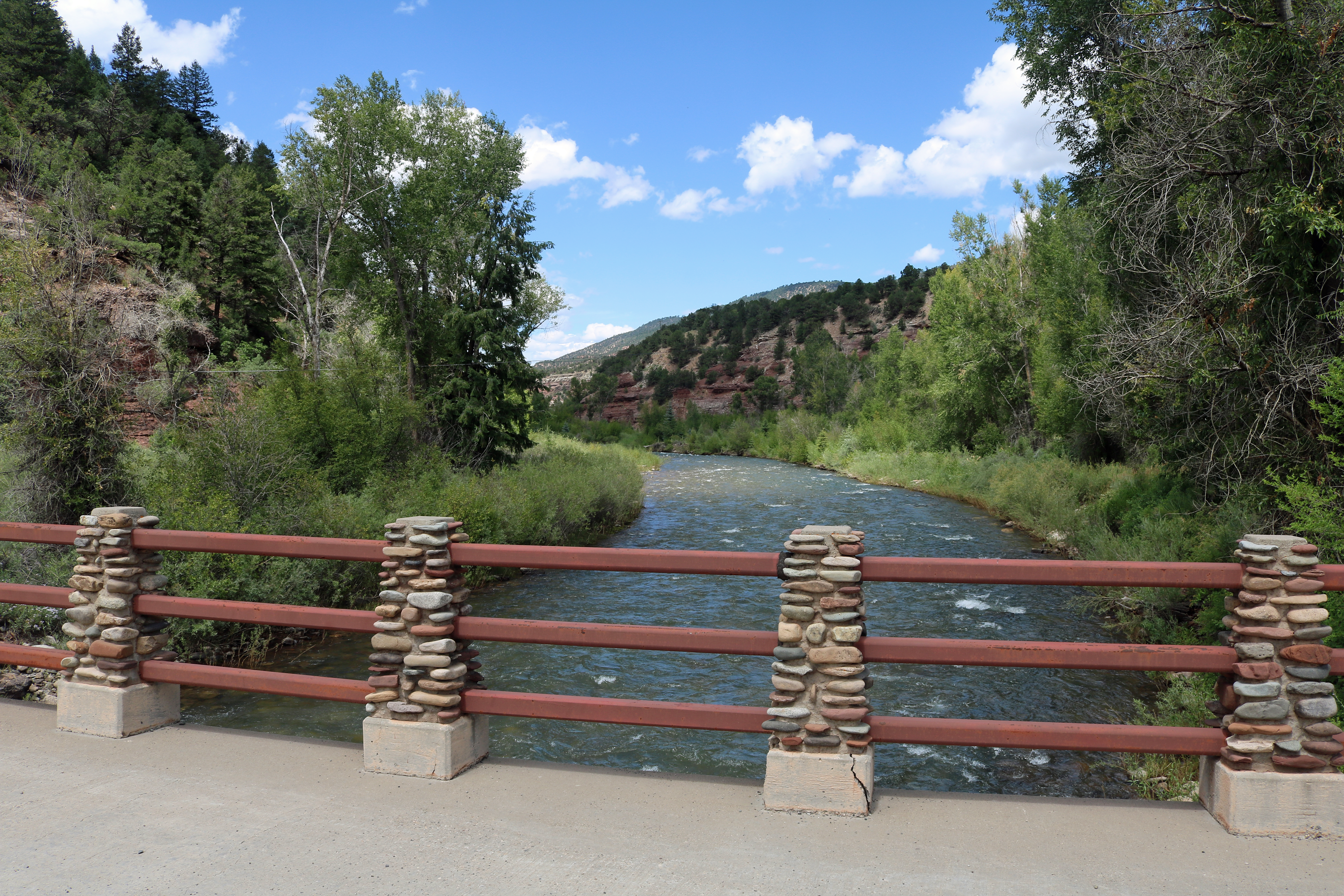
The river at Placerville, Colorado

== See also ==
- List of rivers of Colorado
- List of tributaries of the Colorado River
