= Bridal Veil Falls (Telluride) =

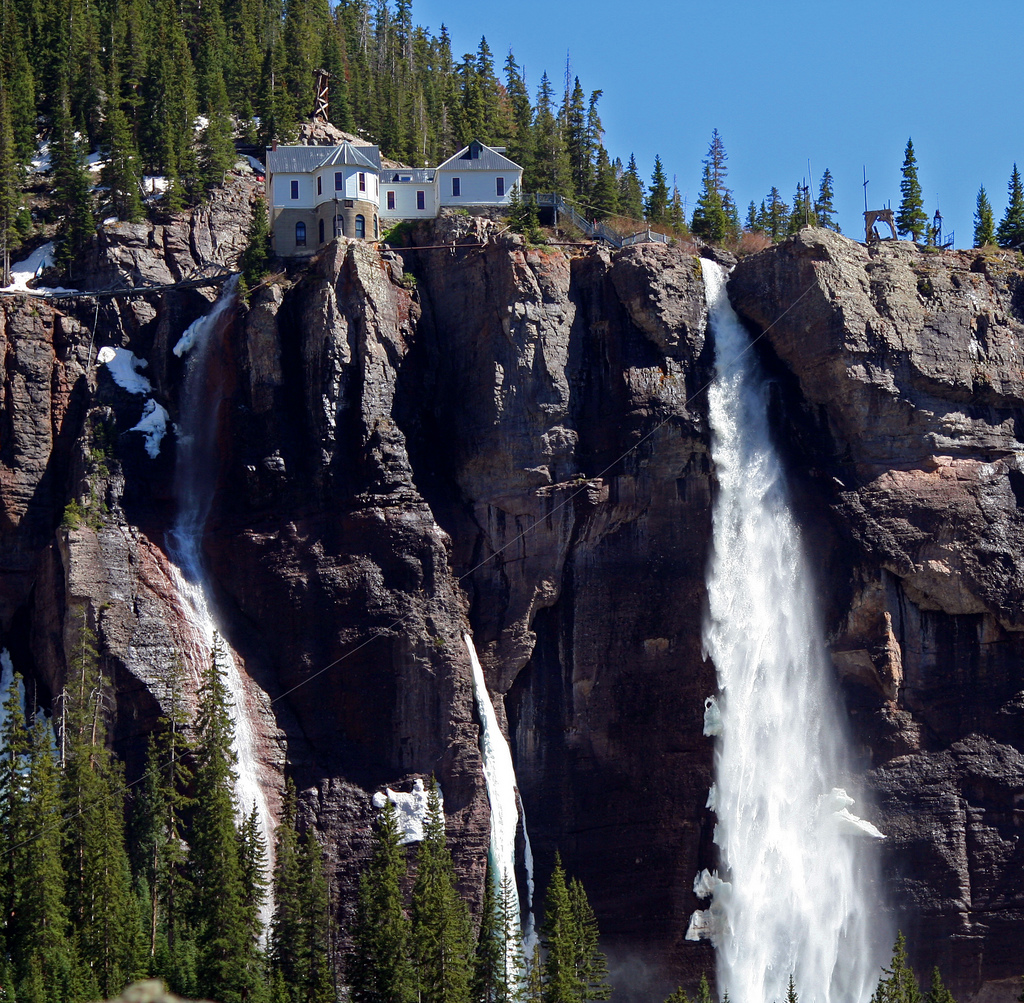

- Location within Colorado
- Location: Telluride, Colorado
- Coordinates: 37°55′09″N 107°46′12″W
- Elevation: 10,279 ft (3,133 m)
- Total height: 365 ft (111 m)
- Watercourse: San Miguel River

Bridal Veil Falls is a 365-foot (111 m) waterfall at the end of the box canyon overlooking Telluride, Colorado. Hiking and off-road trails pass by the falls and it has a hydroelectric power plant at its top. In winter the frozen shape of the falls forms an imposing challenge to intrepid ice climbers.

== Description ==
Bridal Veil Falls are a two-pronged waterfall. The area around Bridal Veil Falls is subject to avalanche and controlled shelling to create controlled slides is an event popular with spectators and photographers. Reaching the top of the falls in winter can be a precarious venture, even for the experienced family that lives there.

A hiking trail continues on past the falls to mountain meadows and mountain lakes above 10,000 feet (3,000 m).

Bridal Veil Creek arises near Lewis Lake, flows north and over the falls, then joins other creeks to form the San Miguel River (Colorado) which flows west through Telluride.

== History ==
=== Ice climbing ===
In 1978, Jeff Lowe and Mike Wiess became the first ice climbers to summit the falls, their effort having been broadcast on ABC's Wide World of Sports.

The falls were opened briefly in the 1990s to ice climbers, but the area is private property so climbing has been legally prohibited since. Referred to as a "mega classic" and "the most difficult waterfall ice climb in North America", some climbers have trespassed to take a crack at the imposing and dangerous climb, but a land purchase proposal and an insurance deal may change the situation. Climbers were excited by the proposal in 2008 that would reopen the falls to climbers.

=== Electric power generation ===
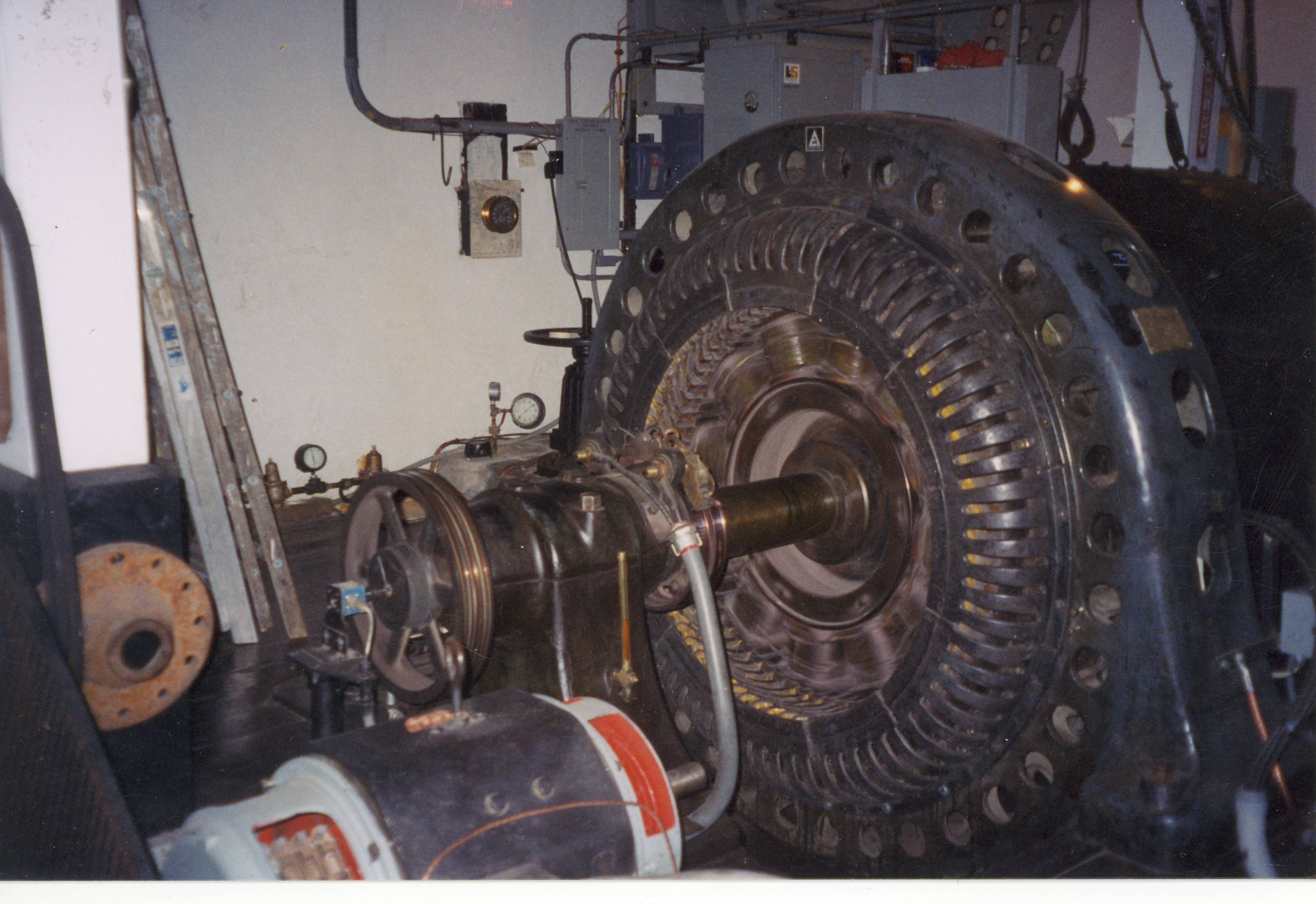
The AC electric generator at Bridal Veil Falls is one of the oldest still operating in the US

A hydro-electric alternating current power plant, the Smuggler-Union Hydroelectric Power Plant built in 1907, sits on top of the falls, originally used to power the Smuggler-Union Mine. It was eventually owned by the Idarado Mining Company, who decommissioned it in 1953. It was leased from Idarado by local resident Eric Jacobson in 1988, who restored the power house to operation in 1991 and lived in the residence with his family until 2010 when he gave up the lease. The Idarado Mining Company now owns and operates the power plant and sells the power. The power generated provides about 25 percent of Telluride's demand for electricity and the plant still contains its original 2300 volt Westinghouse Electric AC generator, one of the oldest AC generators still in operation. In 1979, it was listed on the National Register of Historic Places.

== See also ==
- List of waterfalls
- Waterfalls of Colorado
