= Tomboy, Colorado =

- Ghost town
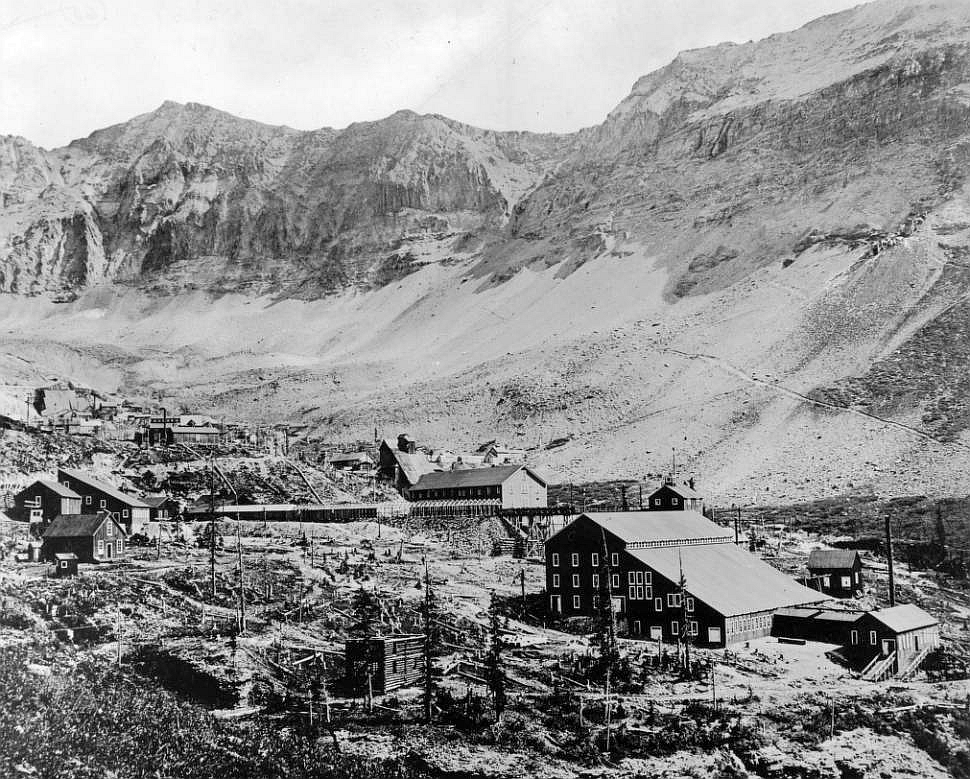
- Tomboy, circa 1890-1910

- Location within Colorado
- Coordinates: 37°56′12″N 107°45′16″W
- Country: United States
- State: Colorado
- County: San Miguel
- Elevation: 11,509 ft (3,508 m)
- Time zone: UTC-7 (MST)
  - Summer (DST): UTC-6 (MDT)
- GNIS feature ID: 187139

Tomboy is a ghost town in San Miguel County, Colorado, United States.

Tomboy was a mining town located 2 mi (3.2 km) east of Telluride.

At an elevation of 11,509 ft (3,508 m), Tomboy is one of the highest ghost towns in the United States.

== History ==
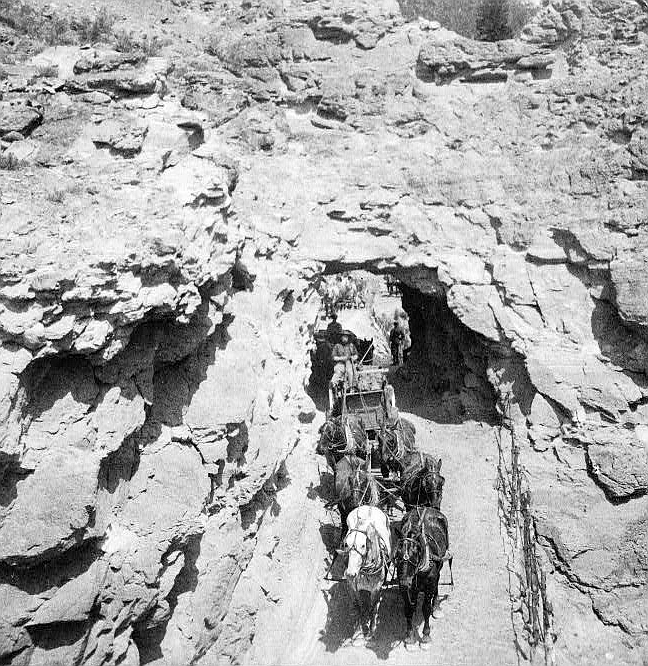
Gold ore from the Tomboy Mine, circa 1910

Located in a mountainous region known as the Savage Basin, the settlement was originally named "Savage Basin Camp". The Tomboy Mine was located nearby and began producing gold ore in 1894. Eventually the settlement became known as Tomboy.

A stagecoach carrying passengers and mail would pass daily through Tomboy. Tomboy had a store, school, stable, and cabins for the miners. Unusual for an 1800s mining town, Tomboy had a YMCA and tennis courts.

The mine was sold for $2 million to the Rothschilds of London in 1897.

Between 1908 and 1914, zinc was milled in Tomboy.

The mine operated until 1928, though work in the mine tunnel continued until 1978.

Remnants of Tomboy can be accessed by hikers or by four-wheel drive vehicles, though the settlement is now located on privately owned land.
