= Hayden Peak (San Miguel County, Colorado) =

Mountain in the state of Colorado

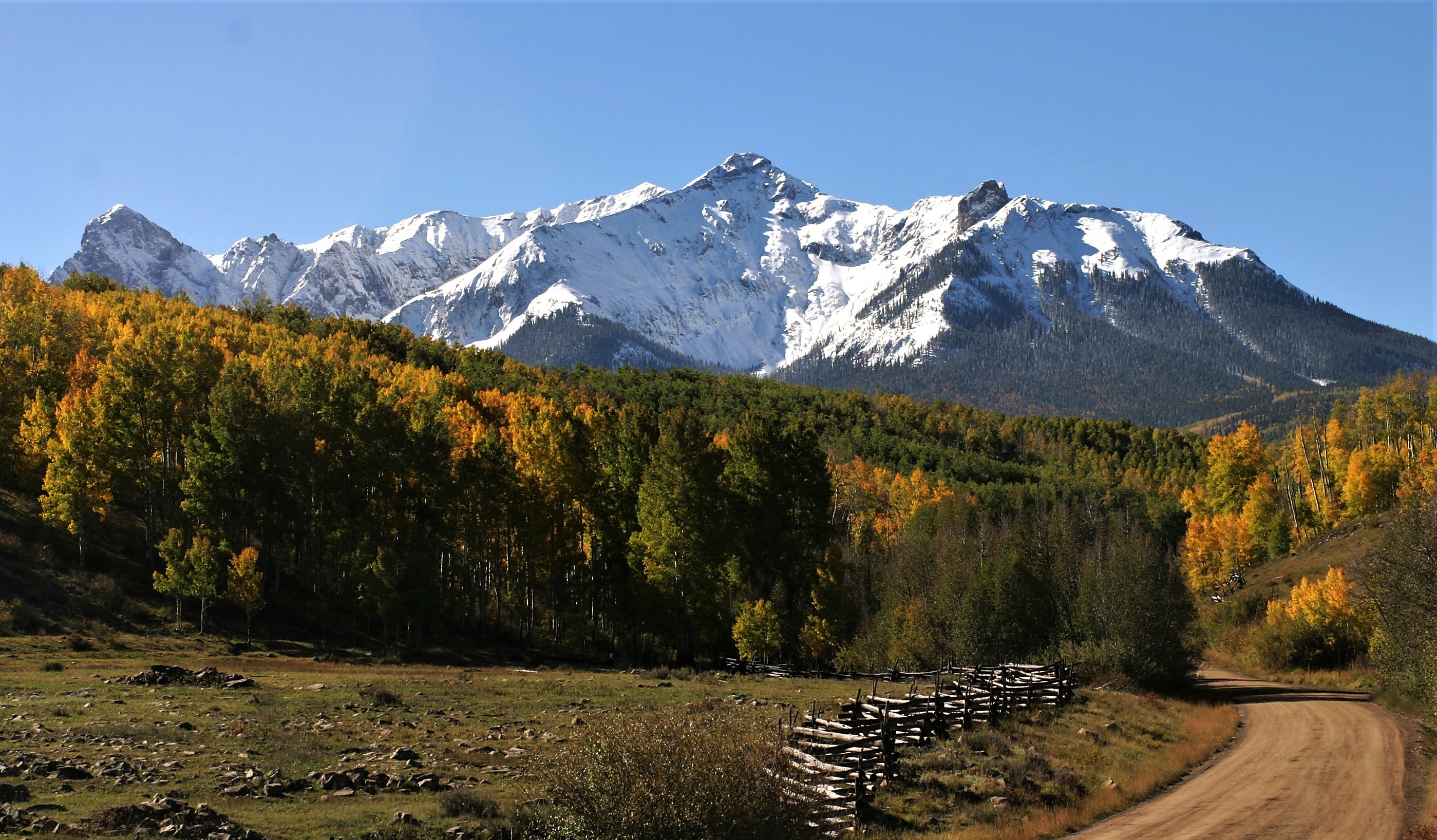
- North aspect

Highest point
- Elevation: 12,987 ft (3,958 m)
- Prominence: 207 ft (63 m)
- Parent peak: Peak 13,020
- Isolation: 0.29 mi (0.47 km)
- Coordinates: 38°01′50″N 107°54′33″W

Naming
- Etymology: Ferdinand Vandeveer Hayden

Geography
- Location within Colorado Location within the United States
- Location: San Miguel County; Colorado, US
- Parent range: Rocky Mountains; San Juan Mountains; Sneffels Range
- Topo map: USGS Sams

Geology
- Rock type: Extrusive rock

Climbing
- Easiest route: class 2

Hayden Peak is a 12,987-foot-elevation (3,958-meter) mountain summit located in San Miguel County, in Colorado, United States. It is situated nine miles northwest of the community of Telluride, in the Mount Sneffels Wilderness, on land managed by Uncompahgre National Forest. It is part of the Sneffels Range which is a subset of the San Juan Mountains, which in turn is part of the Rocky Mountains. Hayden Peak is situated west of the Continental Divide, and three miles northwest of Mears Peak. Topographic relief is significant as the south aspect rises 2,000 feet (610 meters) above Deep Creek in approximately one mile.

== Etymology ==
This mountain's name was officially adopted by the U.S. Board on Geographic Names to commemorate Ferdinand Vandeveer Hayden (1829–1887), an American geologist noted for his pioneering surveying expeditions of the Rocky Mountains. His survey team studied western Colorado from 1873 through 1876.

== Climate ==
According to the Köppen climate classification system, Hayden Peak is located in an alpine subarctic climate zone with long, cold, snowy winters, and cool to warm summers. Due to its altitude, it receives precipitation all year, as snow in winter, and as thunderstorms in summer, with a dry period in late spring. Precipitation runoff from the mountain drains into tributaries of the San Miguel River.

== Gallery ==
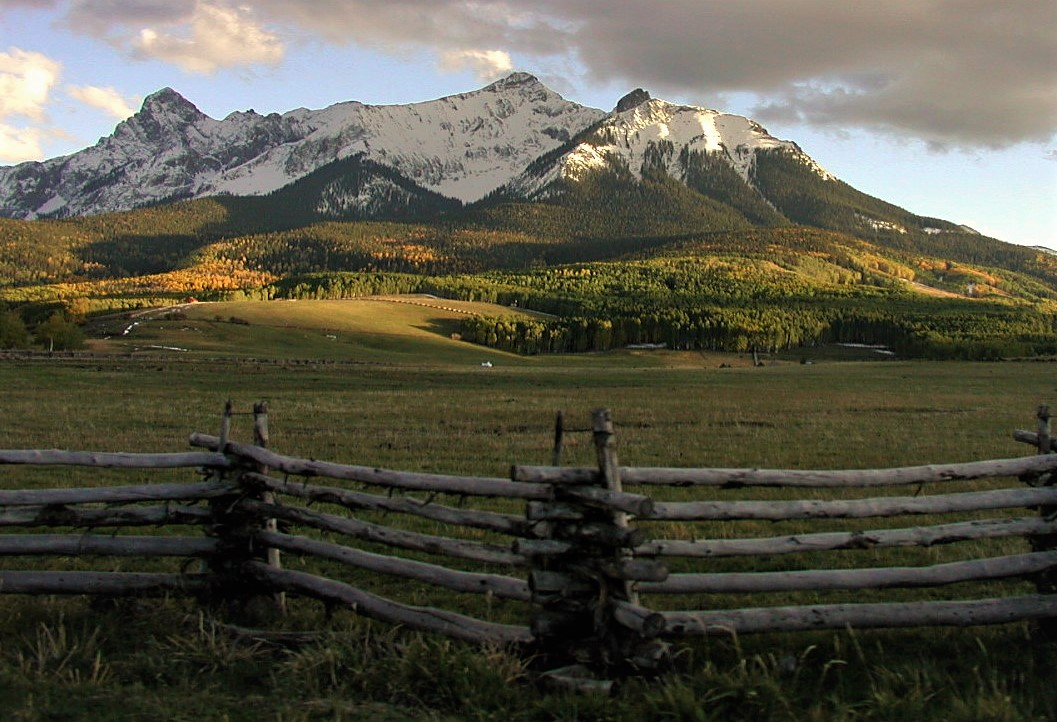
Hayden Peak centered, north aspect

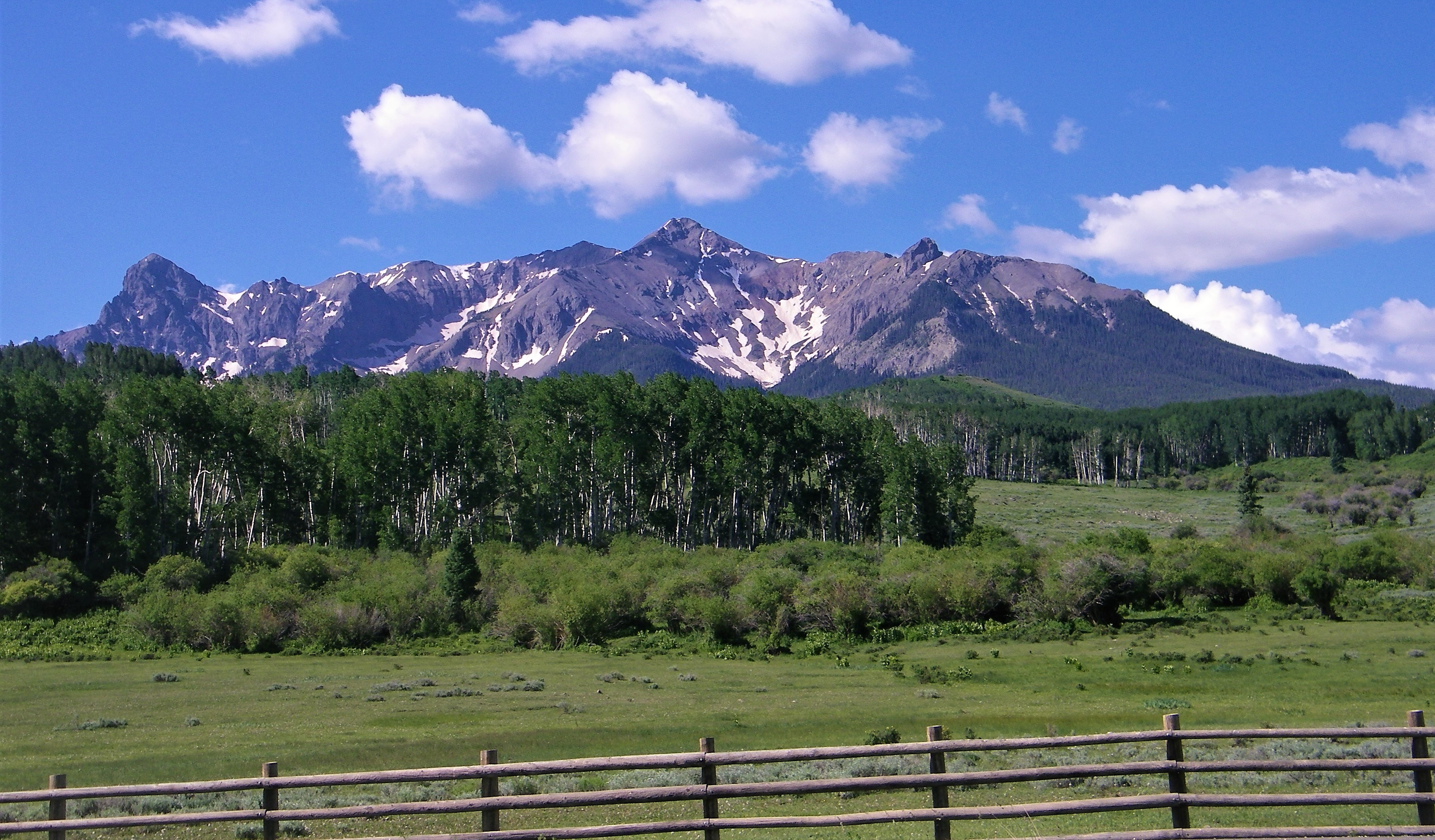
Hayden Peak centered, north aspect

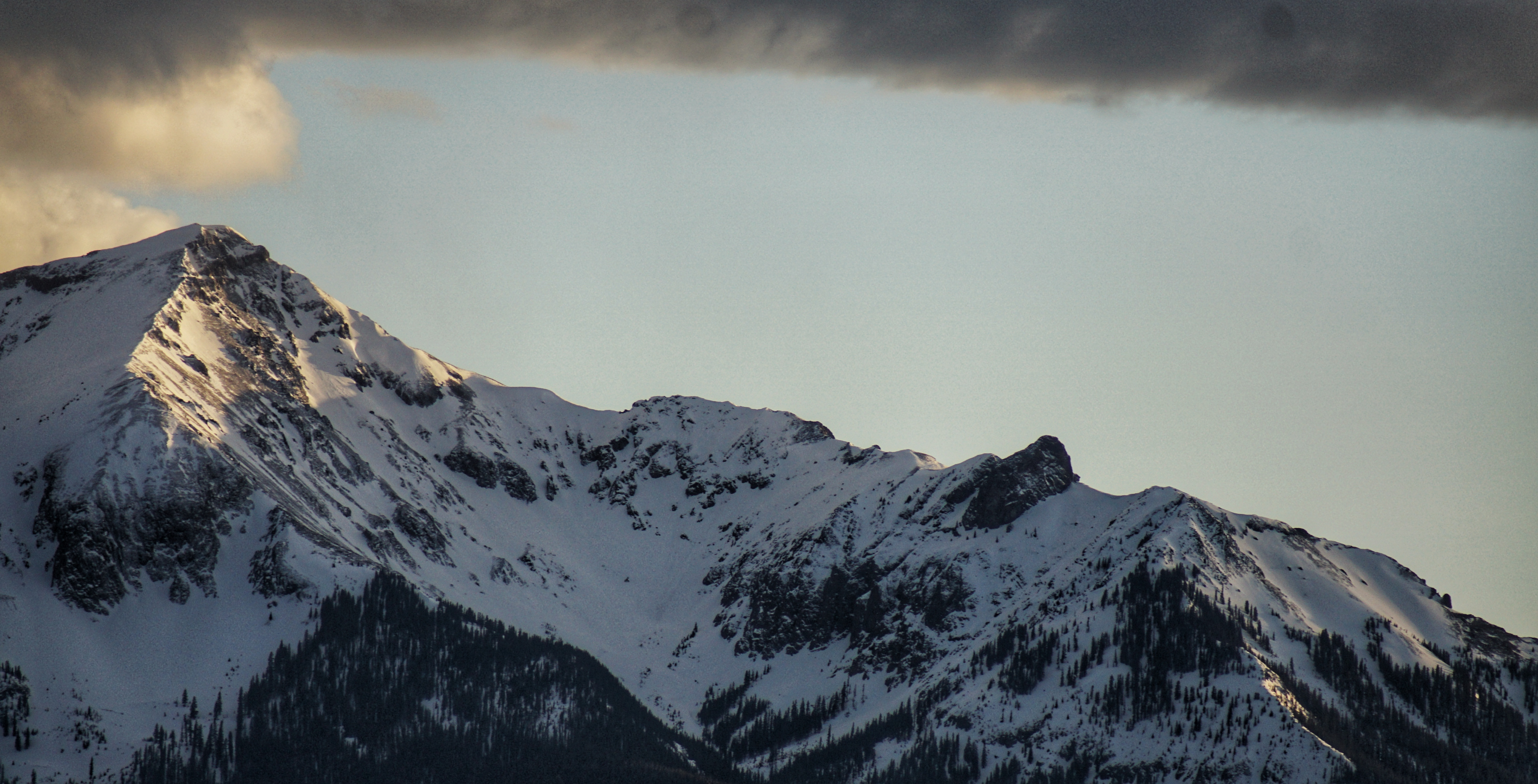
Hayden Peak (left) with little North Pole Peak to right

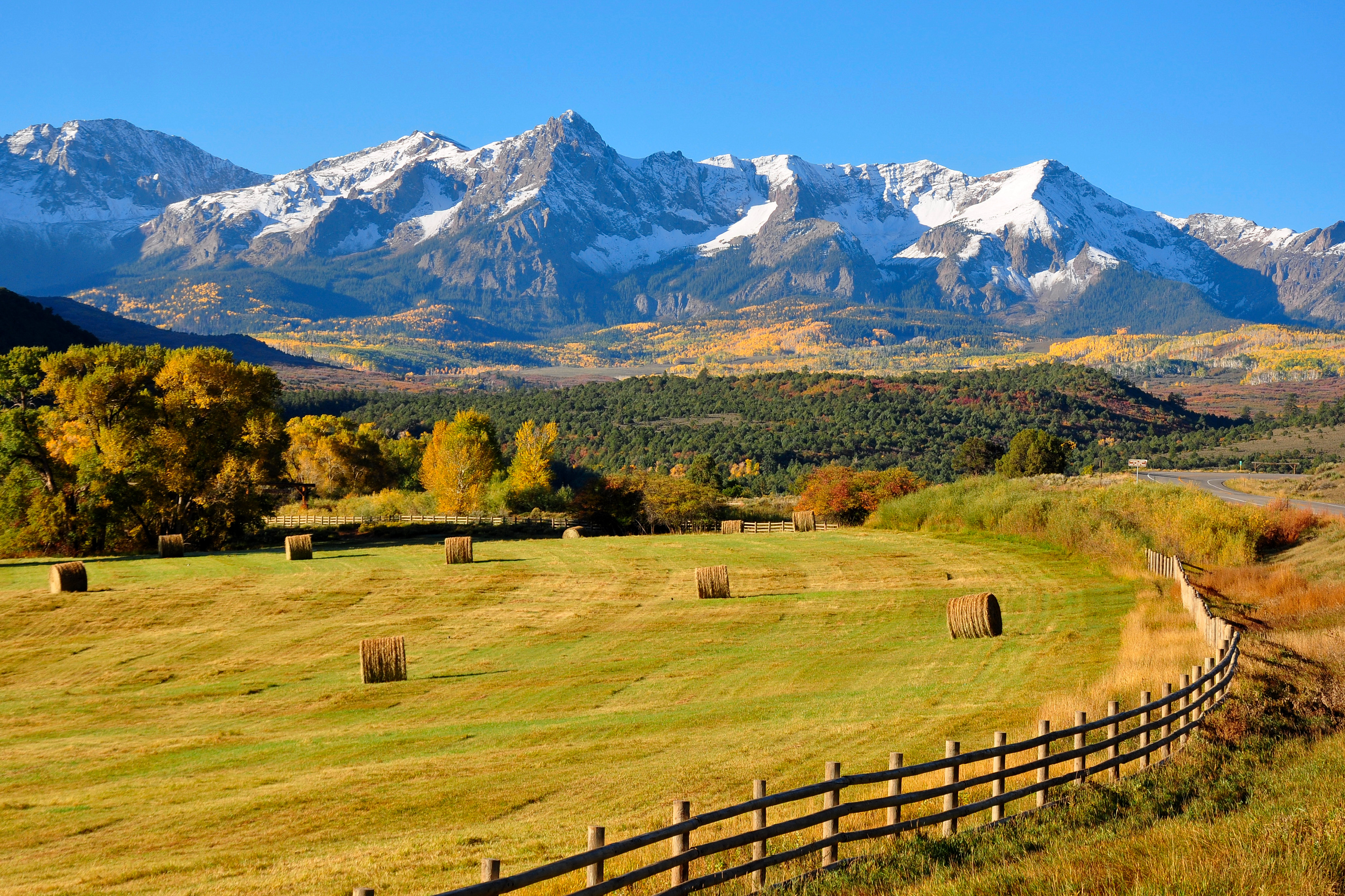
Hayden Peak (right) seen from the northeast along State Highway 62
(Pastoral field of Ralph Lauren's Double RL Ranch in foreground)

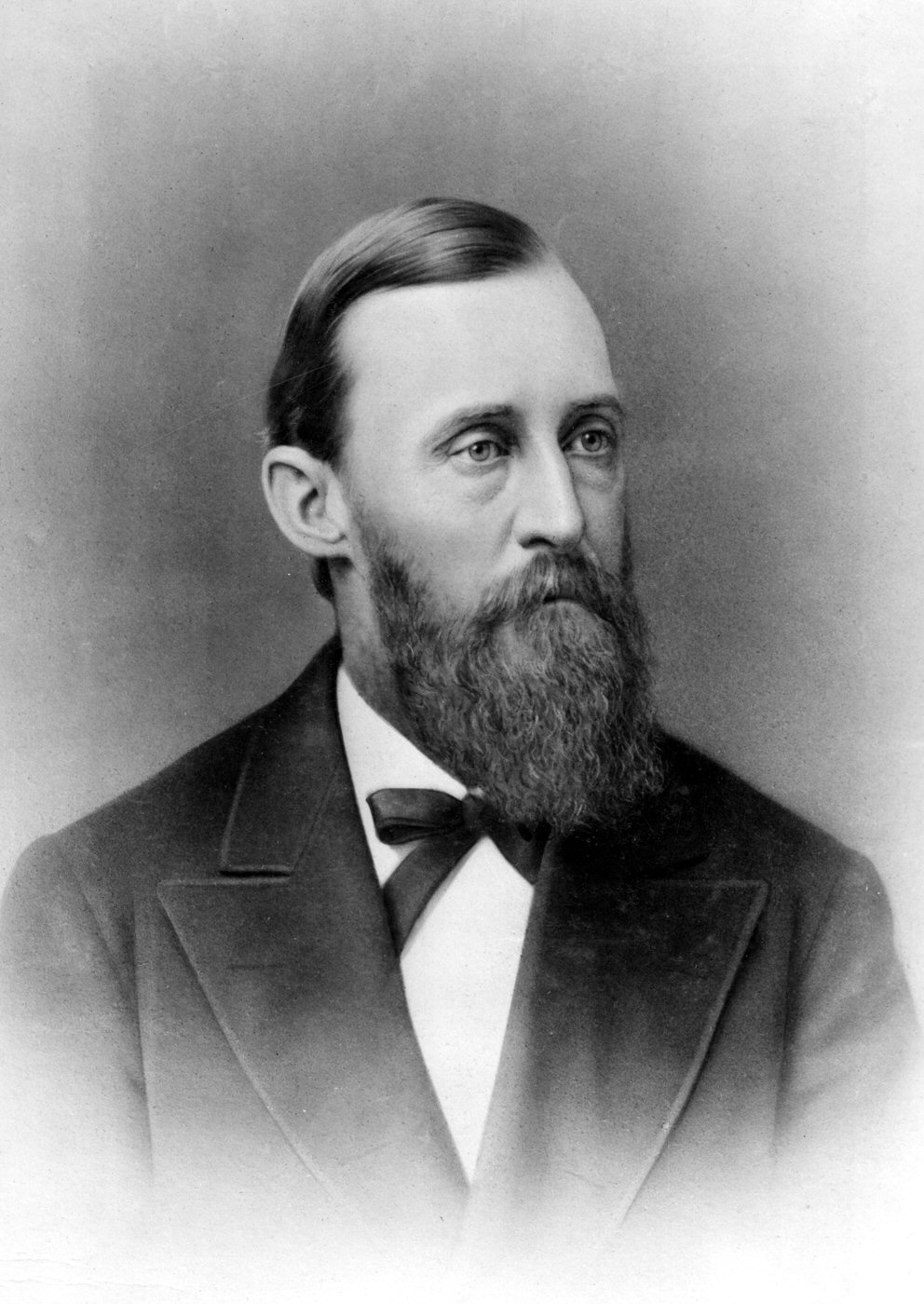
Ferdinand V. Hayden, 1870

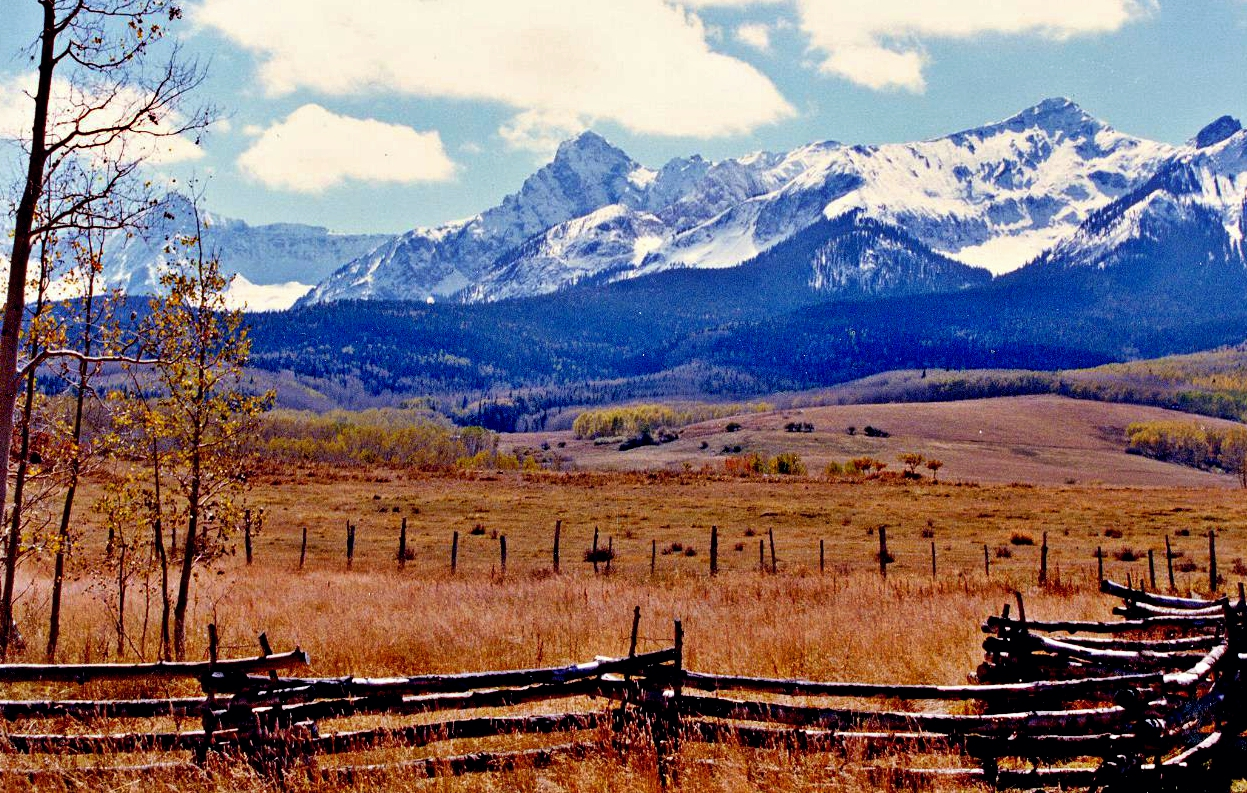
Hayden Peak to the right

== See also ==
- Mountains of San Miguel County, Colorado
- Hayden Peak (Pitkin County, Colorado)
