= Mears Peak =

Mountain in Colorado, United States

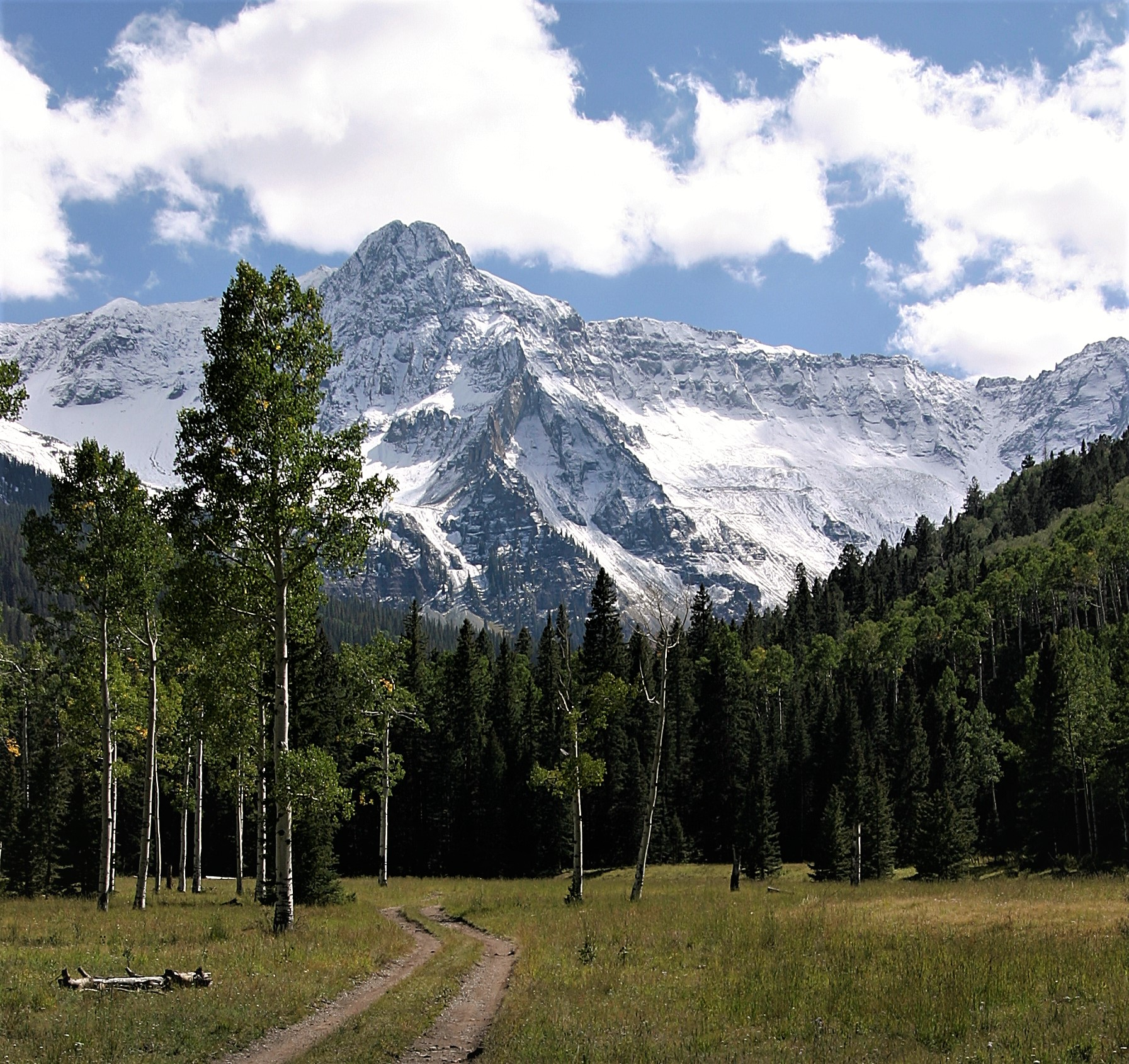
- North aspect from Box Factory Park

Highest point
- Elevation: 13,496 ft (4,114 m)
- Prominence: 536 ft (163 m)
- Parent peak: "T 0" (13,735 ft)
- Isolation: 1.36 mi (2.19 km)
- Coordinates: 38°00′34″N 107°51′43″W

Naming
- Etymology: Otto Mears

Geography
- Location within Colorado Location within the United States
- Location: Ouray County / San Miguel County; Colorado, US
- Parent range: Rocky Mountains; San Juan Mountains; Sneffels Range
- Topo map: USGS Mount Sneffels

Geology
- Rock type(s): Extrusive rock, andesitic breccia

Climbing
- Easiest route: class 2+ scrambling

Mears Peak is a 13,496-foot-elevation (4,114-meter) mountain summit located on the common boundary of Ouray County with San Miguel County, in Colorado, United States. It is situated six miles northwest of the community of Telluride, in the Mount Sneffels Wilderness, on land managed by Uncompahgre National Forest. It is part of the Sneffels Range which is a subset of the San Juan Mountains, which in turn is part of the Rocky Mountains. Mears Peak is situated west of the Continental Divide, and 3.8 miles west of Mount Sneffels. Topographic relief is significant as the south aspect rises 4,900 feet (1,500 meters) above the San Miguel River in approximately 5.5 miles.

== History ==
This mountain's name and location were officially adopted in 1970 by the U.S. Board on Geographic Names to commemorate Otto Mears (1840–1931). Prior to 1970, the USGS placed Mears Peak at a location one mile to the east. Otto Mears was known for his road and railroad building projects through Colorado's San Juan Mountains, which were instrumental in the early development of southwestern Colorado in the late 19th century. Notably, he built the Million Dollar Highway. There is also a Mount Otto in Colorado named after him.

== Climate ==
According to the Köppen climate classification system, Mears Peak is located in an alpine subarctic climate zone with long, cold, snowy winters, and cool to warm summers. Due to its altitude, it receives precipitation all year, as snow in winter, and as thunderstorms in summer, with a dry period in late spring. Precipitation runoff from the mountain drains south to the San Miguel River, and north to the Uncompahgre River via Dallas Creek.

== Gallery ==
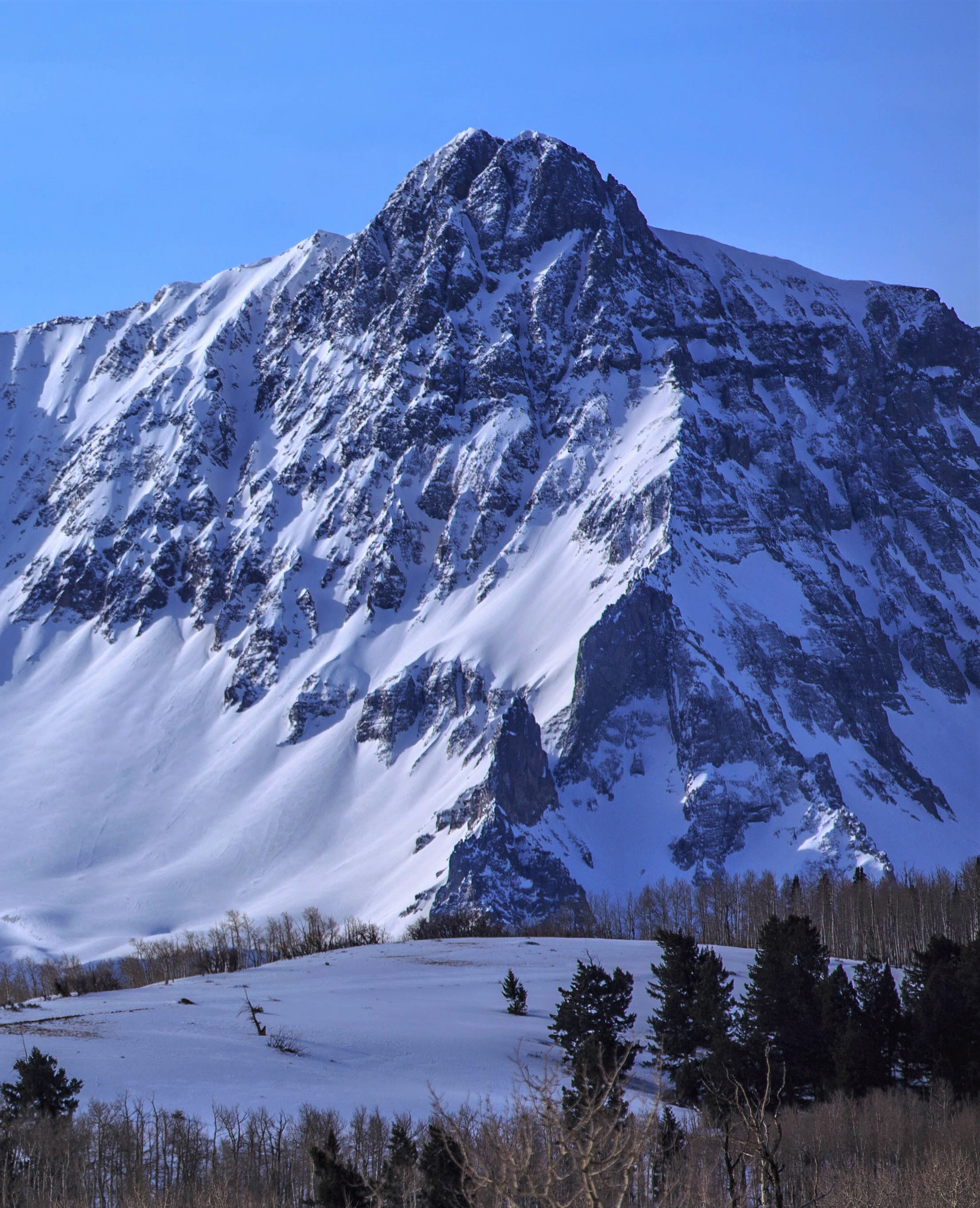
North aspect

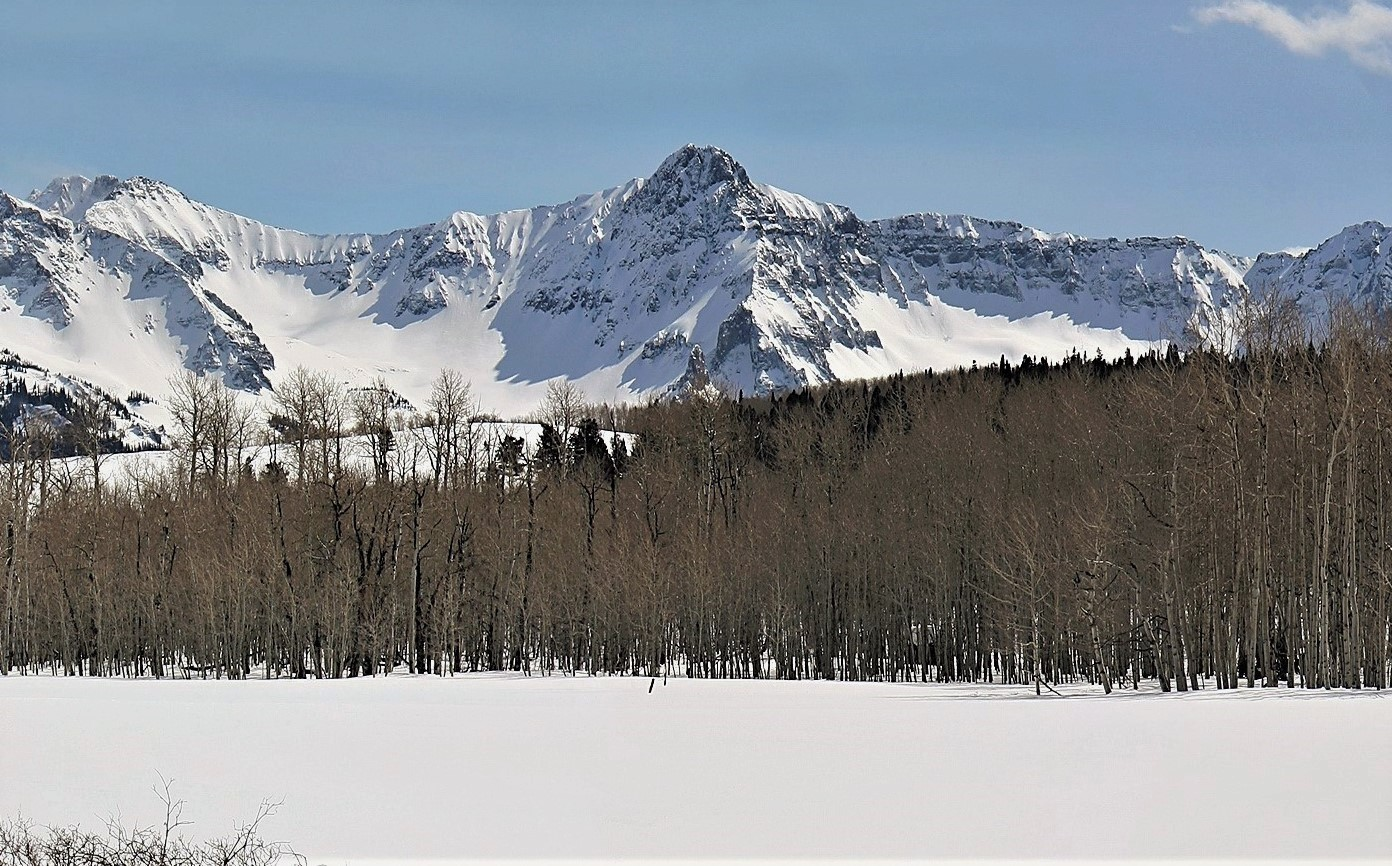
North aspect

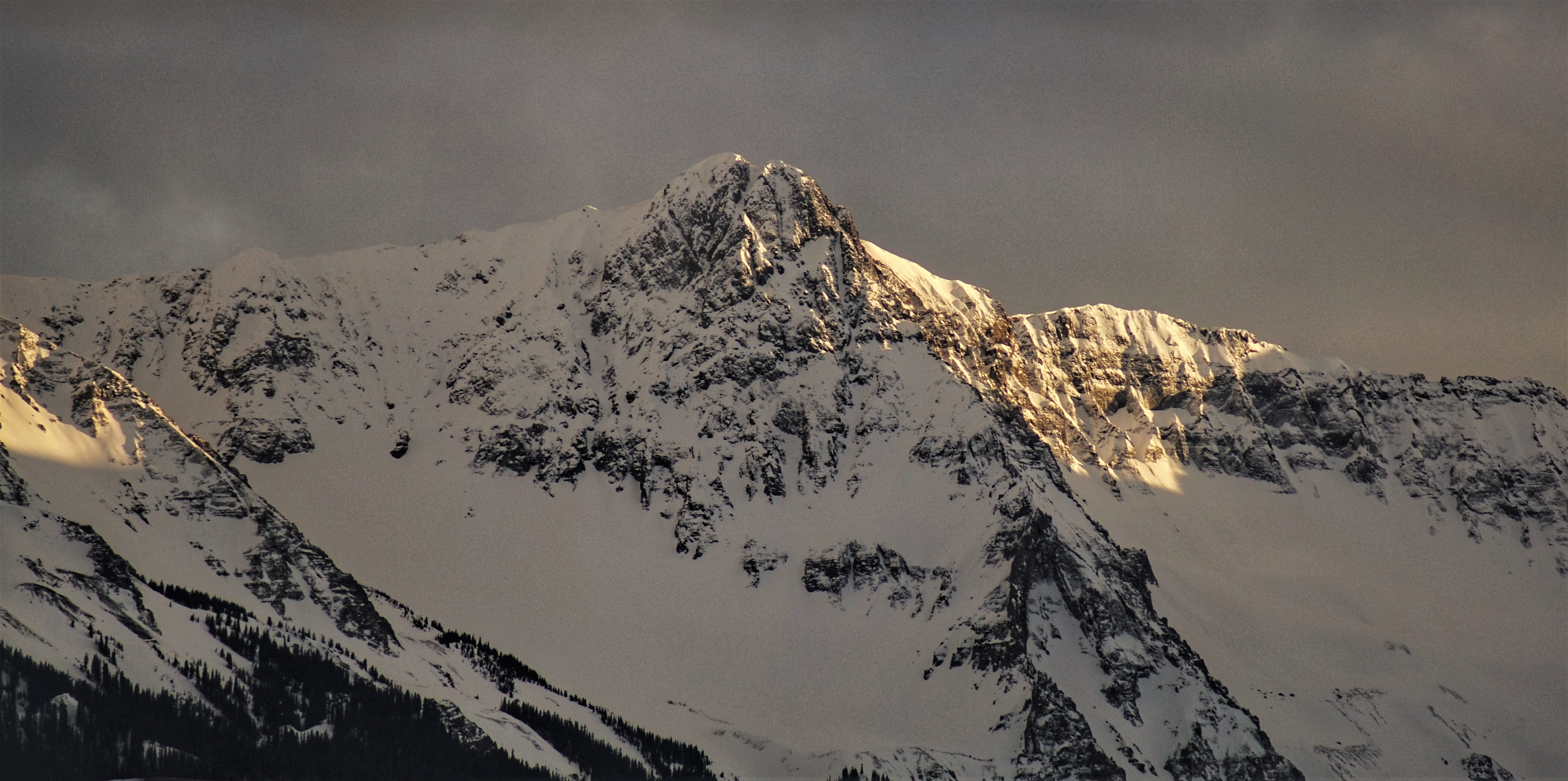
Northeast aspect

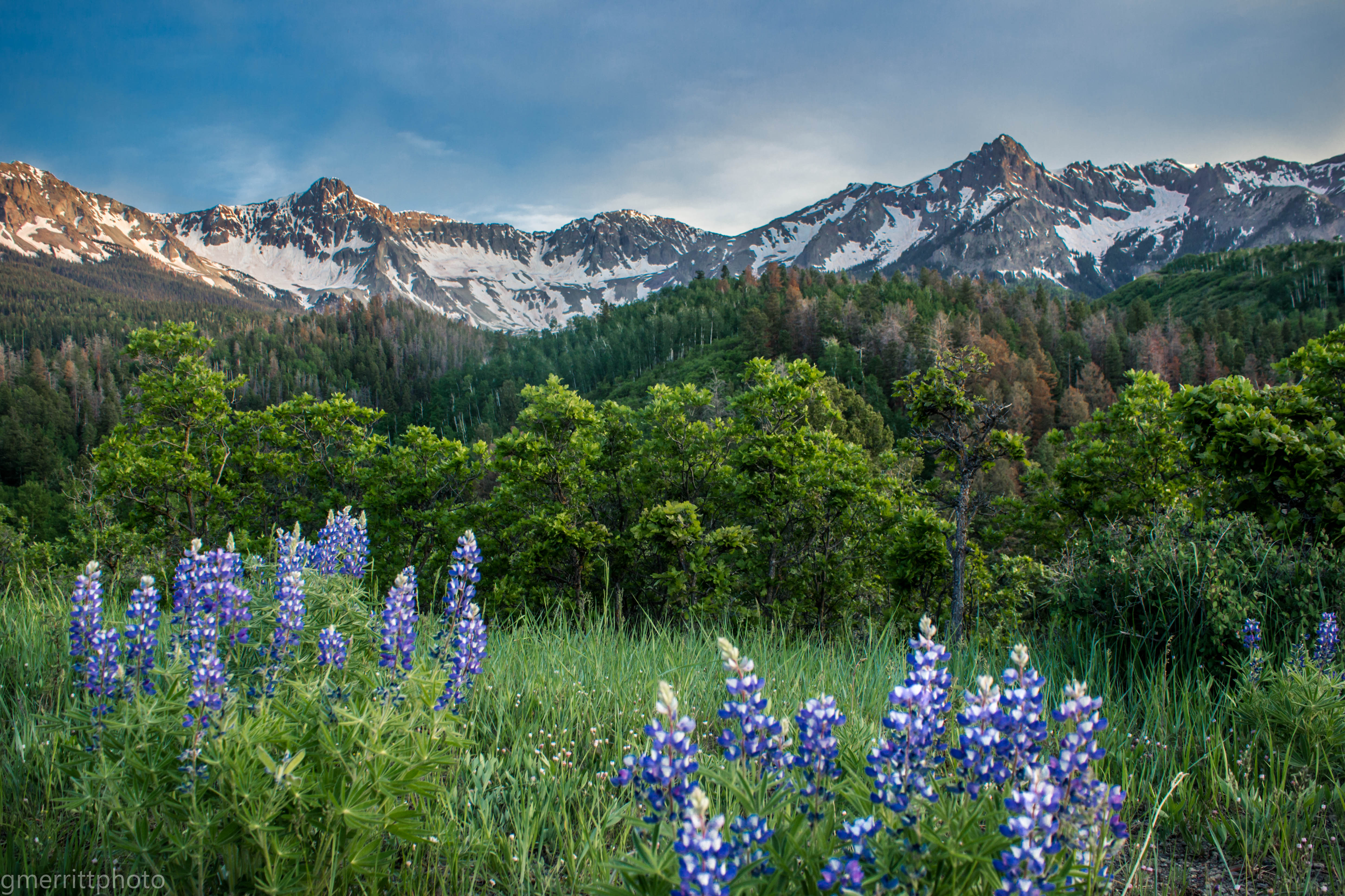
Mears Peak to left, "S9" to the right

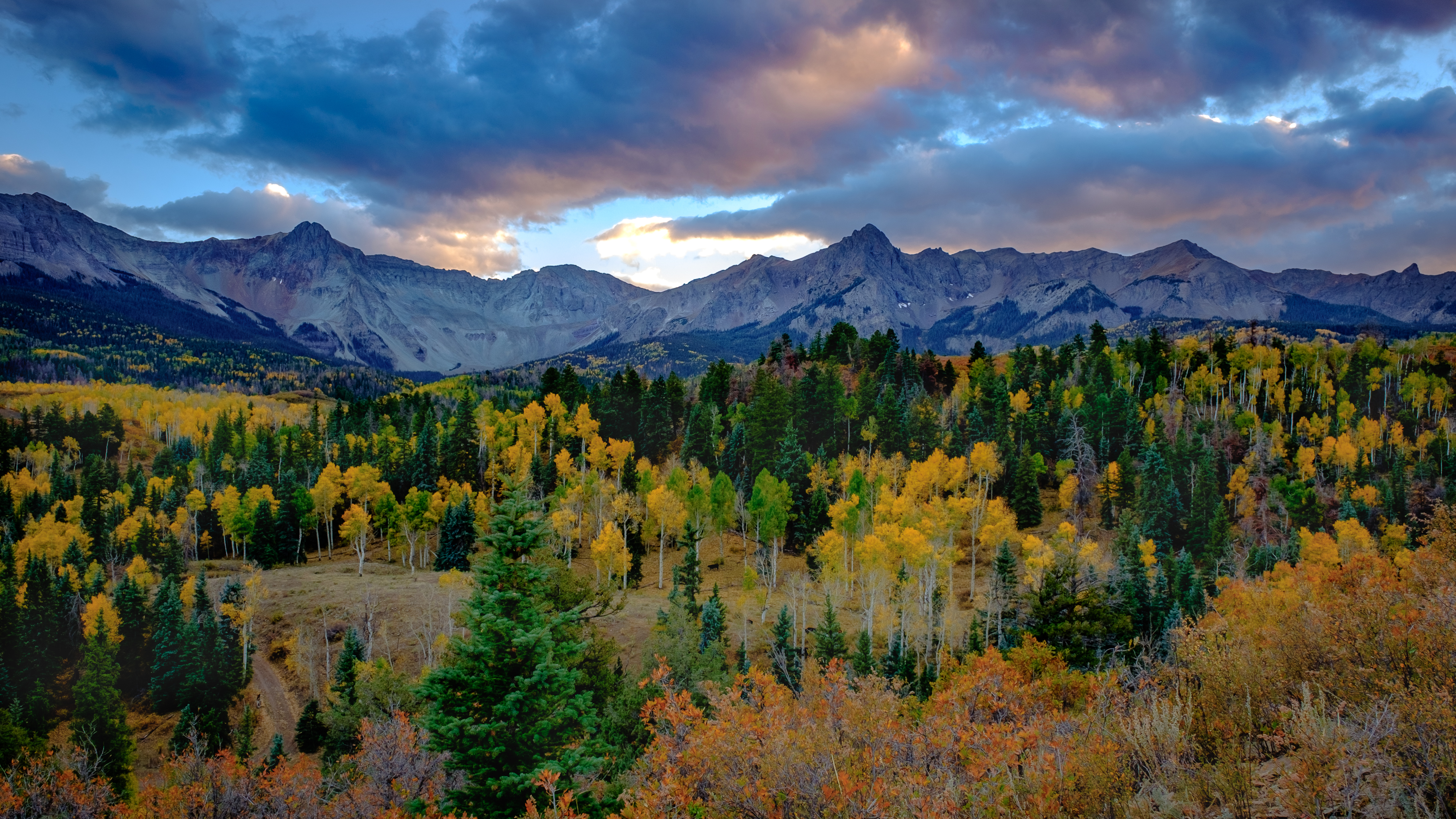
Sneffels Range, Mears Peak to left

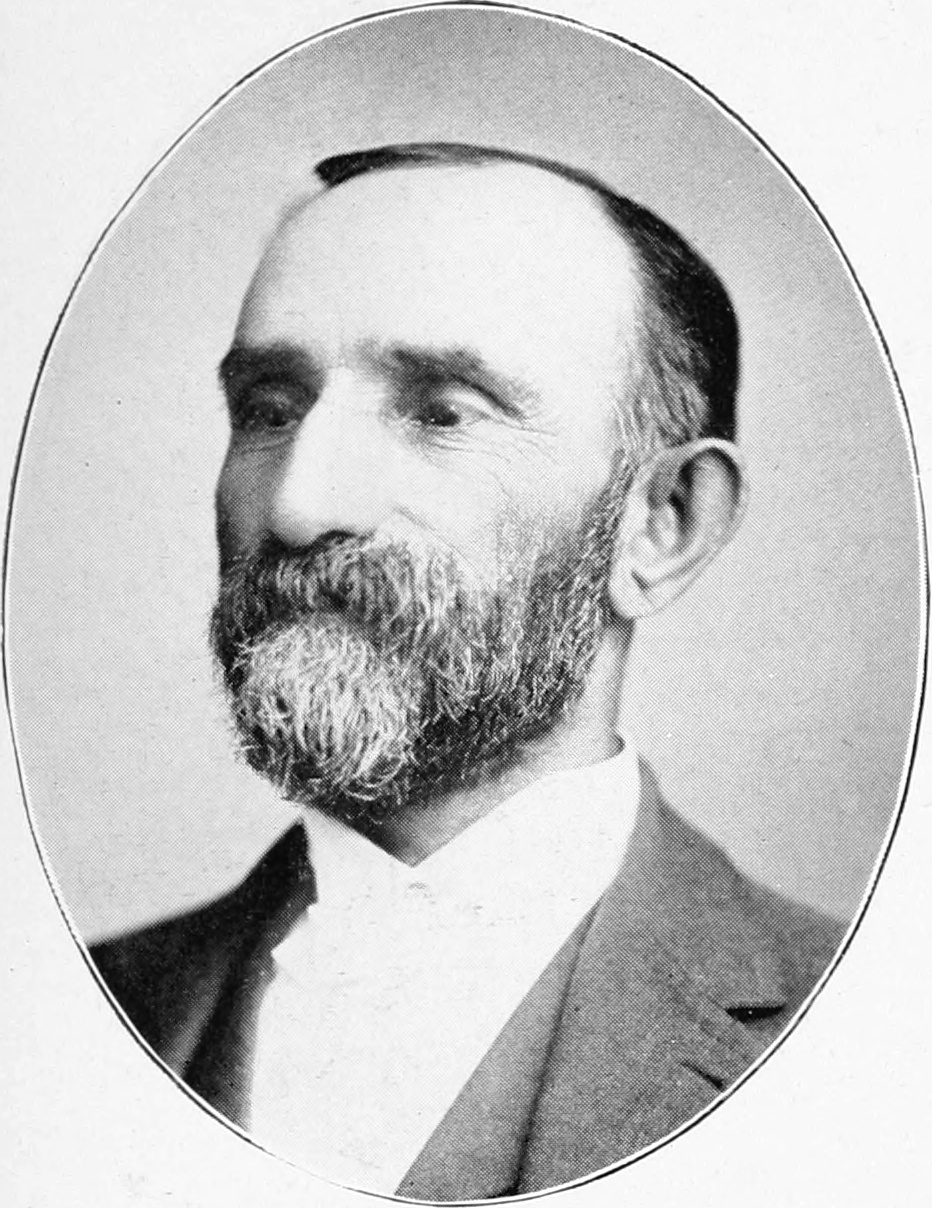
Otto Mears in 1902

== See also ==
- Mountains of Ouray County, Colorado
- Hayden Peak
