= North Poole =

North Poole may refer to:

- The northern areas of Poole, a town in Dorset, England
- Mid Dorset and North Poole (UK Parliament constituency)

== See also ==
- North Pool, a small, shallow pond near the North Pole
- North Pole (disambiguation)
