= South Pole (disambiguation) =

South Pole or Southpole may refer to:

== Terrestrial, celestial and planetary South Poles ==
- South Pole – the southernmost point on Earth (on the axis of rotation)
- South Magnetic Pole – the shifting point on the Earth's surface where the Earth's magnetic field points directly upwards
- South Geomagnetic Pole – the point of intersection of the Earth's surface with the axis of a simple magnetic dipole (like a bar magnet) that best approximates the Earth's actual more complex magnetic field
- Southern pole of inaccessibility – the point in Antarctica furthest from the sea
- South celestial pole – an imaginary point in the southern sky towards which the Earth's axis of rotation points
- South Pole Wall – a massive wall of galaxies extending over 1.3 billion light-years across the universe
- Lunar south pole, the south pole of the Moon
- For information about South Poles on other planets and Solar System bodies, see Poles of astronomical bodies

== Physics ==
- Originally by analogy with the Earth's magnetic field, the terms "north pole" and "south pole" are also applied to magnets in general

== Other ==
- The South Pole: An Account of the Norwegian Antarctic Expedition in the Fram, 1910–12, a 1912 book by Roald Amundsen
- South Pole Group, a financing company
- Southpole (clothing), a US clothing company

== See also ==
- North Pole (disambiguation)
- South (disambiguation)
- Pole (disambiguation)
