= North Pole (disambiguation) =

The North Pole (also known as the "Geographic North Pole" or "Terrestrial North Pole") is the point in the Northern Hemisphere where the Earth's axis of rotation meets its surface.

North Pole may also refer to:

== Terrestrial, celestial and planetary north poles ==
- North magnetic pole, the shifting point on the Earth's surface where the Earth's magnetic field points directly downwards
- North magnetic pole § North geomagnetic pole, the point of intersection of the Earth's surface with the axis of a simple magnetic dipole that best approximates the Earth's actual more complex magnetic field
- Northern pole of inaccessibility, the point in the Arctic Ocean furthest from land
- North celestial pole, an imaginary point in the northern sky towards which the Earth's axis of rotation points
- Lunar north pole, the north pole of the Moon

== Cities, towns, villages ==
- North Pole, Alaska
- North Pole, New York
- A locality in Marble Bar, Western Australia

== Other uses ==
- One end of a magnetic dipole; see Magnetism
- Northpole (film), a 2014 television film about Christmas
- North Pole depot, a train maintenance depot in London
- North Pole Peak, a summit in Colorado, US
- North Pole Stream, New Brunswick, Canada
- North Pole drift ice station, in the Arctic Ocean, including a list of stations
- IBM's NorthPole neuromorphic AI chip
- Northpole, a video series produced and directed by Peter North

== See also ==
- North Poole (disambiguation)
