= Mount Otto =

Mountain in the state of Colorado

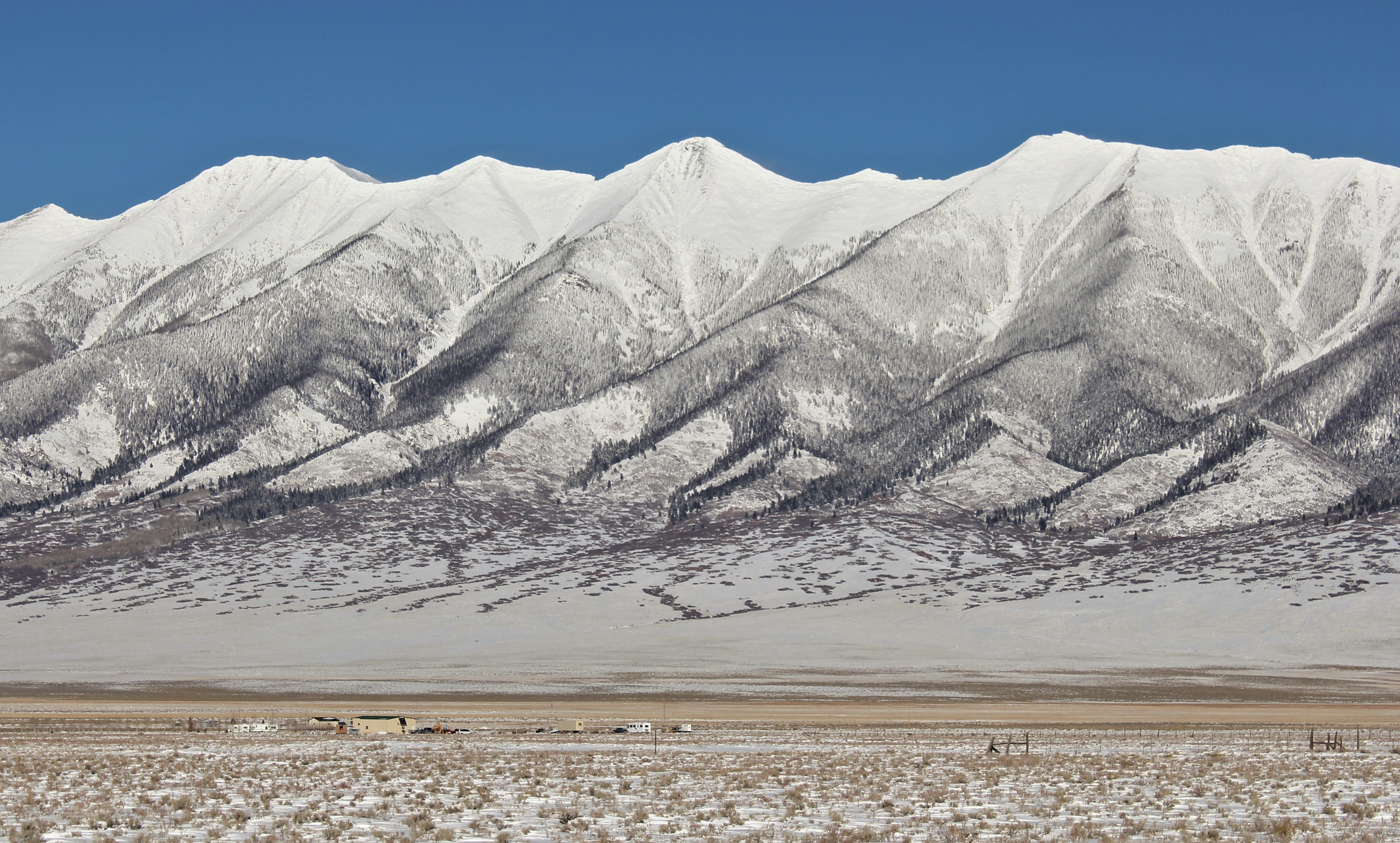
- Southwest aspect centered, from Highway 285 (Bushnell Peak to the left)

Highest point
- Elevation: 12,865 ft (3,921 m)
- Prominence: 406 ft (124 m)
- Parent peak: Bushnell Peak (13,110 ft)
- Isolation: 1.02 mi (1.64 km)
- Coordinates: 38°19′39″N 105°52′56″W

Geography
- Location within Colorado Location within the United States
- Country: United States
- State: Colorado
- County: Fremont County / Saguache County
- Protected area: Sangre de Cristo Wilderness
- Parent range: Rocky Mountains; Sangre de Cristo Range
- Topo map: USGS Bushnell Peak

Geology
- Mountain type: Fault block
- Rock type: Metamorphic rock

Climbing
- Easiest route: class 2 hiking

Mount Otto is a 12,865-foot (3,921 m) mountain summit on the boundary shared by Fremont County and Saguache County, in Colorado, United States.

== Description ==
Mount Otto is set 21 miles (34 km) east of the Continental Divide in the Sangre de Cristo Range which is a subrange of the Rocky Mountains. It is the fifth-highest summit in Fremont County and can be seen from Highway 285 near the community of Villa Grove. The mountain is located in the Sangre de Cristo Wilderness, on land managed by San Isabel National Forest and Rio Grande National Forest. Precipitation runoff from the mountain's west slope drains to San Luis Creek and the east slope drains to the Arkansas River. Topographic relief is significant as the summit rises 4,200 feet (1,280 m) above the San Luis Valley in two miles (3.2 km).

== Climate ==
According to the Köppen climate classification system, Mount Otto is located in an alpine subarctic climate zone with cold, snowy winters, and cool to warm summers. Due to its altitude, it receives precipitation all year, as snow in winter, and as thunderstorms in summer, with a dry period in late spring.

== Etymology ==
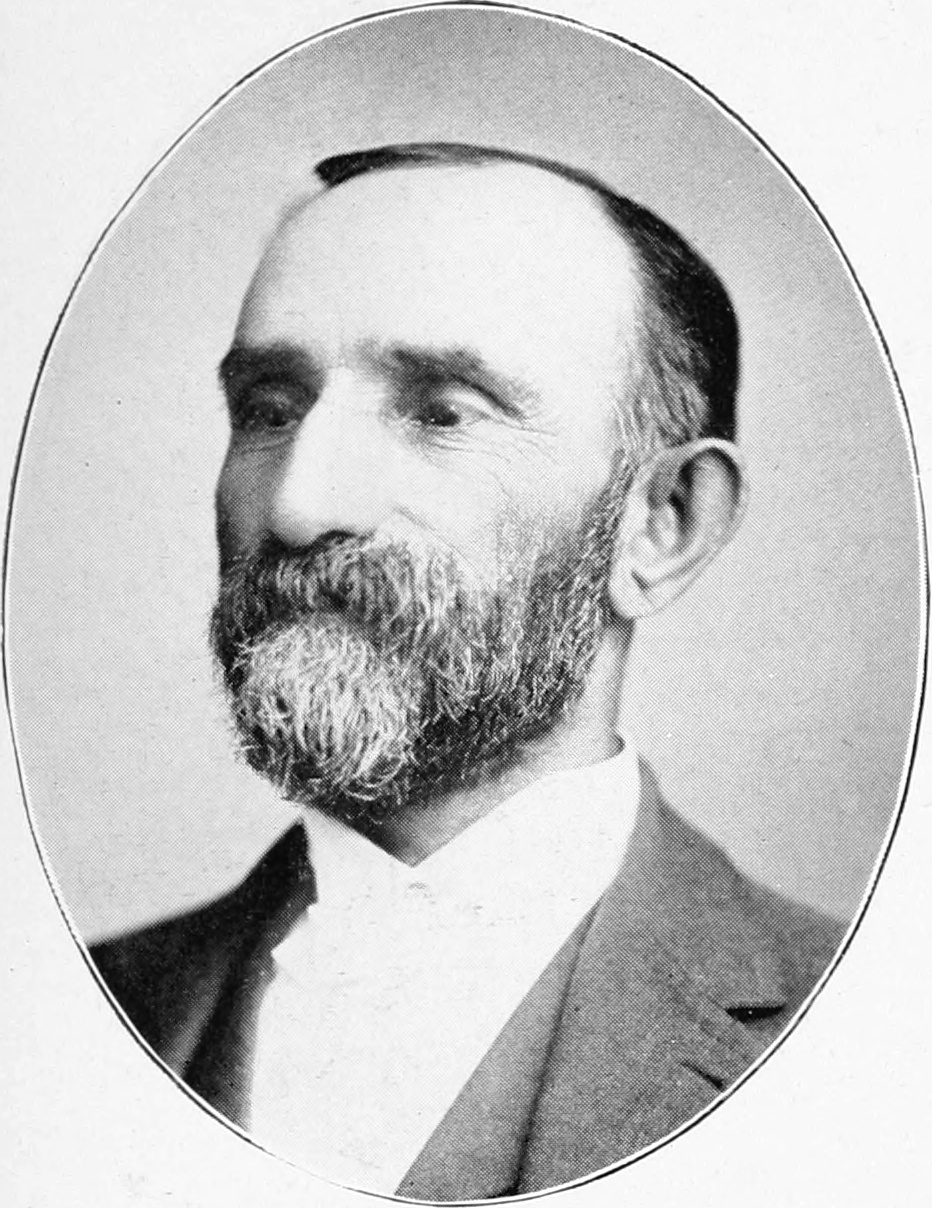
Otto Mears

The mountain's toponym was officially adopted in 1970 by the United States Board on Geographic Names to commemorate Otto Mears (1840–1931), early pioneer in the San Luis Valley and interpreter-negotiator for early Indian treaties, developer of roads, railroads, and mining and milling operations in the San Juan Mountains region. Notably, he built the Million Dollar Highway, and built and operated a historic toll road over nearby Poncha Pass into the valley. There is a Mears Peak in the Sneffels Range of the San Juans which is also named after him.

== See also ==
- Sangre de Cristo Mountains

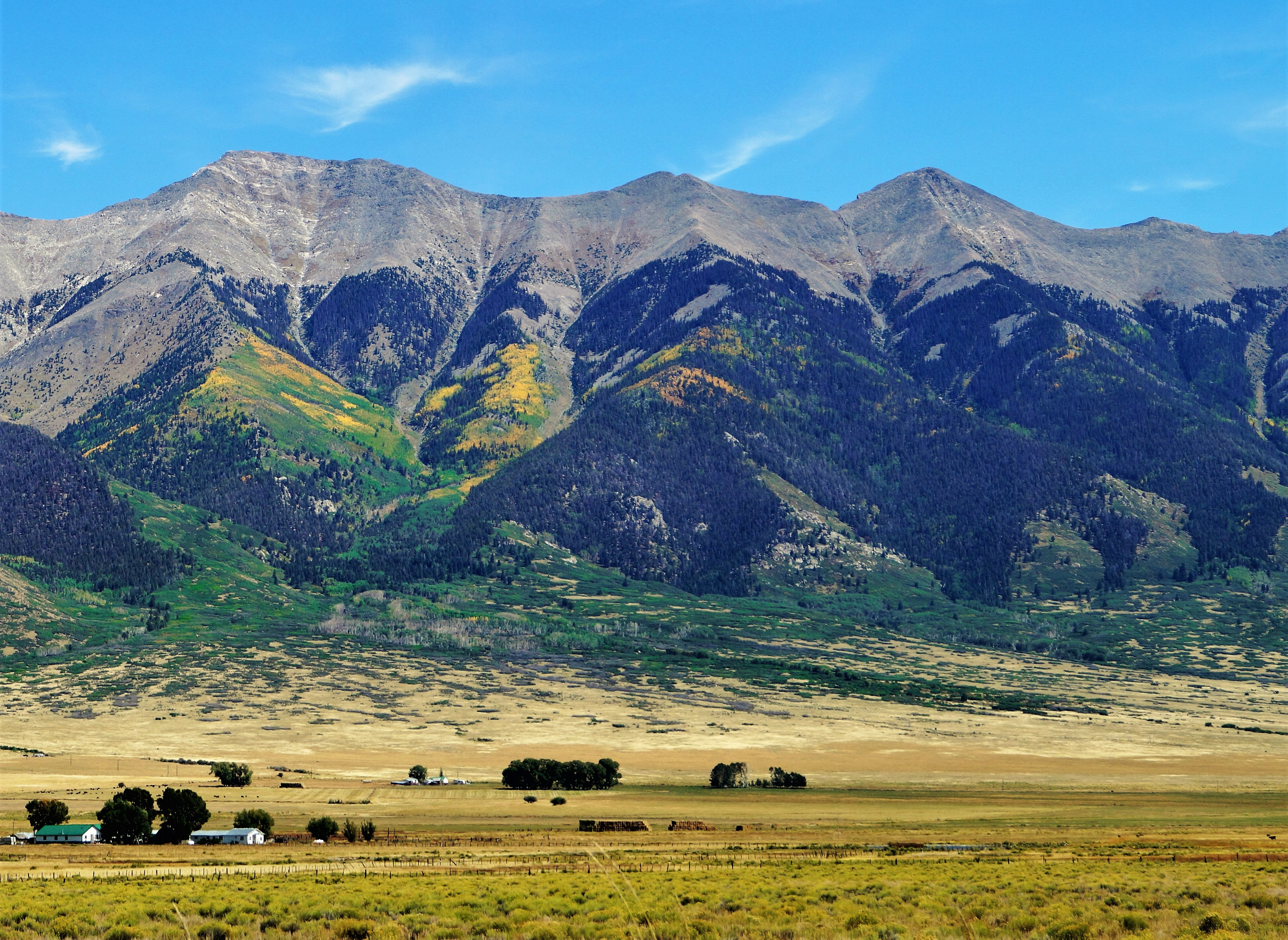
Bushnell Peak (left) and Mount Otto (right)

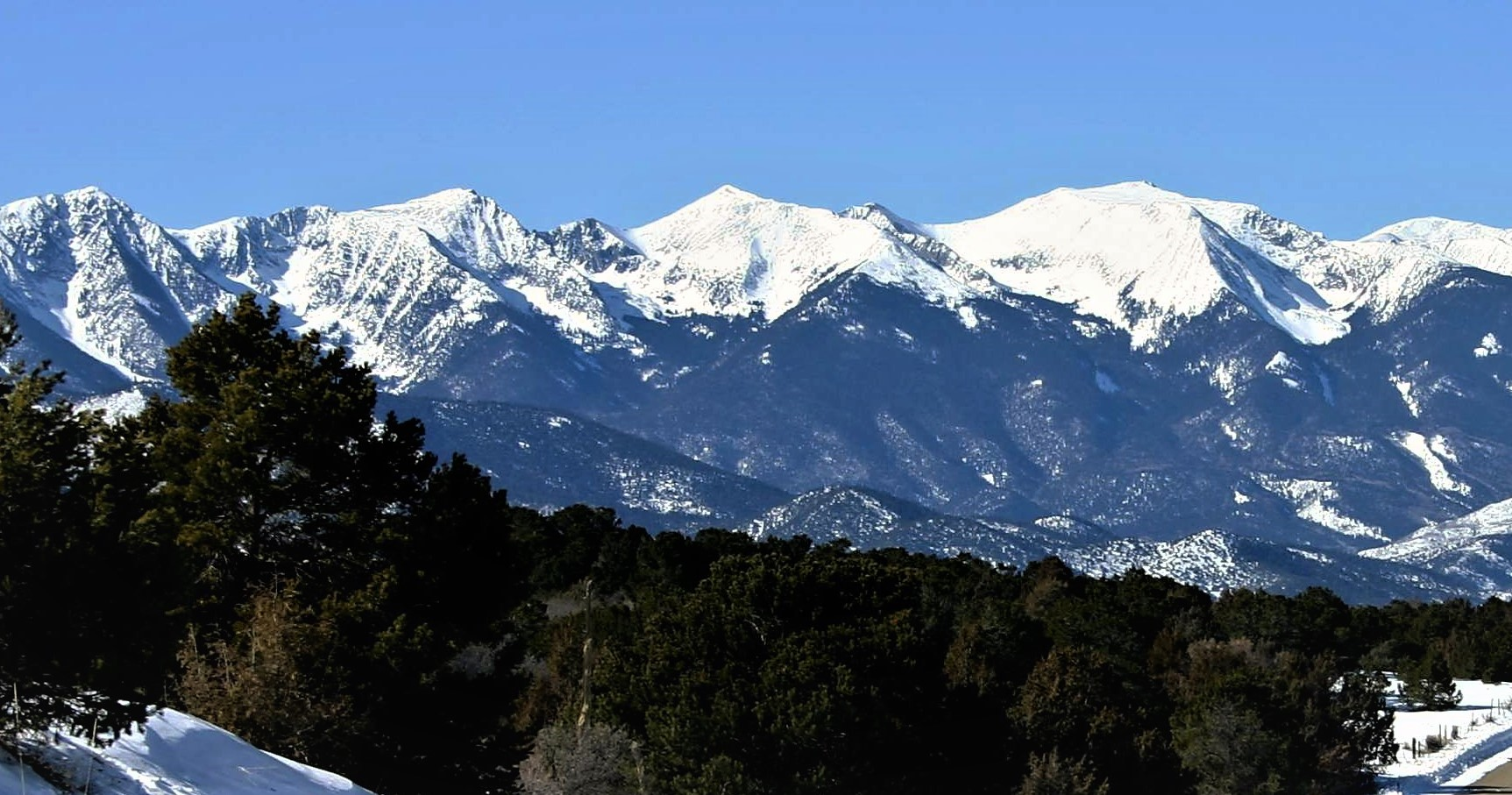
East aspect of Mount Otto centered, Bushnell Peak to the right.
