= North Pole Peak =

Mountain in Colorado, United States

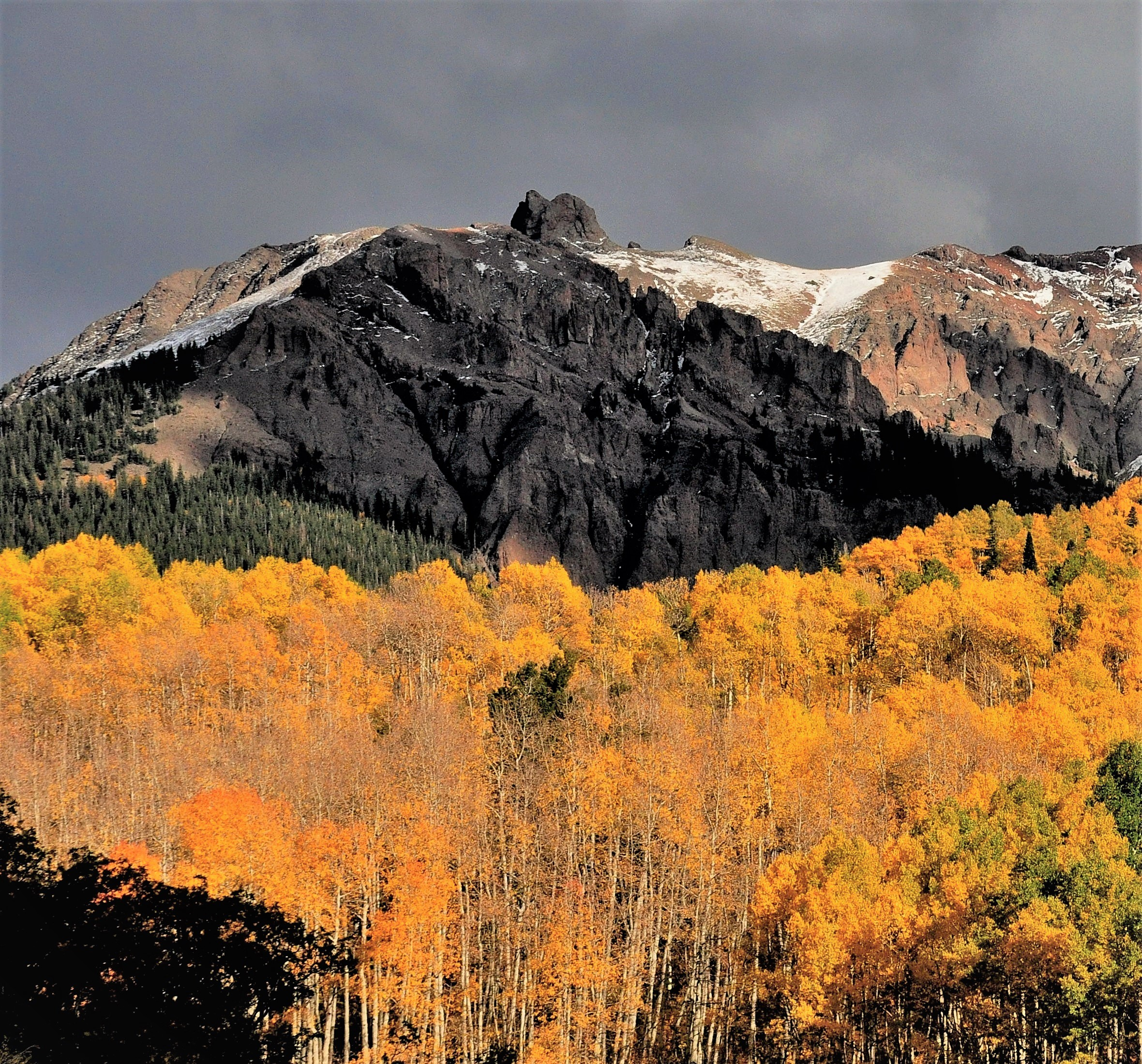
- West aspect

Highest point
- Elevation: 12,208 ft (3,721 m)
- Prominence: 108 ft (33 m)
- Parent peak: Hayden Peak (12,987 ft)
- Isolation: 0.25 mi (0.40 km)
- Coordinates: 38°02′19″N 107°54′54″W

Geography
- Location within Colorado Location within the United States
- Country: United States
- State: Colorado
- County: San Miguel
- Protected area: Mount Sneffels Wilderness
- Parent range: Rocky Mountains; San Juan Mountains; Sneffels Range
- Topo map: USGS Sams

Geology
- Rock type: Extrusive rock

Climbing
- Easiest route: class 5.6

North Pole Peak is a 12,208-foot-elevation (3,721-meter) mountain summit located in San Miguel County, Colorado, United States.

== Description ==
North Pole Peak is situated nine miles northwest of the community of Telluride in the Mount Sneffels Wilderness, on land managed by Uncompahgre National Forest. It is the northernmost peak of the Sneffels Range which is a subset of the San Juan Mountains, which in turn are part of the Rocky Mountains. North Pole Peak is situated west of the Continental Divide and 0.65 mile north-northwest of Hayden Peak, the nearest higher neighbor. Precipitation runoff from the mountain drains to Leopard Creek which is a tributary of the San Miguel River. Topographic relief is significant as the summit rises 1,200 feet (370 meters) above Middle Fork Leopard Creek in 0.3 mile. The challenging ascent of the peak involves 10 miles of hiking (round-trip) with 1,850-feet of elevation gain to reach the summit block. This mountain's toponym has been officially adopted by the U.S. Board on Geographic Names.

== Climate ==
According to the Köppen climate classification system, North Pole Peak is located in an alpine subarctic climate zone with long, cold, snowy winters, and cool to warm summers. Due to its altitude, it receives precipitation all year, as snow in winter and as thunderstorms in summer, with a dry period in late spring.

== Gallery ==
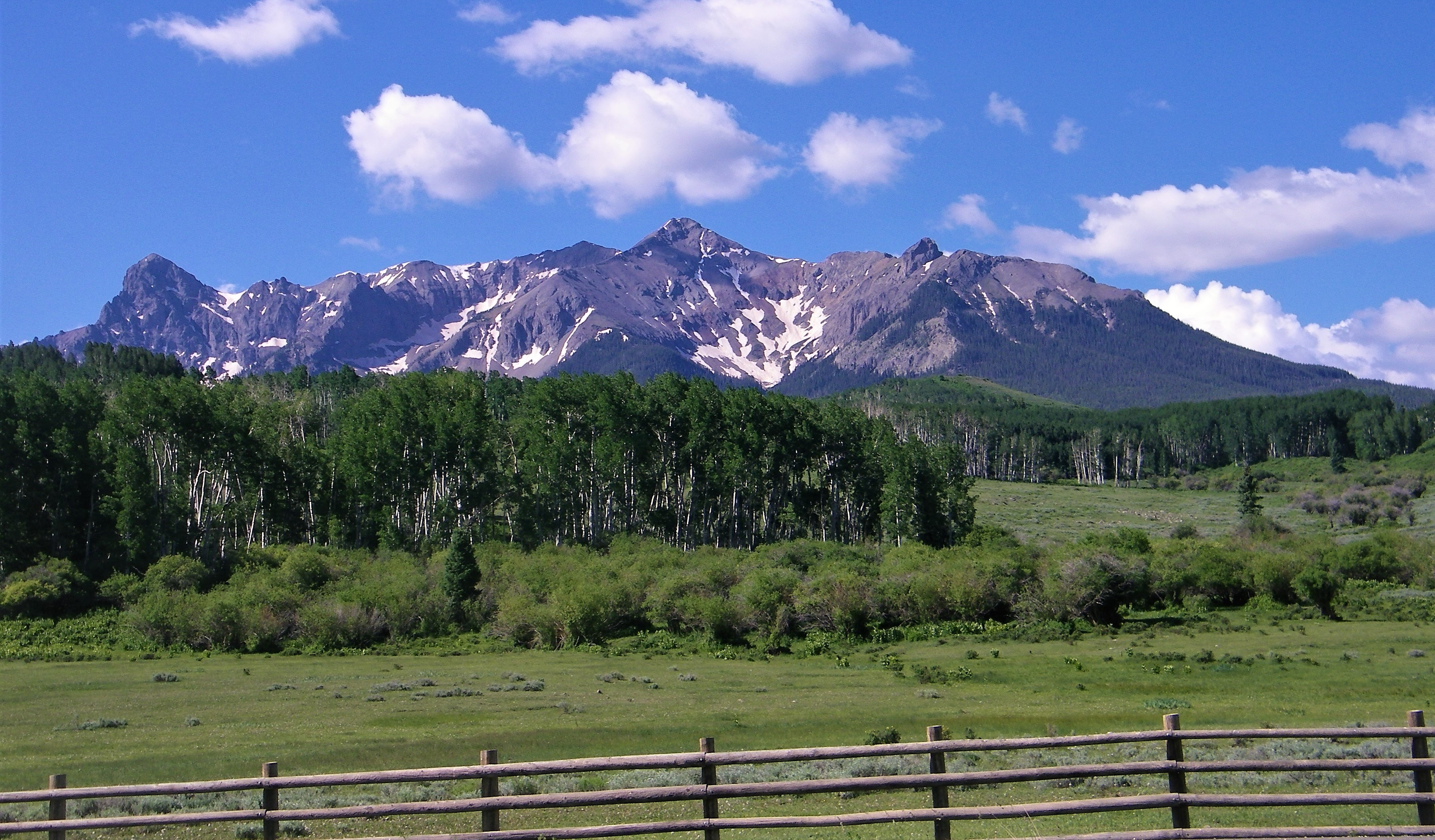
Hayden Peak centered, North Pole Peak to right

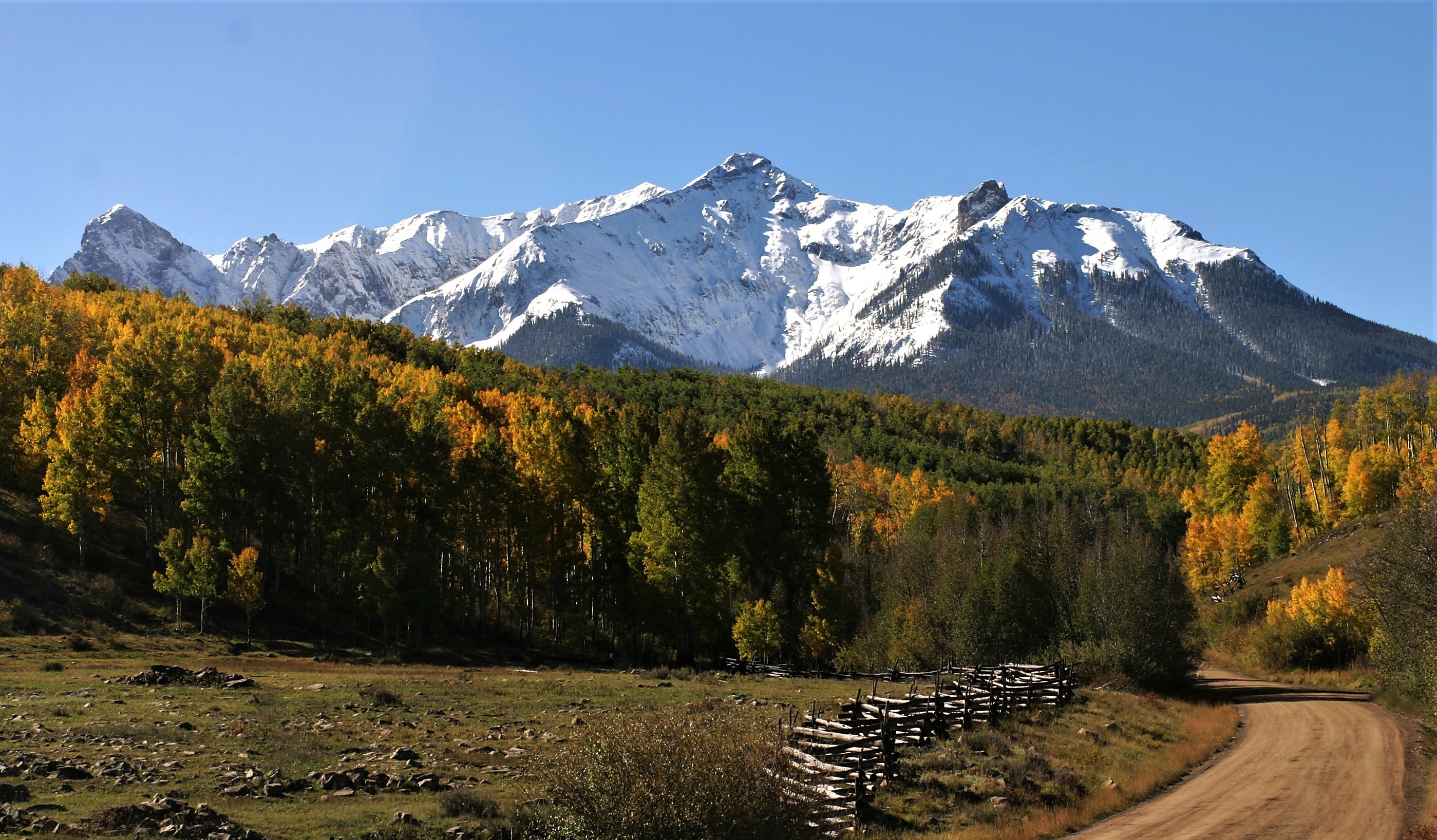
Hayden Peak centered, North Pole Peak to right

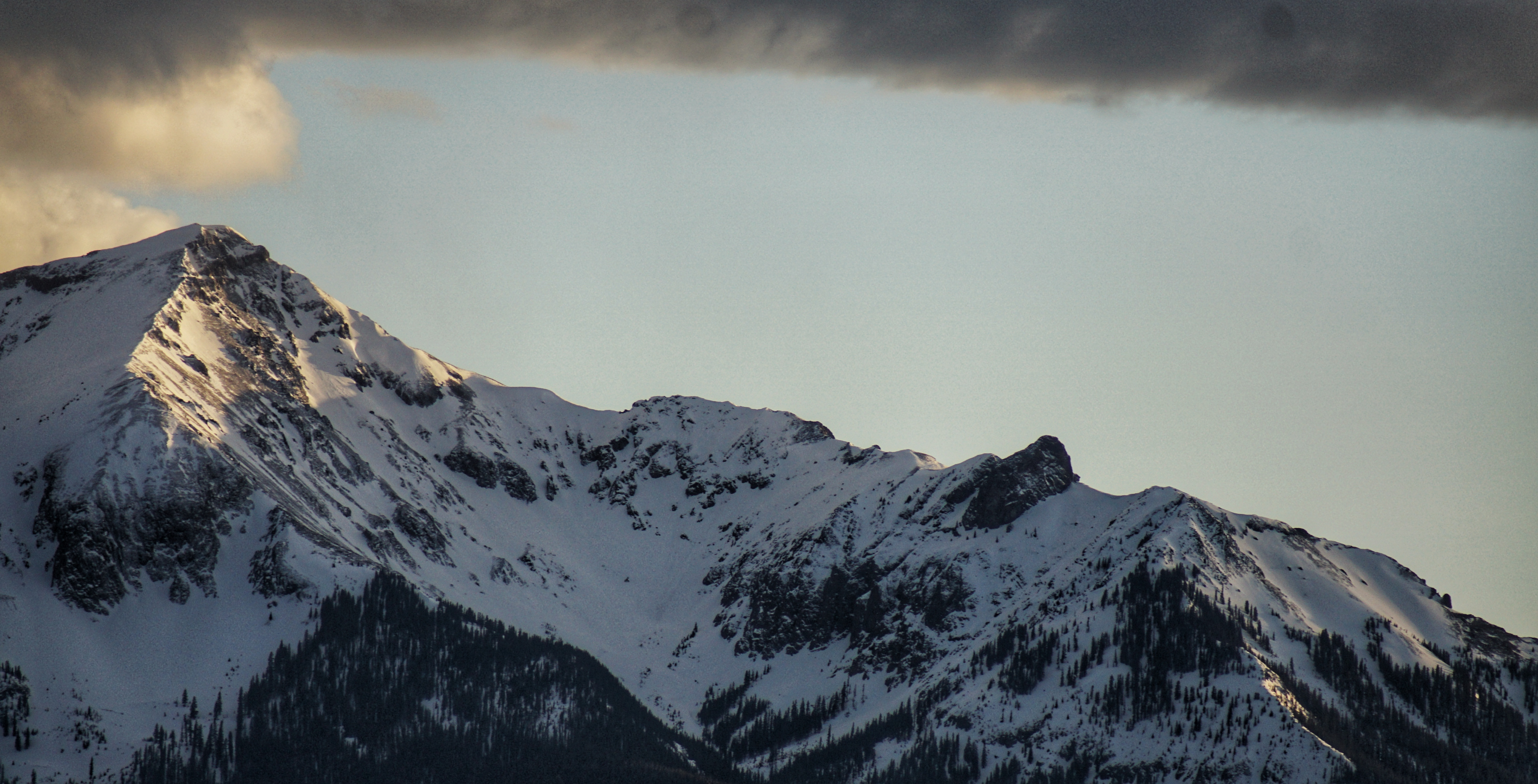
Hayden Peak (left) with little North Pole Peak to right

== See also ==
- Mountains of San Miguel County, Colorado
