= Lake North Pole =

Pond near the North Pole that is currently the northernmost in the world

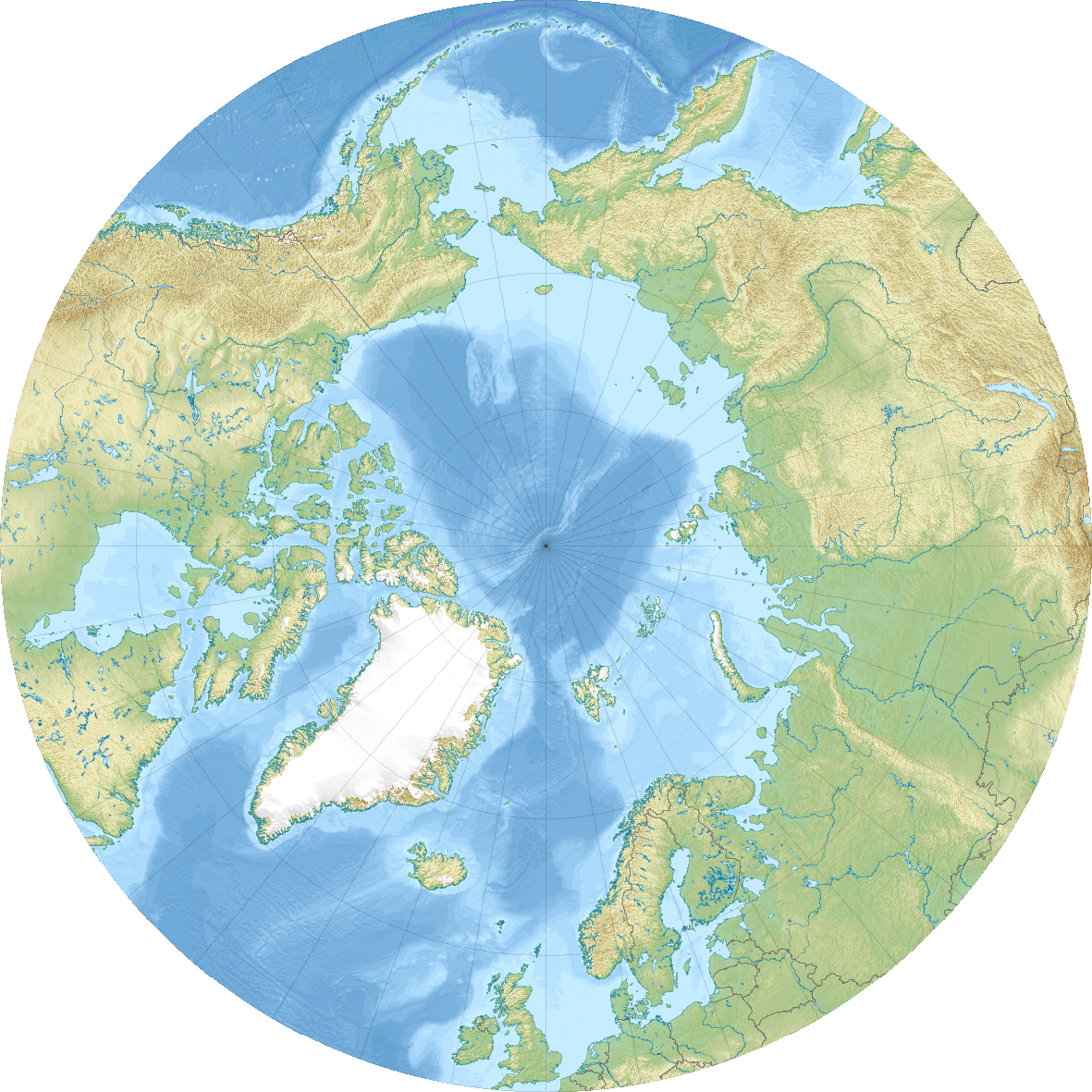
- Location within Arctic
- Coordinates: 85°N 5°W
- Average depth: Approx. 40 cm (16 in)
- Frozen: Annually
- Islands: None

Lake North Pole is a small, shallow, melt pond near the North Pole, and is currently the northernmost pond in the world. It came into existence in 2002, occurring each year, then freezing over in the winter.

The pond, which is approximately one foot (about 30 cm) deep, is composed almost entirely of fresh water melted from the ice beneath.

A web camera is stationed beside the pond to monitor changes. It was built by the Polar Science Center.

Members of the scientific community are not alarmed by such bodies of water, as they are widely occurring and are often referred to as "melt ponds."

== See also ==
- List of northernmost items
