= Hayden Peak (Pitkin County, Colorado) =

Mountain in the state of Colorado

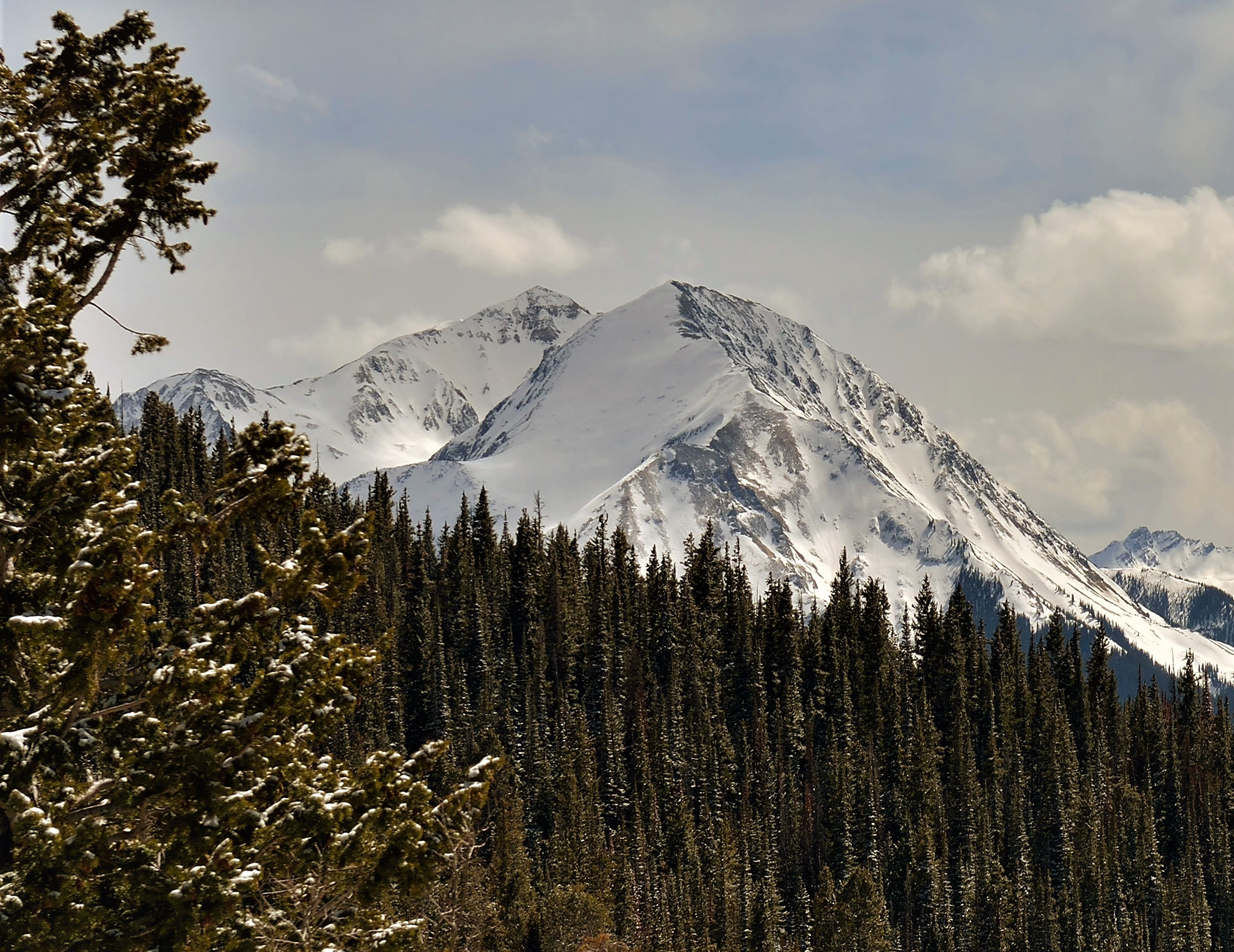
- North aspect, behind "Ski Hayden Peak"

Highest point
- Elevation: 13,570 ft (4,136 m)
- Prominence: 176 ft (54 m)
- Isolation: 0.82 mi (1.32 km)
- Coordinates: 39°03′33″N 106°51′07″W

Geography
- Location within Colorado Location within the United States
- Country: United States
- State: Colorado
- County: Pitkin County
- Protected area: Maroon Bells–Snowmass Wilderness
- Parent range: Rocky Mountains; Elk Mountains
- Topo map: USGS Hayden Peak

Geology
- Rock type: Hornfels

Climbing
- Easiest route: class 2

Hayden Peak is a 13,570-foot (4,136 m) mountain summit in Pitkin County, Colorado, United States.

== Description ==
Hayden Peak is located 15 miles (24 km) west of the Continental Divide in the Elk Mountains which are a subrange of the Rocky Mountains. The mountain is situated 10 miles (16 km) south of the community of Aspen and 3.6 miles (5.8 km) north of Castle Peak. The peak is set in the Maroon Bells–Snowmass Wilderness on land managed by White River National Forest. Precipitation runoff from the mountain's slopes drains into tributaries of the Roaring Fork River which is a tributary of the Colorado River. Topographic relief is significant as the summit rises 3,770 feet (1,149 m) above Conundrum Creek in 1.6 miles (2.6 km) and 4,170 feet (1,271 m) above Castle Creek in 2.9 miles (4.7 km).

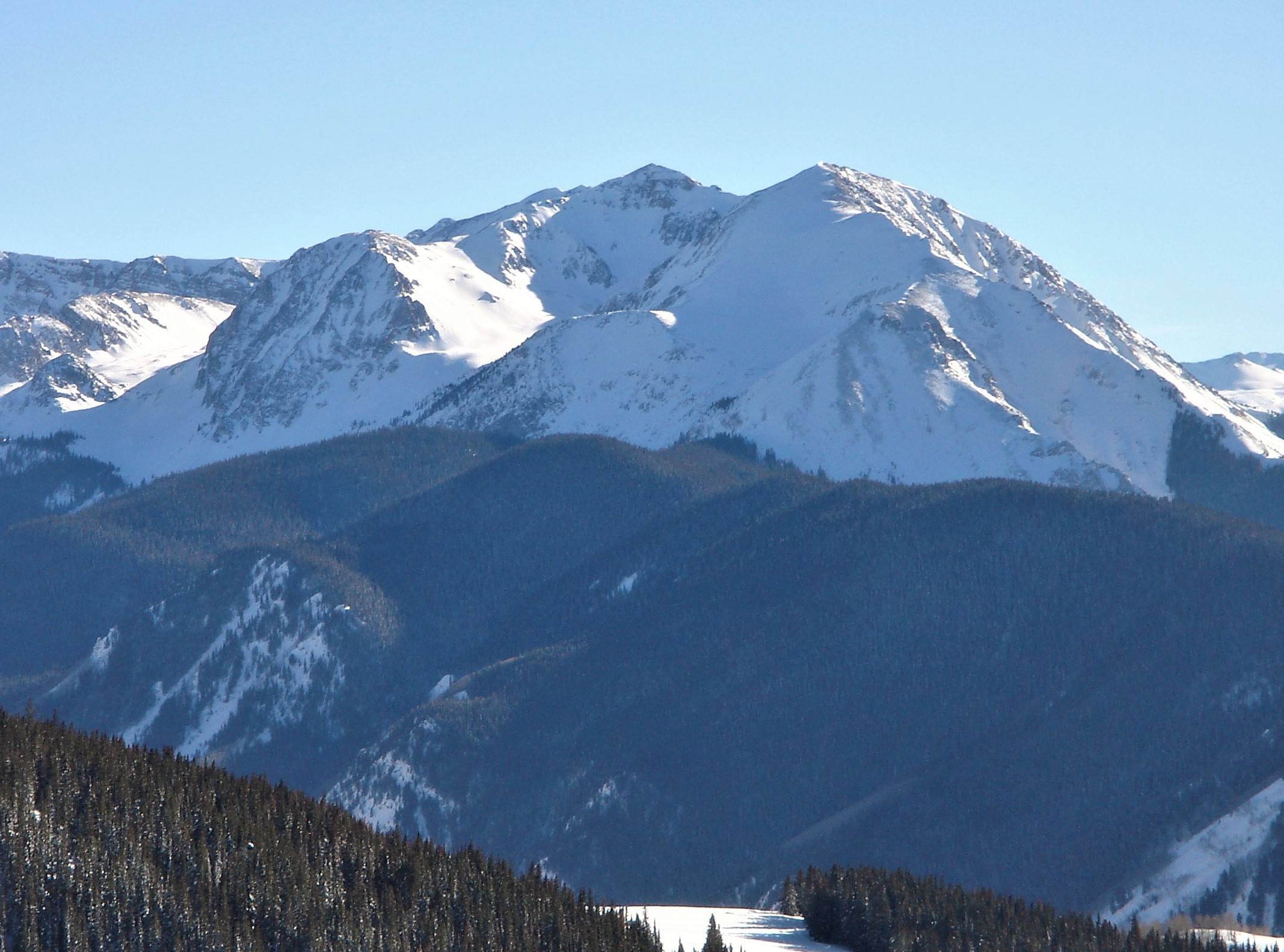
Northeast aspect of Hayden Peak in winter

== Etymology ==
The mountain's toponym has been officially adopted by the United States Board on Geographic Names, and has been reported in publications since at least 1906. An 1884 publication reported a "Hayden's Peak" in Pitkin County. Ferdinand Vandeveer Hayden (1829–1887) was an American geologist noted for his pioneering surveys of the Rocky Mountains and has several mountain peaks named after him. In 1877, he issued his Geological and Geographical Atlas of Colorado and Portions of Adjacent Territory.

== Climate ==
According to the Köppen climate classification system, Hayden Peak is located in an alpine subarctic climate zone with cold, snowy winters, and cool to warm summers. Due to its altitude, it receives precipitation all year, as snow in winter and as thunderstorms in summer, with a dry period in late spring.

== See also ==
- Mountains of Pitkin County, Colorado
- Thirteener
