= Mount Sneffels Wilderness =

U.S. Wilderness Area in southwest Colorado managed by the Uncompahgre National Forest

- IUCN category Ib (wilderness area)
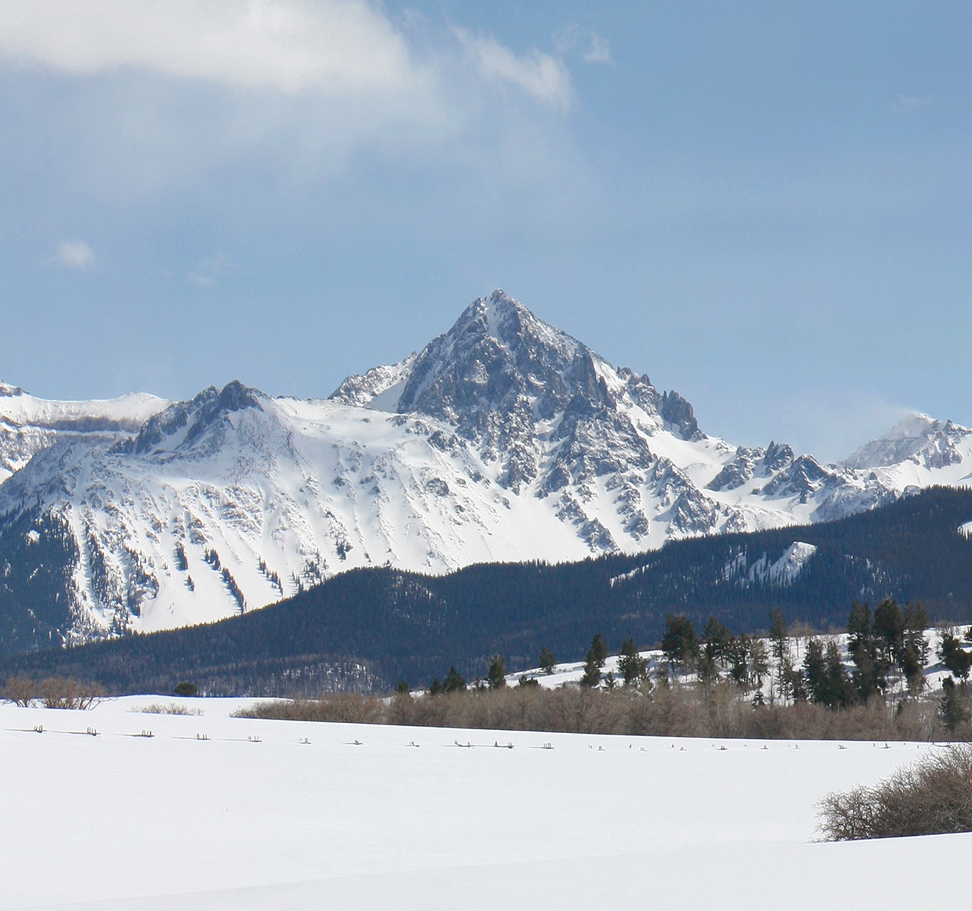
- Mount Sneffels

- Location within the United States
- Location: Ouray / San Miguel counties, Colorado, USA
- Nearest city: Ouray, CO
- Coordinates: 38°0′35″N 107°51′41″W
- Area: 16,566 acres (67.04 km^{2})
- Established: January 1, 1980
- Governing body: U.S. Forest Service

The Mount Sneffels Wilderness is a wilderness area in southwest Colorado managed by the Uncompahgre National Forest. It is about 5 miles (8.0 km) west of the town of Ouray. The area is named for Mt. Sneffels, which at 14,150 feet (4,310 m) is a prominent fourteener in the San Juan Mountains. The word "Sneffels" is likely an Americanization of the Old Norse word for Snæfell "snow mountain", which is also the namesake of the Snæfellsnes peninsula and Snæfellsjökull volcano in Iceland.

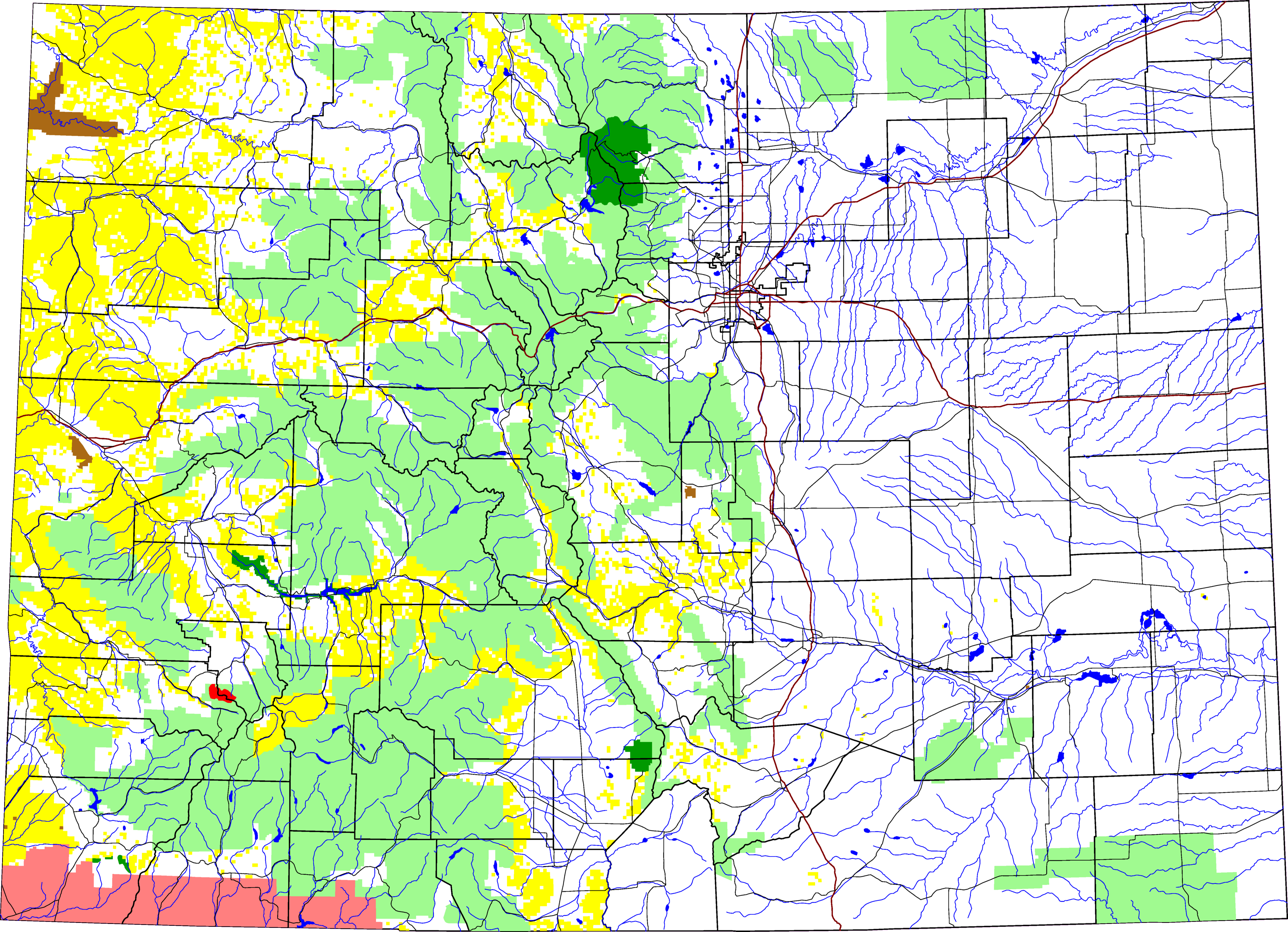
Colorado with Mount Sneffels Wilderness in red highlighted

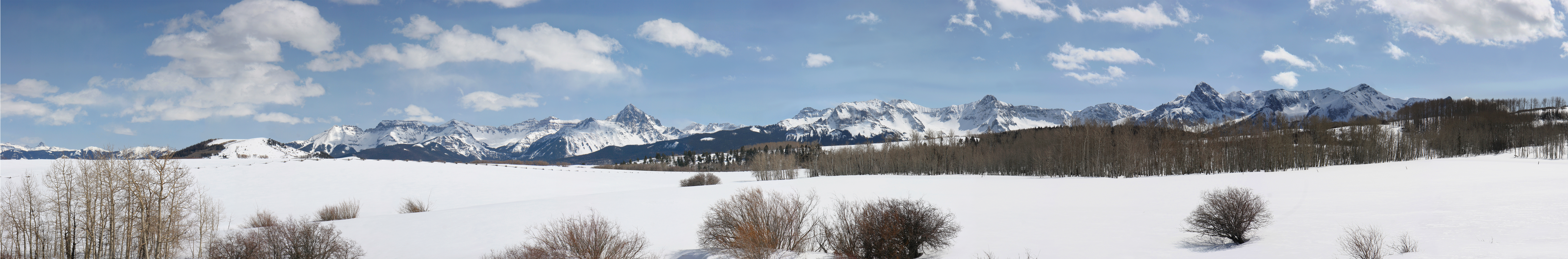
Panorama of the Sneffels sub-range of the San Juan Mountains, photographed from Dallas Divide pass. Most of these peaks are within the Sneffels Wilderness.
