= Darrel Meisenheimer =

American football player (1927–)

No. 33
- Position: Safety

Personal information
- Born: April 30, 1927; Wellsford, Kansas, U.S.
- Died: February 15, 1997 (aged 69); Grand Junction, Colorado, U.S.
- Listed height: 5 ft 10 in (1.78 m)
- Listed weight: 195 lb (88 kg)

Career information
- High school: Attica (Attica, Kansas)
- College: Oklahoma A&M (1947–1950)
- NFL draft: 1951: 17th round, 200th overall pick

Career history
- Detroit Lions (1951)*; New York Yanks (1951); Dallas Texans (1952)*
- * Offseason or practice squad member only
- Stats at Pro Football Reference

Darrel David Meisenheimer (April 30, 1927 – February 15, 1997) was an American professional football safety who played for the New York Yanks of the National Football League (NFL). He played college football for the Oklahoma A&M Cowboys and was selected by the Detroit Lions in the 17th round of the 1951 NFL draft.

== Early life ==
Darrel David Meisenheimer was born on April 30, 1927, in Wellsford, Kansas. He grew up on a farm in Attica, Kansas. He played "all sports" at Attica High School and graduated in 1945.

== College career ==
Meisenheimer accepted an athletic scholarship to attend Oklahoma Agricultural and Mechanical College and play college football for the Cowboys. However, his enrollment was delayed after he was drafted into the United States Army and sent to Alaska. After his service stint ended, he was a four-year letterman at Oklahoma State from 1947 to 1950. Meisenheimer graduated from Oklahoma A&M with a bachelor's degree in education.

== Professional career ==
Meisenheimer was selected by the Detroit Lions in the 17th round, with the 200th overall pick, of the 1951 NFL draft. He was released on September 24, 1951, before the start of the regular season.

Meisenheimer later signed with the NFL's New York Yanks. He played in nine games, all starts at safety, for the Yanks during the 1951 season, recording three interceptions for 26 yards and one fumble recovery for 11 yards. The Yanks finished the year with a 1–9–2 record and folded afterwards. In 1952, their entire roster was purchased by the upstart Dallas Texans. Meisenheimer was released by the Texans on September 23, 1952, before the start of the regular season.

== Personal life ==
In 1953, Meisenheimer was a teacher and assistant football coach at Trinidad High School in Trinidad, Colorado. He was the head football coach at Palisade High School in Palisade, Colorado, from 1954 to 1958, helping them win their first state title in 1958. He then coached at Central High School in Grand Junction, Colorado, for five years.

Meisenheimer earned a Master of Arts degree in administration from Western State College of Colorado in 1965. He was a high school wrestling referee for 17 years. He was an administrator at West Junior High School from 1973 to 1984. Meisenheimer retired in 1984 after 51 years of working at School District 51. He died on February 15, 1997, in Grand Junction, Colorado.
