= Loma, Colorado =

Census-designated place in Mesa County, CO, USA

- Census-designated place
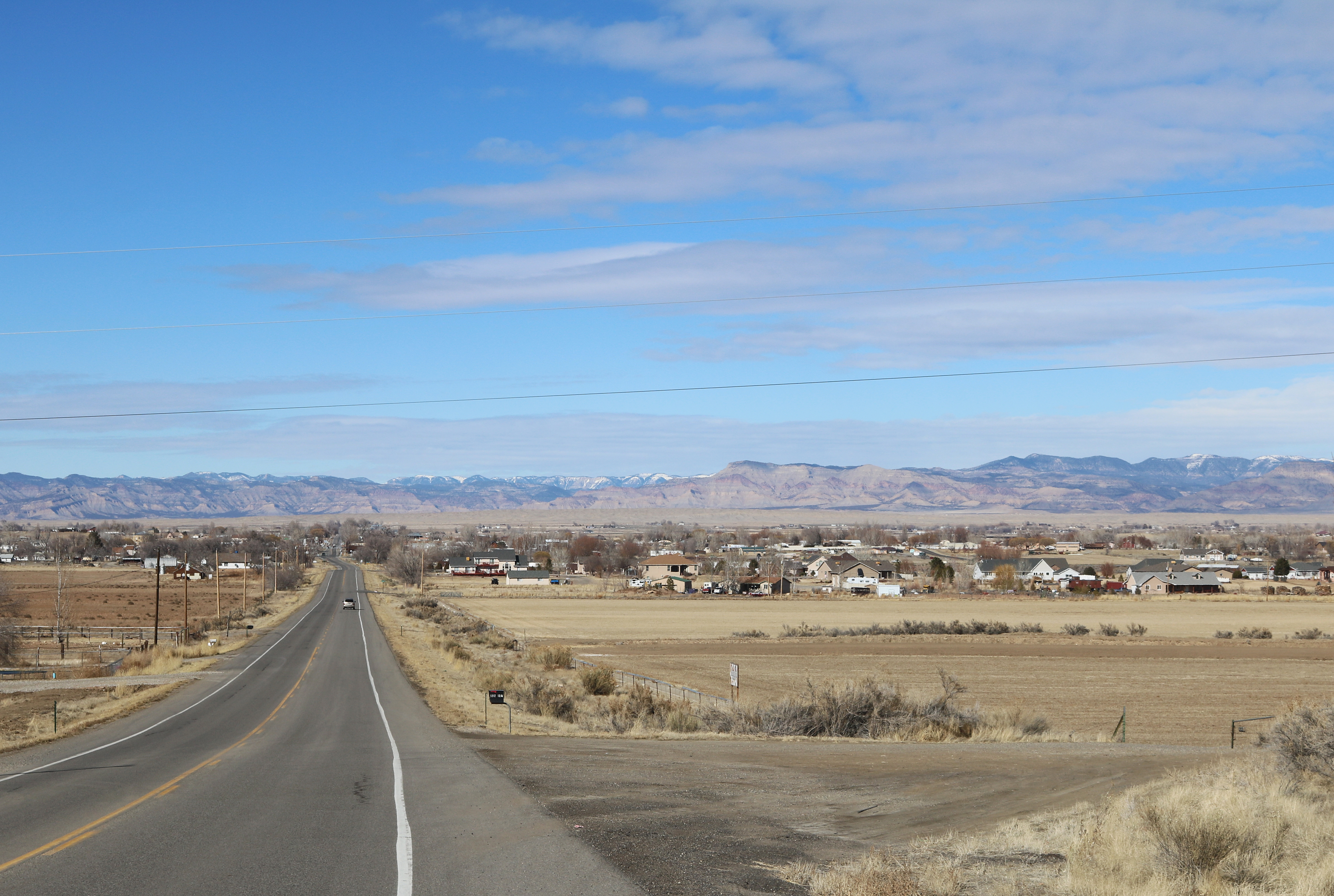
- Loma and Colorado State Highway 139

- Location in Mesa County, Colorado
- Coordinates: 39°12′27″N 108°48′18″W
- Country: United States
- State: Colorado
- County: Mesa

Government
  - Type: Unincorporated town

Area
  - Total: 10.889 sq mi (28.20 km^{2})
  - Land: 10.889 sq mi (28.20 km^{2})
  - Water: 0.0 sq mi (0 km^{2})
- Elevation: 4,524 ft (1,379 m)

Population (2020)
  - Total: 1,314
  - Density: 120.7/sq mi (46.59/km^{2})
- Time zone: UTC-7 (MST)
  - Summer (DST): UTC-6 (MDT)
- ZIP Code: 81524
- Area code: 970
- GNIS feature: 2629991

Loma is an unincorporated town, post office, and census-designated place (CDP) located in and governed by Mesa County, Colorado, United States. It is part of the Grand Junction, CO Metropolitan Statistical Area. The Loma post office has the ZIP Code 81524. At the 2020 census, the population of the Loma CDP was 1,314.

== History ==
The name "Loma" is derived from a Spanish word meaning "small hill".

The area was first inhabited by the Ute people, who had left by 1881.

In 1882, the Denver and Rio Grande Western Railroad completed a narrow-gauge railroad through Loma. A standard-gauge track was installed in 1890.

Homesteaders began arriving in Loma in the late 1880s. Agriculture became a dominant feature in Loma's early economy, enabled by the completion of the Kiefer Extension irrigation canal in 1899. The railway provided easy shipment of crops and livestock to larger cities like Denver and Salt Lake City.

The first school was established in the 1890s, and the two-story Loma School was constructed in 1910 from yellow brick, fired on the grounds. The brick school remained in use until 1982, when Loma Elementary School opened.

In 1901, the Colorado Sugar Company opened 1,000 acres (400 ha) of land near Loma to settlers. Sugar beets were a primary crop, and beet production dominated Loma's agriculture until the 1970s, when the Delta Sugar Beet factory closed. Potatoes were also grown by Loma farmers.

The Loma post office opened in 1905, and has continued in operation since.

In 1910, the church now known as Loma Community Church was built. It has often been referred to as "The Church That Stayed". Virginia Donoho produced a 15,000 word history of the church by that same name in the early 1980s. In 1965 the building added indoor plumbing, a fellowship hall, a kitchen, and two bathrooms. In the late 1970s a small addition was built.

Verner Zevola Reed, known as "The Colorado Millionaire"", opened the Golden Hills ranch on 1,200 acres (490 ha) of land he had purchased 2 mi (3.2 km) north of Loma in 1907. Reed intended on growing apples, and installed an underground irrigation system to water his orchards. In 1911, the Loma Canning and Preserving Company opened a canning factory in Loma to process the anticipated harvests. The endeavor was not a success, and the factory closed a few years later without ever reaching its capacity. Reed sold the Golden Hills Ranch in 1923.

A second irrigation canal called the Highline Canal was built through Loma in 1917, and led to significant economic growth and several bumper crops during the 1920s.

By 1923, Loma had a school, blacksmith, garage, railroad station, school, two-story hotel, shipping yard, post office, pool hall, two churches, two grocery stores, and many two-story homes.

During the Depression, the federal government relocated 32 families from the Dust Bowl to Loma.

A "reading room" was established in Loma in 1936 as part of an effort to provide rural citizens in Mesa County with free public library service. In 1938, the Loma Community Hall was erected, and was used for community meetings and social events. The hall was added to the National Register of Historic Places in 1995.

A uranium mine and mill were built near Loma in the 1940s. Small settlements such as Loma with uranium mines were called "yellowcake towns" because the uranium oxide they produced resembled cake mix.

In the 1950s, a pipeline was constructed along an abandoned Uintah Railway track to carry a mixture of crushed gilsonite ore and water from Bonanza, Utah, to Loma. The American Gilsonite Company owned the slurry line and built a plant in Loma, where the gilsonite was refined into gasoline, "gilsapave" paving tar, and briquettes used for aluminum refining. The plant was later purchased by Gary Refining.

In July 2015, the Colorado Department of Transportation installed Loma's first signal light at the intersection of Highway 139 and Route 6.

Country Jam is a country music and camping festival in nearby Mack that has taken place since 1992.

== Geography ==
Loma is located in northwestern Mesa County, 18.5 mi (29.8 km) northwest of Grand Junction, the Mesa county seat. U.S. Route 6 passes through the center of town, leading northwest 3.5 miles (5.6 km) to Mack and southeast 5 miles (8 km) to Fruita. Interstate 70 forms the southern edge of the Loma CDP, with access from Exit 15 (Colorado State Highway 139). Highway 139 leads north from Loma over Douglas Pass 71 miles (114 km) to Rangely. The Colorado River flows south of Loma.

Loma has been described as having:

A sense of openness that is created by farmsteads, viable agriculture, farm based businesses, small subdivisions, mixed housing types and lot sizes, single-lane farm roads, and two core villages [Loma and Mack] that are the focal points of the surrounding landscape. The underpinnings of rural character is supported by this self chosen lifestyle of small town values, family, community, independence, responsibility, conservation, entrepreneurship, and a strong work ethic.

The Loma CDP has an area of 10.9 square miles (28 km^{2}), all land.

== Demographics ==
The United States Census Bureau initially defined the Loma CDP for the United States Census 2010.

Loma CDP, Colorado
Year	Pop.	±%
2010	1,293	—
2020	1,314	+1.6%
Source: United States Census Bureau

=== 2020 census ===
As of the 2020 census, Loma had a population of 1,314. The median age was 43.2 years. 22.5% of residents were under the age of 18 and 15.4% of residents were 65 years of age or older. For every 100 females there were 102.2 males, and for every 100 females age 18 and over there were 100.2 males age 18 and over.

0.0% of residents lived in urban areas, while 100.0% lived in rural areas.

There were 486 households in Loma, of which 36.4% had children under the age of 18 living in them. Of all households, 69.3% were married-couple households, 11.3% were households with a male householder and no spouse or partner present, and 15.4% were households with a female householder and no spouse or partner present. About 15.7% of all households were made up of individuals and 6.4% had someone living alone who was 65 years of age or older.

There were 509 housing units, of which 4.5% were vacant. The homeowner vacancy rate was 1.5% and the rental vacancy rate was 15.9%.

Racial composition as of the 2020 census
Race	Number	Percent
White	1,192	90.7%
Black or African American	2	0.2%
American Indian and Alaska Native	19	1.4%
Asian	10	0.8%
Native Hawaiian and Other Pacific Islander	0	0.0%
Some other race	18	1.4%
Two or more races	73	5.6%
Hispanic or Latino (of any race)	66	5.0%

== Economy ==
The current agricultural base of the Loma area consists mainly of small-scale cattle operations, row crop cultivation, and lifestyle agriculture.

== Parks and recreation ==
The Loma Community Park covers about 0.5 acres (0.20 ha) and includes a small playground.

There is significant publicly owned land in and around Loma, managed primarily by the Bureau of Land Management. The Loma Boat Launch State Wildlife Area, located south of Loma, is a popular access point to the Colorado River for recreation activities. The trailhead of the Kokopelli Trail, a 142 mi (229 km) recreation trail, is located southwest of Loma. The trail passes through the 123,430-acre (49,950 ha) McInnis Canyons National Conservation Area south of Loma.

== Education ==
Education is provided by the Mesa County Valley School District 51.

Loma Elementary School is located in Loma. Its mascot is the lion, and school colors are green and white. After elementary school, Loma students attend Fruita Middle School and Fruita Monument High School in Fruita.

== Media ==
KCDC radio station is located in Loma.

== Infrastructure ==
Law Enforcement is provided by the Mesa County Sheriff and the Colorado State Patrol. Fire protection is provided by the Lower Valley Volunteer Fire District, which has a station in Loma.

== Notable people ==
- James Niehues, panoramic illustrator known for his ski area trail maps
- Eunice Parsons, artist

== See also ==
- Grand Junction, CO Metropolitan Statistical Area
