= Lakeview Mining Company =

Uranium reduction plant in Oregon, USA

Coordinates: 42°12′8″N 120°21′9″W

The Lakeview Mining Company was a uranium reduction plant 1.5 miles (2.4 km) north of Lakeview, Lake County, Oregon. The mill began operating in February 1958 and operating until November 1960. The site covered 258 acres (104 ha); 130,000 short tons (120,000 t) of ore were processed, leaving behind large amounts of residual radioactive material. These were moved to an engineered disposal cell in 1986–1988.

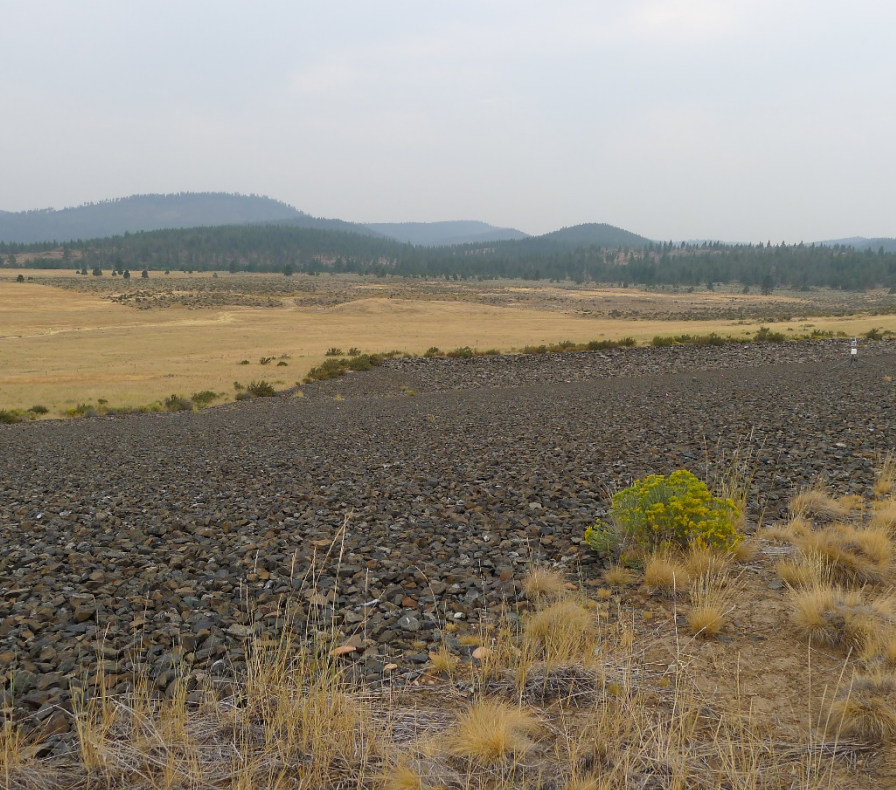
A slope of the engineered disposal cell

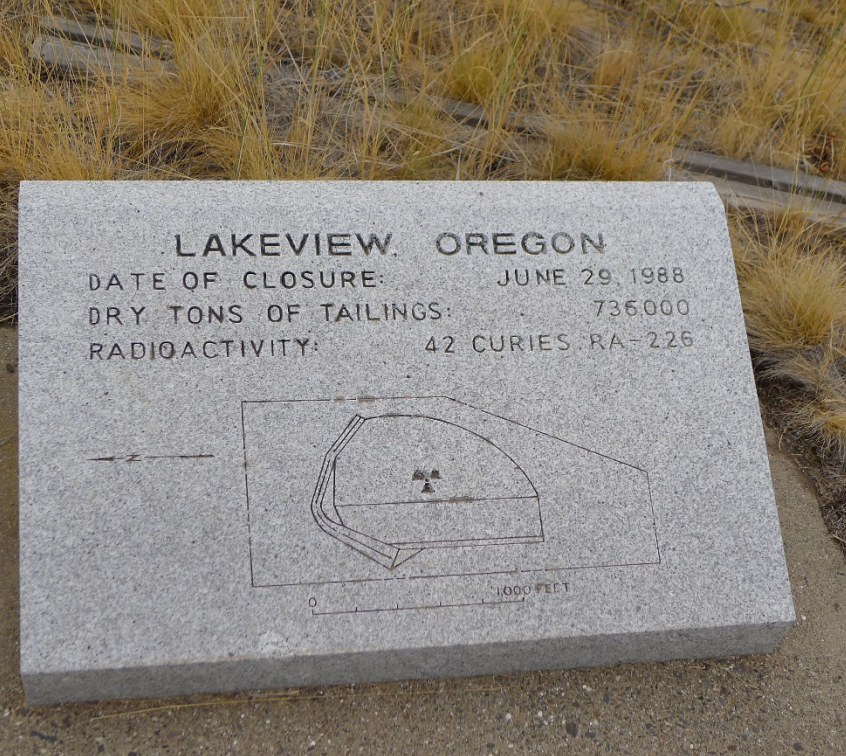
Marker from the disposal cell

The plant was built in 1957–1958 for a cost of approximately $3 million, selling the yellowcake to Atomic Energy Commission. The plant employed approximately 50 workers. Two successful mines were open in the area, Lucky Lass and White King, feeding the Lakeview plant.

Seven raffinate ponds across 69 acres (28 ha) were used for the uranium extraction process, and a 30 acres (12 ha) uranium tailings pile existed. In 1961 Kerr-McGee purchased the site; it changed hands several times and by 1968 was owned by Atlantic Richfield (ARCO), which began radiation remediation. More radiation was found in 1976, leading to an ARCO decontamination in 1977 and then sale in 1978, when a lumber company purchased the mill site and reused the ponds and buildings on the eastern edge as a lumber mill.

The Uranium Mill Tailings Radiation Control Act was passed in 1978, leading to federal control of remediation. Starting in 1986, the US Department of Energy remediated the site, creating an engineered disposal cell approximately 6 miles (9.7 km) away. 926,000 cubic yards (708,000 m^{3}) (726,000 short tons (659,000 t)) were removed from the mill site, creating a 16 acres (6.5 ha) cell. Work was completed in June 1988 at a cost of $24.5 million. The majority of the contamination was from the ponds, not the tailings pile.

The National Renewable Energy Laboratory and EPA visited the site in 2012 for a feasibility study on geothermal heating, as it is adjacent to Hunter's Hot Springs. The report found it to be "economically marginal".

As of 2026, the lumber mill is still in operation, having been purchased by Pacific Pine Products in 1995, producing custom doors with imported lumber for their Lakeview Millworks division. The company is still using some of the original buildings.

A solar power farm was planned on the western 170 acres of the former mine by Origis Energy in 2016. It was completed in 2017 and named OR Solar 6.

== See also ==
- Climax Uranium Mill
- Sequoyah Fuels Corporation
