= Climax Uranium Mill =

Mine facility in Colorado, USA

Coordinates: 39.054629°N 108.554559°W

Climax Uranium Mill is a decommissioned uranium mill near Grand Junction, CO.

The mill, which processed vanadium as well as uranium, was incorporated on May 11, 1950. It was constructed on city-owned property next to the Colorado River which was once the Grand Junction sugar beet mill. Climax Uranium Company gutted the former sugar beet mill, removing any remaining equipment and stabilizing weak walls, and began uranium and vanadium milling operations. The mill soon grew to be 12 buildings large and processed 2 million tons of ore, mostly for the United States Atomic Energy Commission. The mill caused contamination in an aquifer directly beneath the surface of the site. Mill tailings were allowed to be taken for civilian and construction use in the city which led to many vicinity properties with elevated radiation levels. In 1970, the mill was decommissioned and most of the contaminated materials were brought to the Grand Junction Disposal Site. Some of the leftover tailings used in construction led to adverse health effects in civilians around the area and required major clean-up efforts and remediation by the Environmental Protection Agency and International Atomic Energy Agency.

== History ==
=== Beginnings and Manhattan Project involvement ===
After its beginnings as a sugar beet mill in 1899, the 114 acres along the north bank of the Colorado River in Grand Valley were altered in 1950 to become the Climax Uranium Mill, owned by the Climax Uranium Company. The idea for the mill precedes this transformation and begins with the World War II Manhattan Project, a development program for atomic weapons which ran from 1940 to 1945. The US Army Corps Manhattan Engineer District (MED) led the project, and in 1943 began using the Grand Junction area for uranium procurement and the processing of vanadium ore tailings it collected from vanadium mills across western Colorado. In 1946, a private market for nuclear power and weapon development was initiated through the project's transfer from the MED to the Atomic Energy Commission (AEC). Later, the market structure for the federal uranium procurement program was made public, creating a “prospecting and milling industry unsurpassed by any other metal during the 1950s and 1960s.” During this time, the US passed the Atomic Energy Act of 1954, which enabled the AEC's continuing uranium procurement projects and “made no reference to the management of mill tailings, the environmental or health effect of those tailings, or to any requirement for future restoration of processing sites.” It “only concentrated on the production and procurement of uranium, which was seen as necessary to maintain national security.” Tailings were made available for use in construction by private citizens and contractors from 1950 to 1966 before concerns were raised about the possibility of adverse health effects in civilians due to exposure to the tailings.

=== Closure and decommissioning ===
Uranium saw a price drop between 1966 and 1970, shifting from $8 to less than $6 a pound when the AEC ended its price guarantees. The Grand Junction Climax Mill was operative for 19 years and produced 2.2 million tons of radioactive tailings, according to the US Department of Energy. From the early 1950s to 1966, Climax donated approximately 300,000 tons of radioactive uranium tailings from the mill to the city of Grand Junction for use as construction material. The tailings were used in sewer and road construction. Tailings were also made available to private citizens and contractors, who utilized them to make concrete and mortar for their homes and as filler material. The mill was decommissioned in 1970 as a result of the US Department of Energy's Uranium Mill Tailings Remedial Action project. Eight of the 12 main buildings of the Climax Uranium Processing site were demolished between 1970 and 1971 by the Climax Uranium Company. Many vicinity properties were found to have elevated levels of radiation by UMTRA project standards and were deemed to require remedial action to mitigate the possibility of adverse health and environmental impacts. Once granted permission by Congress, the EPA and International Atomic Energy Agency became involved in environmental cleanup through the Grand Junction Remedial Action Program in 1972, with the federal government covering 75% of the project's cost. To continue the process of environmental remediation, the US Department of Energy passed the Uranium Mill Tailings Radiation Control Act (UMTRCA) in 1978 to ensure that disposal occurs in an environmentally sound way and that long-term stabilization is undertaken properly. Demolition of the three remaining buildings of the Climax Uranium Processing site, excluding the sugar beet warehouse which was sold to the private sector, was carried out in 1989. The sugar beet warehouse was sold to a non-governmental party after being properly cleaned and sits on private property to this day. Any equipment that could be decontaminated was sold and anything that couldn't be cleaned was buried in the pile of tailings and rubble at the Cheney Reservoir site (now the Grand Junction Disposal Site) or the Two Road site.

== Environmental impact ==
The environmental impact of the decommissioned uranium mill was largely grouped into two categories, the radioactive tailings remaining in civilian architecture and infrastructure and the contamination of underground aquifers.

=== Tailings ===
Ores procured in West Colorado are majority uranium oxides, and averaged in grade 0.28% uranium and 1.14% vanadium. While the mill removed large amounts of uranium in the ore, radium remained in the tailings. The tailings generated at the Grand Junction Climax Mill produced radon gas, "a radioactive decay product of the radium" left within the tailings. These radioactive tailings were used as construction backfill in nearby residences in sidewalks, sewer lines, and roadways and were hauled to “more than 4,000 private and commercial properties.” It is estimated by the US Department of Energy that there were 300,000 tons of tailings used throughout Grand Junction between 1953 and 1966. Once the expansive spread of the tailings was recognized by the department, a house to house gamma ray survey was completed, the data of which eventually led to the amending of the Atomic Energy Act of 1954: Public Law 92-314. The law gave federal financial assistance to the state of Colorado for remedial action related to tailings and their negative health effects. The amendment led to the initiation of the Grand Junction Remedial Action Program (GJRAP) in the early 1970s, led by the Environmental Protection Agency. In 1986, an Environmental Impact Statement (EIS) was issued regarding the persistent problems at the site and methods and alternatives for remediation. Approximately 6905 properties were found to have a possibility of elevated radiation levels, with 3465 of those falling within UMTRA Project standards for remedial action and making the formal list of vicinity properties. Both the Grand Junction Disposal Site and the Grand Junction Processing Site were designated under Title I of UMTRCA for remediation. The Grand Junction Disposal Site was left open to receive contaminated materials either until it is full or in 2023.

=== Groundwater contamination ===
The Grand Junction Climax Mill site lies above three main hydrogeologic units. There is an unconfined aquifer directly below the site, an underlying shale aquitard within the Cretaceous Dakota Sandstone below the aquifer, and finally a confined aquifer below the shale in the Dakota Sandstone. The groundwater in these hydrogeologic units has elevated levels of both selenium and uranium according to UMTRA standards. Testing of contaminants also revealed concentrations of chloride, iron, manganese, sulfate, and total dissolved solids “above the secondary drinking water standards established in the Safe Drinking Water Act.” The city of Grand Junction does not currently use the groundwater in the aquifer as a water source because “widespread, ambient contamination not due to activities involving residual radioactive materials from a designated processing site exists that cannot be cleaned up using treatment methods reasonably employed in public water systems.” There is currently no remediation strategy in place as the aquifer is considered “limited use groundwater,” meaning it is not presently used as a main source of potable water by the city of Grand Junction.

== Health impact ==
The main risk to public health presented by the tailings is their production of gamma radiation along with radium-226 and radon-222, a decay product of the former one. Outdoors, radon emitted by the tailings is dispersed into the atmosphere. Indoors, radon emitted from tailings used in construction accumulates. Long-term exposure to these products can cause cancer, genetic mutations, and other adverse health effects. These health effects were documented before the decommissioning of the Climax Mill by the AEC and MED programs during research of the atomic bomb. However, when a 1966 study discovered increased amounts of radon-222 in the environment surrounding the Mill, the public was prohibited from accessing leftover tailings. Still, “thousands of nearby “vicinity” properties had already been contaminated.” Further research by Colorado's Mesa County Health Department revealed the county, including Grand Junction, has a higher death rate from lung cancer than the state average, by a margin of 12.9 more people out of every 100,000. The cause for this disparity is undetermined, and the Health Department states that this may be due to either the Mill or a larger smoker population. To gain a better grasp of the scope of environment on which these tailings had impact, the 1980 Census records about 22,650 people living within two miles of the Climax Mill, while Grand Junction, the downtown of which was 13 city blocks from the mill site, was home to 62,670 inhabitants.

== Economic impact ==
Due to the inherent health risk of uranium mill tailings used in construction emitting radon-222 gas on properties, many homeowners suffered a financial hit by not being able to sell their homes after the use of tailings in construction or on their properties was discovered. 4,266 properties were determined to exceed the safety standards for radon emissions and considered to qualify for UMTRA clean-up. UMTRA was a voluntary program, leading to approximately 340 property owners refusing clean-up efforts on their properties. Properties that were uninhabited or well-ventilated to prevent radon accumulation were left untouched. In December 1991, it was estimated that the cost of removing the tailings and transporting them by truck to the Grand Junction Disposal Site would reach a total of $420 million, with $200 million for cleaning up the mill site and $220 million for cleaning up the vicinity properties. The Grand Junction Disposal Site is currently projected to stop accepting tailings in 2023, which would lead to an economic hit for the area. Due to the cost of safely cleaning up and transporting the tailings, it would cost the city over $2 million to transport a couple of years worth of tailings to the closest disposal site, Clive, after the Grand Junction Disposal Site closes. The current remediation cost per ton of tailings in the Grand Junction, CO area is approximately $120.

== Site restoration ==
In 2008, the city of Grand Junction opened the mill site to be developed into a municipal park. The park was named Las Colonias Park in tribute to the early Latino communities that lived on the property before the mill was constructed. Las Colonias Park currently features bike trails, a large dog park, picnic shelters and tables, grills, a playground and skatepark, public restrooms, and a large outdoor amphitheater. It also has water access for fishing and a boat ramp, as well as a beach and wading areas. The Nuclear Regulatory Commission published a Remedial Action Plan for the site in 1994, and the removal of 4.5 million cubic yards of contaminated materials from the site to a disposal cell approximately 18 miles southeast of Grand junction was completed that spring. Reseeding and wetlands establishment was completed in August 1994.

=== Disposal cell design ===
The disposal cell is 2,400 by 1,800 feet, spanning 94 acres and containing 4.4 million cubic yards of tailings and site-building materials. It is about 70 feet deep from its lowest to its highest point. The cover for the cell is designed to isolate and contain contaminated materials through a multipart system. It is constructed of an 18-inch thick transition barrier directly over the tailings, then a 24-inch thick low-permeability radon barrier, a 24-inch thick frost protection layer, a 6-inch thick bedding layer, and capped off with a 12-inch thick riprap layer. The location for the cell was chosen because it lacks significant groundwater sources nearby and has a 700-foot thick sequence of impermeable Mancos Shale below it.

== See also ==
- Uranium
- Grand Junction, CO
- Vanadium
- United States Atomic Energy Commission
- Manhattan Project
- Atomic Energy Commission
- Atomic Energy Act of 1954
- US Department of Energy
- Uranium Mill Tailings Remedial Action
- Environmental Protection Agency (EPA)
- International Atomic Energy Agency
- Uranium Mill Tailings Radiation Control Act
- Uranium Tailings
- Environmental Remediation
- Uranium Ore
- Radium
- Tailings
- Environmental Impact Statement
- Safe Drinking Water Act
- Nuclear Regulatory Commission
