= Colorado State Knowledge Bowl Meet =

Colorado State Knowledge Bowl Meet is the state tournament for high school Knowledge Bowl teams in Colorado, United States. It was formerly held at Colorado College in Colorado Springs, before being moved to Greeley in 2023. Teams qualify for the state meet based on performance at regional competition and are grouped by size similar to Colorado High School Activities Association (CHSAA) classification, although teams from all divisions play each other. The first meet was held in 1978 at Fort Lewis College in Durango. The overall champion received the traveling "Governor's Cup" trophy for a year. Teams qualify for state through several regional competitions. The winner of each class from each region qualifies moves on to the state competition.

== Past Results ==
Year	Governor's Cup/Overall	5A	4A	3A	2A	1A	no. of teams
2026	Grand Junction High School	Grand Junction High School	Cheyenne Mountain High School	Alamosa High School	Lake County High School	Pikes Peak Christian	63
2025	Grand Junction High School	Grand Junction High School	Colorado Early Colleges, DCN	Stargate Academy	Caprock	Pikes Peak Christian	60
2024	Grand Junction High School	Fairview High School	Grand Junction High School	Stargate Academy	Colorado Early Colleges, Inverness	Pikes Peak Christian	60
2023	Grand Junction High School	Fairview High School	Grand Junction High School	Stargate Academy	Colorado Early Colleges, Inverness	Caprock	60
2022	Fossil Ridge High School	Fossil Ridge High School	Grand Junction High School	Stargate Academy	The Colorado Springs School	Caprock	51
2021	Results unpublished						
2020	Canceled						
2019	Stargate Academy	Grand Junction High School	Roosevelt High School	Stargate Academy	Rye High School	Ouray High School	60
2018	Grand Junction High School	Grand Junction High School	Roosevelt High School	Stargate Academy	Peyton High School	Ouray High School	
2017	Grand Junction High School	Grand Junction High School	Windsor High School	Liberty Common High School	Colorado Springs School	Ouray High School	
2016	Fossil Ridge High School	Fossil Ridge High School	Palisade High School	Liberty Common High School	Evangelical Christian Academy	Ouray High School	
2015	Grand Junction High School	Grand Junction High School	Palisade High School	Liberty Common High School	Colorado Springs School	Edison High School	
2014	Grand Junction High School	Grand Junction High School	Palisade High School	Estes Park High School	Pikes Peak Christian School		54
2013	Fossil Ridge High School	Grand Junction High School		Alamosa High School		Ouray High School	
2012	Fossil Ridge High School	Fossil Ridge High School		Salida High School	Del Norte High School	Pikes Peak Christian School	
2011	Grand Junction High School	Grand Junction High School		Vanguard School			
2010	Grand Junction High School	Grand Junction High School	Palisade High School		Fountain Valley School		
2009		Grand Junction High School			Fountain Valley School	Sierra Grande School	
2008		Grand Junction High School		University High School	Fountain Valley School		
2007	Grand Junction High School	Grand Junction High School		Salida High School			
2006		Grand Junction High School		University High School			
2005							
2004							
2003							
2002			Pueblo South High School				
2001				Clear Creek High School			
2000							
1999							
1998							
1997							
1996							
1995							
1994							
1993							
1992							
1991							
1990							
1989							
1988					Summit High School		
1987							
1986							
1985							
1984							
1983							
1982							
1981	Green Mountain High School						
1980	Green Mountain High School						
1979	Gunnison High School						
1978	Green Mountain High School						
