= Eunice Parsons =

American modernist artist (1916–2024)

- Born: Eunice Lulu Parsons; August 4, 1916; Loma, Colorado, U.S.
- Died: November 16, 2024 (aged 108); Portland, Oregon, U.S.
- Education: School of the Art Institute of Chicago; Portland Museum Art School
- Known for: Collage
- Movement: Modernism
- Spouse: Allen Jensen (m. 1936; div. 1960)
- Children: 3

Eunice Lulu Parsons (August 4, 1916 – November 16, 2024), also known as Eunice Jensen Parsons, was an American modernist artist known for her collages. Parsons was born in Loma, Colorado, and lived in Portland, Oregon. She studied at the School of the Art Institute of Chicago and the Portland Museum Art School, where she also worked as a teacher for over 20 years.

== Early life and education ==
The daughter of Florence Alta (Weed) Parsons and Brainerd Parsons, Eunice Parsons was born in Loma, Colorado, on August 4, 1916. Her family lived briefly in Montana, but when she was age four, her family moved to Chicago. In 1934 and 1935, she attended children's art classes at the School of the Art Institute of Chicago. She was married to Allen Herbert Jensen from 1936 to 1960, and they lived in Portland, Oregon, raising three children there. From 1950 to 1954, she studied at the Portland Museum Art School. In 1957 she took a bus to New York, Philadelphia, and Washington, D.C., to study abstract expressionism. Her sketchbooks from that trip demonstrate her early inclinations in "color, line, and shading, all developing into a unique and distinctive style".

== Career ==
Parsons joined the faculty of the Portland Museum Art School as a painting instructor, where she was known as a "blunt but brilliant" teacher. She also taught printmaking and composition between 1957 and 1979. Her career has also included teaching classes at Portland State University.

Parsons was a co-founder of the 12x16 gallery in southeast Portland, a cooperative which exhibited artists' work between 2006 and 2017.

She exhibited new collage works, Eunice Parsons, La Centenaire, at the Roll-Up Photo Studio Gallery in Portland to celebrate her centennial year in 2016. At age 100 in 2017, she was the only remaining living artist from the 2004 group exhibition, "Northwest Matriarchs of Modernism", at Marylhurst University's gallery, The Art Gym. That exhibition had also included artists LaVerne Krause, Maude Kerns, Mary Henry, Sally Haley, and Hilda Morris.

== Death ==
Parsons died in Portland on November 16, 2024, at the age of 108.

== Critical reception ==
Called an American master of collage, Parsons uses torn and cut paper, words and phrases to create "striking and evocative collage works." Her work is held in permanent collections at the Hallie Ford Museum of Art, the Jordan Schnitzer Museum of Art at the University of Oregon, Kaiser Permanente, and the Portland Art Museum.

Isaac Peterson at PortlandArt.net called Parsons' collages "painterly", writing that they are "composed with intricate consideration, but occasionally she moves with a speed and daring any skater would admire". Marc Andres of Portland Community College described Parsons' process of creating collage as one of creation and destruction, adding that it is "at once both extremely spontaneous in its generation and equally methodical in its resolution". Blair Saxon Hill compared her artistic style to that of European artists like Kurt Schwitters or Miró.

In a 2005 review, Victoria Blake wrote of Parsons' view that "collage, like life, is an art of imperfection, of the torn edge and the spot of glue". Blake continued that Parsons has "the ability to recognize the chance encounter for what it is: potential in its purist form".

== Exhibitions ==
- Marylhurst University – The Art Gym
- Willamette University, Hallie Ford Museum of Art
- Jordan Schnitzer Museum of Art, Eugene, OR
- Portland Art Museum, Portland, OR
- Smithsonian Institution, Washington, D.C.
- Portland Community College, Helzer Art Gallery, Portland, OR
- Russo Lee Gallery, "Early Northwest Masters: A Survey", Portland, OR

== Awards and honors ==
In 2001, Pacific Northwest College of Art presented an honorary Master of Fine Arts to Parsons, as well as displaying "Eunice Parsons, a Fifty Year Retrospective" at the college's Felman Gallery. In addition, philanthropist Stephen Wiener donated an endowment for student travel scholarships in Parsons' name.

== See also ==
- American modernism
