= Marques Harris =

American football player (born 1981)

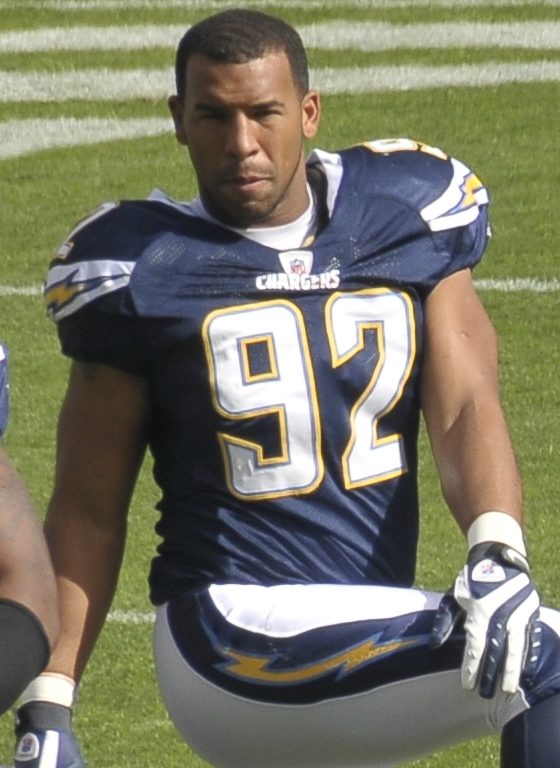
- Harris in November 2008

No. 92, 58, 54
- Position: Linebacker

Personal information
- Born: September 20, 1981 (age 45); Salt Lake City, Utah, U.S.
- Listed height: 6 ft 1 in (1.85 m)
- Listed weight: 245 lb (111 kg)

Career information
- High school: Grand Junction (Grand Junction, Colorado)
- College: Southern Utah
- NFL draft: 2005: undrafted

Career history
- San Diego Chargers (2005–2008); San Francisco 49ers (2009); San Diego Chargers (2009)

Awards and highlights
- First-team All-GWC (2004)

Career NFL statistics
- Games played: 64
- Total tackles: 96
- Sacks: 10
- Forced fumbles: 5
- Fumble recoveries: 4
- Defensive touchdowns: 1
- Stats at Pro Football Reference

Marques Harris (born September 20, 1981) is an American former professional football player who was a linebacker in the National Football League (NFL). He played college football for the Southern Utah Thunderbirds and was signed by the San Diego Chargers an undrafted free agent in 2005.

Harris also played for the San Francisco 49ers.

== Early life ==
Harris played high school football at Grand Junction High School in Grand Junction, Colorado. During his senior year, he was named all-state by Denver Post and Rocky Mountain News. He also was a star wrestler, winning a state title in the 189-pound weight class as a senior.

He also played baseball as a catcher and outfielder.

== College career ==
Harris played college football at the University of Colorado at Boulder and Southern Utah University. He played at Colorado from 2000–2003, totaling 133 tackles, 10 sacks and two interceptions. Before his senior year, he transferred to Southern Utah where he earned third-team All-America by Sports Network and first-team All-Great West Football Conference after recording 68 tackles and 11 sacks.

== Professional career ==
=== San Diego Chargers (first stint) ===
After not getting drafted in the 2005 NFL draft, Harris signed as an undrafted free agent with the San Diego Chargers. He spent most of his career with the Chargers on special teams and as a pass rushing specialist. He is also known for doing a backflip after getting a sack.

=== San Francisco 49ers ===
Harris was signed by the San Francisco 49ers on April 30, 2009. He was waived on October 27.

=== San Diego Chargers (second stint) ===
Harris was re-signed by the Chargers on December 1, 2009.

== Personal life ==
Harris founded a non-profit organization called Athletes for CARE in January 2017. He is a certified life coach and would regularly speak at public events through his organization. He also works as a real-estate agent.
