= KDVC =

KDVC may refer to:

- KDVC (FM), a radio station (98.3 FM) licensed to serve Columbia, Missouri, United States
- KCDC (FM), a radio station (102.5 FM) licensed to serve Loma, Colorado, United States, which held the call sign KDVC from 2007 to 2015
