= Amy Kame =

American basketball player

Personal information
- Born: February 14, 1992 (age 34) Grand Junction, Colorado
- Listed height: 6 ft 0 in (1.83 m)

Career information
- High school: Central (Grand Junction, Colorado)
- College: San Diego (2010–2014)
- WNBA draft: 2014: undrafted
- Playing career: 2014–present
- Position: Guard

Career history
- 2014–2015: Espoo
- 2015: Hobart Chargers
- 2016: Nunawading Spectres
- 2016–2017: Townsville Fire

Career highlights
- 2x All-WCC (2013, 2014)

Amy Kame (born February 14, 1992) is an American professional basketball player for the Townsville Fire in the WNBL.

== Career ==
=== High school ===
Kame played basketball at Central High School in Grand Junction, Colorado. In her senior year, she was named the MaxPreps Colorado Player of the Year for class 5A. The organization stated that, "Kame was the most complete player in the classification, as well as the most consistent throughout the season".

=== College ===
After high school, Kame played college basketball at the University of San Diego for the Toreros in San Diego, California.

=== San Diego statistics ===
Legend
GP	Games played	GS	Games started	MPG	Minutes per game
FG%	Field goal percentage	3P%	3-point field goal percentage	FT%	Free throw percentage
RPG	Rebounds per game	APG	Assists per game	SPG	Steals per game
BPG	Blocks per game	PPG	Points per game	**Bold**	Career high

Year	Team	GP	Points	FG%	3P%	FT%	RPG	APG	SPG	BPG	PPG
2010–11	San Diego	22	82	42.5%	16.7%	56.5%	2.6	0.9	0.4	0.1	3.7
2011–12	San Diego	**33**	375	41.5%	14.3%	**84.2%**	5.2	1.9	1.8	0.5	11.4
2012–13	San Diego	32	516	40.2%	**36.8%**	68.7%	4.4	3.7	**2.4**	**0.8**	**16.1**
2013–14	San Diego	**33**	**573**	**44.5%**	29.3%	73.5%	**5.9**	**3.8**	2.2	0.2	17.4
Career		120	1546	42.2%	29.3%	73.0%	4.7	2.7	1.8	0.4	12.9

=== Australia ===
After college, Kame began her professional career in Finland, in the Naisten Korisliiga. In 2015, she then travelled to Australia and signed with the Hobart Chargers in the South East Australian Basketball League. She then moved to the Nunawading Spectres for the 2016 season. Kame signed with the Townsville Fire in Australia for the 2016–17 WNBL season, the two-time defending champions.
