= Colorado State Highway 139 =

State highway in Colorado, United States

State Highway 139
- SH 139 highlighted in red

Route information
- Maintained by CDOT
- Length: 72.065 mi (115.977 km)
- Existed: 1964–present

Major junctions
- South end: I-70 in Loma
- US 6 / US 50 in Loma
- North end: SH 64 in Rangely

Location
- Country: United States
- State: Colorado
- Counties: Mesa, Garfield, Rio Blanco

Highway system
- Colorado State Highway System; Interstate; US; State; Scenic
← SH 136	→ SH 140

State Highway 139 (SH 139) is a 72.065-mile-long (115.977 km) state highway in western Colorado, United States. SH 139's southern terminus is at Interstate 70 (I-70) in Loma, and the northern terminus is at SH 64 in Rangely.

== Route description ==
SH 139 begins in the south at exit 15 of I-70 at Loma roughly fifteen miles west of Grand Junction. Just north of I-70 the road intersects U.S. Route 6/US 50. From there the road proceeds northward through very remote, very sparsely populated land to its northern end at SH 64 at Rangely. There are no significant settlements for the road's entire length. Near its midpoint, the road crosses the Book Cliffs at Douglas Pass at an elevation of 8,268 ft (2,520 m).

== History ==
The route was established in the 1920s, when it began at US 6 in Loma and went north to SH 64. The route was completely deleted in 1954 and reestablished by 1964, where it ended at Douglas Pass. The route was paved from Loma to Douglas Pass in 1972, when the southern terminus was extended to I-70. The route was extended back to SH 64 in 1975.

== Major intersections ==
County	Location	mi	km	Destinations	Notes
Mesa	Loma	0.000	0.000	I-70 – Grand Junction, Utah	Southern terminus; I-70 exit 15.
Mesa	Loma	1.253	2.017	US 6 / US 50 – Fruita	
Garfield	No major junctions				
Rio Blanco	Rangely	72.065	115.977	SH 64 – Rangely, Meeker	Northern terminus
1.000 mi = 1.609 km; 1.000 km = 0.621 mi

== See also ==
- List of state highways in Colorado
