= James Van Pelt =

American science fiction author (born 1954)

- Born: 1954 (age 71–72); Akron, Ohio, U.S.
- Education: Metropolitan State College (BA); University of California, Davis (MA)
- Occupation: Writer
- Writing career
- Period: 1991–present
- Genres: Science fiction, fantasy
- Website: www.jamesvanpelt.com

James Van Pelt (born 1954 in Akron, Ohio) is an American science fiction author who began publishing in the mid-90s. He is also a teacher in the language arts department at Fruita Monument High School in Fruita, Colorado.

== Biography ==
In 1999, Van Pelt was a finalist for the John W. Campbell Award for Best New Writer. "The Last of the O-Forms" (2002), a short story, was a finalist for the Nebula Award. "The Inn at Mount Either," (2005), a short story, was a finalist for the Theodore Sturgeon Award for Best Short Story from 2005. He has also been nominated for the Analog Anlab Reader's Award, the Asimov's Reader's Poll Award, and the Locus Poll Award.

He has had many short stories published, some of which have been re-published in his three short story collections, Strangers and Beggars, The Last of the O-Forms and Other Stories, and The Radio Magician and Other Stories. Strangers and Beggars, the first collection, was recognized as a Best Books for Young Adults by the American Library Association. Several of his stories have been reprinted in various Best of the Year anthologies.

His first novel, Summer of the Apocalypse, was published by Fairwood Press in 2006.

He received his B.A. from Metropolitan State University of Denver in 1978 and later his M.A. from University of California, Davis in 1990. He lives in western Colorado, where he teaches English at Fruita Monument High School and Colorado Mesa University.

== Bibliography ==
=== Novels ===
- Summer of the Apocalypse (Fairwood Press, Oct 2006)
- Pandora's Gun (Fairwood Press, Apr 2015)

=== Short fiction ===
Collections

- Strangers and Beggars (Fairwood Press, July 2002)
- The Last of the O-Forms and Other Stories (Fairwood Press, Aug 2005)
- The Radio Magician and Other Stories (Fairwood Press, May 2009)
- Van Pelt, James (2012). Flying in the heart of the Lafayette Escadrille. Fairwood Press.
- The Best of James van Pelt (Fairwood Press, 2020)
