= Kaiser Permanente Performance Center =

Sports training facility in Hillsboro, Oregon, U.S.

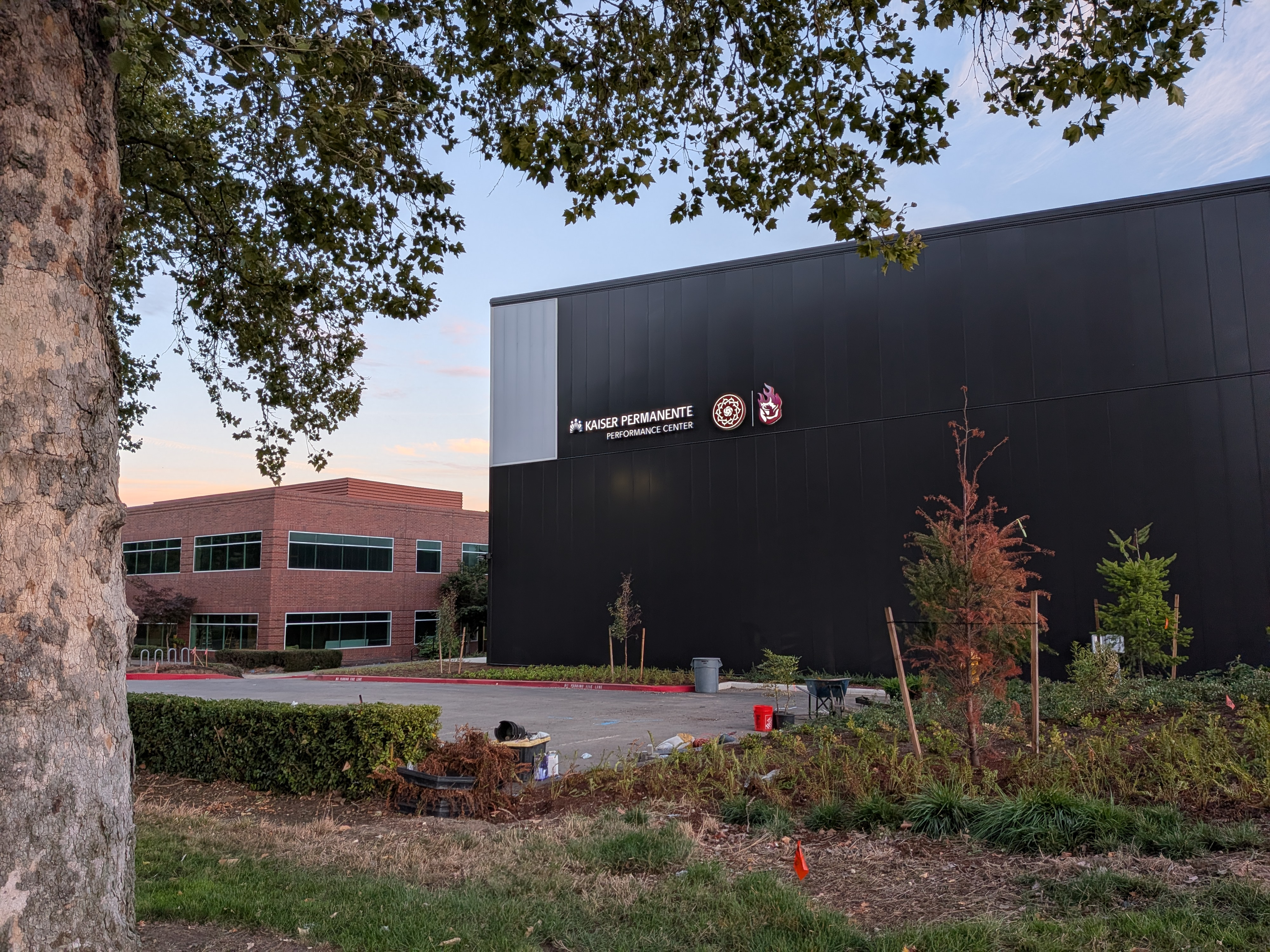
- Team logos on the north facade in 2026

- Location in the United States Location in Oregon
- Interactive map of Kaiser Permanente Performance Center
- Address: 8760 NE Evergreen Parkway
- Location: Hillsboro, Oregon
- Coordinates: 45.545°N 122.889°W
- Operator: RAJ Sports

Construction
- Opened: 2026

Tenants
- Portland Thorns; Portland Fire

The Kaiser Permanente Performance Center is a sports training facility in Hillsboro, Oregon, United States. It is used by the Portland Fire and Portland Thorns FC. Kaiser Permanente is a sponsor and medical provider. Located at the intersection of Evergreen Parkway and Aloclek Drive, the complex is largely the former Evergreen Corporate Center, which Nike leased prior to its corporate campus expansion. The facility is also the headquarters for both teams. It has two soccer pitches, two full-size basketball courts, dressing rooms, conference rooms, work areas, plus space for mothers and families. The $150 million, 63,000-square-foot (5,900 m^{2}) facility was announced in February 2025, and officially opened in August 2026.

== See also ==
- Kaiser Permanente Building, Portland, Oregon
