= Grand Junction High School =

Public school in Colorado, United States

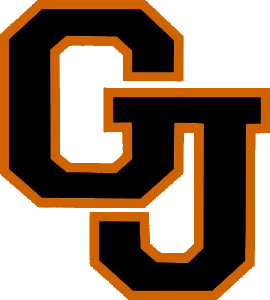

Location
- 1400 North Fifth Street; Grand Junction, Colorado 81501; United States; 39°4′49″N 108°33′47″W

Information
- School type: Public high school
- Established: 1891
- School district: Mesa County Valley 51
- CEEB code: 060695
- NCES School ID: 080435000612
- Principal: Jory Sorensen
- Teaching staff: 91.40 (FTE)
- Grades: 9–12
- Enrollment: 1,832 (2024-2025)
- Student to teacher ratio: 20.04
- Colors: Orange and black
- Athletics conference: CHSAA
- Mascot: Tiger
- Website: gjhs.d51schools.org

Grand Junction High School (GJHS) is a public high school located in Grand Junction, Colorado, United States. It is part of the Mesa County Valley School District 51. It is one of four high schools located within the Grand Valley.

== History ==
Originally founded in 1891, the school has been located at its current site on Fifth St. since 1956. After two years of construction, in 2024 the original school complex was replaced by an entirely new, modern school building on the same property.

As of 2021, the student-teacher ratio was approximately 17:1.

== Athletics ==
Grand Junction's chosen athletic rival is Fruita Monument High School. Some of the sports Grand Junction offers are:

- Baseball (boys')
- Basketball (boys' and girls')
- Cheerleading
- Cross country (boys' and girls')
- Football (boys')
- Golf (boys' and girls')
- Lacrosse (boys' and girls')
- Pom Squad
- Soccer (boys' and girls')
- Softball (girls')
- Swimming (boys' and girls')
- Tennis (boys' and girls')
- Track (boys' and girls')
- Volleyball (girls')
- Wrestling (boys')

== Student publications ==
The school publishes a newspaper, The Orange and Black, as well as a yearbook, The Tiger.

== Notable alumni ==
- Paul Briggs - NFL tackle for the Detroit Lions
- Chuck Cottier - major league baseball player, scout, and coach
- Marques Harris - NFL linebacker for the San Diego Chargers
- Monica Marquez - Chief Justice of the Colorado Supreme Court
- Bill Musgrave - NFL quarterback and coach
- Josh Penry - politician
- Michael Strobl - author and USMC Officer
- Dalton Trumbo - author and Hollywood screenwriter
- Andrew Walter - NFL quarterback for the Oakland Raiders
- Dean Withers - live streamer and political commentator

== See also ==
- List of high schools in Colorado
- List of high schools in Mesa County, Colorado
