= Ben Garland =

American football player (born 1988)

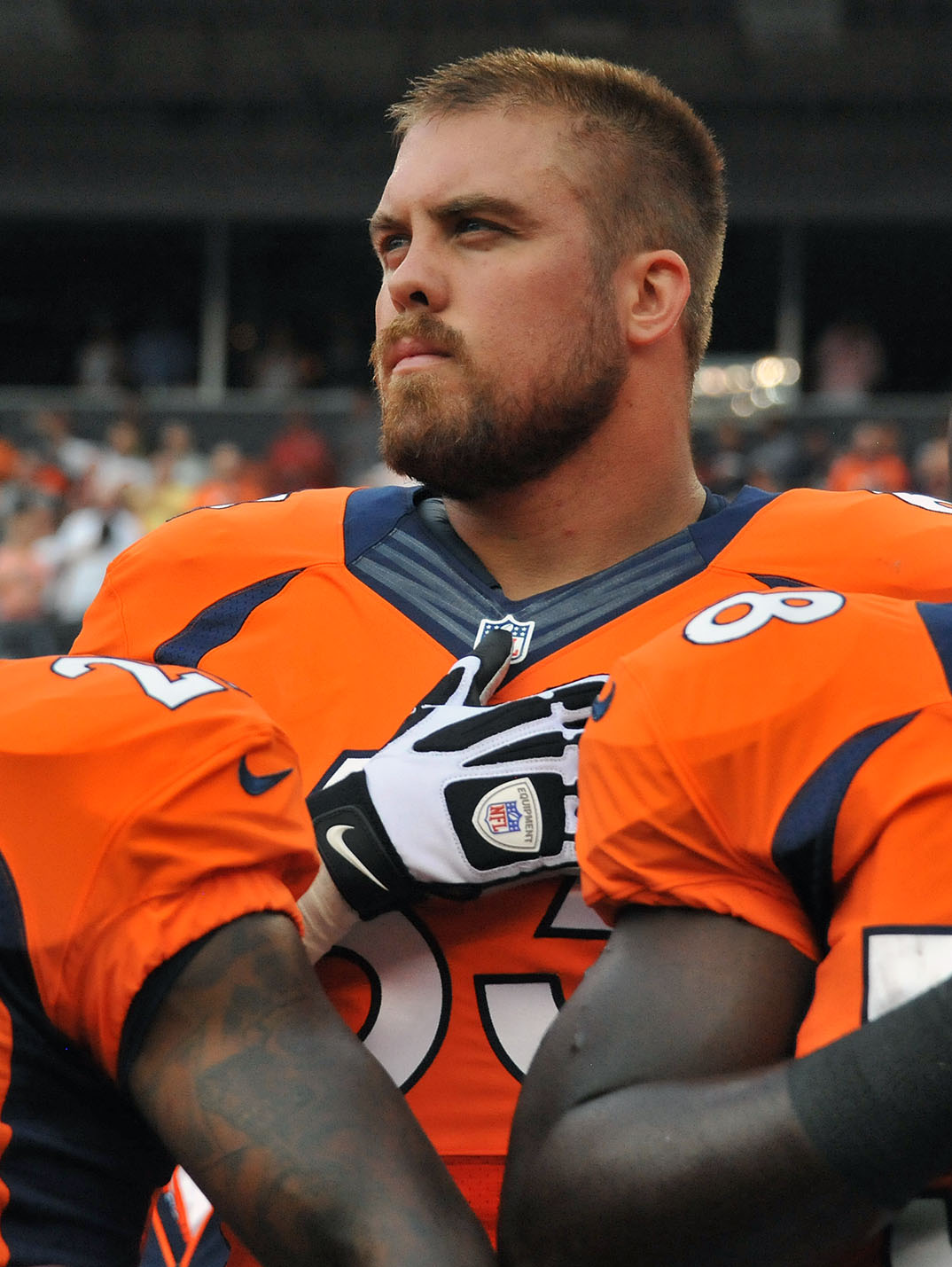
- Garland with the Denver Broncos in 2013

No. 63
- Position: Center

Personal information
- Born: April 6, 1988 (age 38); Grand Junction, Colorado, U.S.
- Listed height: 6 ft 5 in (1.96 m)
- Listed weight: 304 lb (138 kg)

Career information
- High school: Central (Grand Junction)
- College: Air Force (2006–2009)
- NFL draft: 2010: undrafted

Career history
- Denver Broncos (2010–2014); Atlanta Falcons (2015–2018); San Francisco 49ers (2019–2020)

Awards and highlights
- Second-team All-MW (2009)

Career NFL statistics
- Games played: 68
- Games started: 15
- Stats at Pro Football Reference

Benjamin N. Garland (born April 6, 1988) is an American former professional football player who was a center in the National Football League (NFL) for the Denver Broncos, Atlanta Falcons, and San Francisco 49ers. He played college football for the Air Force Falcons. Garland was originally a defensive lineman before converting to an offensive lineman in 2012.

== Early life ==
Garland lettered four years in football and one in basketball for the Central High School Warriors of Grand Junction, Colorado. He earned first-team all-state honors in football as a senior. He was also an all-conference and all-district selection.

== College career ==
Garland attended the United States Air Force Academy and played for the Falcons from 2006 to 2009. He totaled 115 tackles, 11.5 sacks, three forced fumbles, and two blocked kicks in 39 career games, starting 34 of them.

== Professional career ==
Pre-draft measurables
Height	Weight	40-yard dash	10-yard split	20-yard split	20-yard shuttle	Three-cone drill	Vertical jump	Broad jump	Bench press
6 ft 5 1/8 in (1.96 m)	288 lb (131 kg)	5.07 s	1.76 s	2.89 s	4.47 s	7.14 s	35.0 in (0.89 m)	9 ft 4 in (2.84 m)	18 reps
All values from Pro Day

=== Denver Broncos ===
Garland was signed by the Denver Broncos on April 25, 2010, after going undrafted in the 2010 NFL draft. The Broncos placed Garland on the reserve/military list on September 4, 2010, to serve his two-year military commitment. He was released by the Broncos on August 31, 2012. He was signed to the Broncos' practice squad on September 1, 2012.

Garland signed a futures contract on January 15, 2013. He was released by the Broncos on August 30, 2013, and signed to the team's practice squad on September 4, 2013. Garland reached Super Bowl XLVIII with the Broncos, but the team lost 43–8 to the Seattle Seahawks. Garland signed a futures deal with the Broncos on February 4, 2014. He made his NFL debut on November 9, 2014, against the Oakland Raiders. He was released by the Broncos on September 5, 2015.

=== Atlanta Falcons ===
Garland was signed to the Atlanta Falcons' practice squad on September 9, 2015. On December 15, 2015, he was signed to the active roster. On January 14, 2017, Garland lined up at defensive tackle and recorded his first career safety after downing Russell Wilson during the NFC Divisional Playoff against the Seattle Seahawks.

The following week, Garland and the Falcons reached Super Bowl LI after winning the NFC Championship. Against the New England Patriots in Super Bowl LI, the Falcons lost 34–28 in overtime.

In 2017, Garland played in all 16 games, starting three at left guard in place of the injured Andy Levitre.

On March 12, 2018, the Falcons placed a second-round restricted free agent tender on Garland. He played in 14 games in 2018, starting four at right guard.

=== San Francisco 49ers ===
On April 23, 2019, Garland signed with the San Francisco 49ers. Garland was moved to center in week 15 following an injury to starting center Weston Richburg. Garland helped the 49ers reach Super Bowl LIV, but they lost 31–20 to the Kansas City Chiefs.

On March 30, 2020, Garland re-signed with the 49ers. He started five games at center before being placed on injured reserve on October 20, 2020, with a calf strain.

== Military career ==
=== U.S. Air Force ===
Garland was stationed at Scott Air Force Base as a Public Affairs Officer from 2010 to 2012 while assigned to the Denver Broncos Military Reserve players list. Garland held the rank of second lieutenant during this time.

=== Colorado Air National Guard ===
Garland was approved for his separation from active duty in May 2012 and joined the Colorado Air National Guard as a Public Affairs Officer with the 140th Wing stationed at Buckley Air Force Base in Aurora, Colorado. He is currently a Major and fulfills his military obligations between NFL seasons.

== Personal life ==
Garland is a Christian. Garland is a supporter of Waterboys, a charity that tries to provide clean, accessible drinking water to communities in need around the world.
