= Grand Junction, Colorado =

County seat of Mesa County, Colorado, US

- Home rule municipality
- Grand Junction skyline
- Nicknames: Colorado Wine Country, River City
- Location of Grand Junction in Mesa County, Colorado
- Coordinates: 39°05′16″N 108°34′05″W
- Country: United States
- State: Colorado
- County: Mesa
- Incorporated: July 22, 1882
- Named for: Confluence of the Grand and Gunnison rivers

Government
  - Type: Council-Manager
  - Mayor: Laurel Lutz
  - City Manager: Mike Bennett

Area
  - Total: 40.077 sq mi (103.799 km^{2})
  - Land: 39.634 sq mi (102.652 km^{2})
  - Water: 0.443 sq mi (1.147 km^{2})
- Elevation: 4,646 ft (1,416 m)

Population (2020)
  - Total: 65,560
  - Estimate (2025): 71,827
  - Rank: 17th in Colorado
  - Density: 1,654/sq mi (639/km^{2})
- Time zone: UTC−07:00 (MST)
  - Summer (DST): UTC−06:00 (MDT)
- ZIP Codes: 81501–81507
- Area codes: 970/748
- FIPS code: 08-31660
- GNIS feature ID: 2410631
- Website: www.gjcity.org

Grand Junction is a home rule municipality that is the county seat of and the largest city in Mesa County, Colorado, United States. Grand Junction's population was 65,560 at the 2020 United States census, making it the most populous city in western Colorado and the 17th most populous Colorado municipality overall.

As western Colorado's largest city, Grand Junction is the economic and cultural center of the Western Slope region. The city is a transportation hub, situated at the convergence of Interstate 70, U.S. Highway 50 and U.S. Highway 6. Grand Junction is also home to Colorado Mesa University, enrolling nearly 10,000 students annually.

The city is the anchor of the Grand Junction metropolitan area, home to over 162,000 residents as of 2025. It is located in the heart of the Grand Valley, a large Colorado River valley stretching over 30 miles (48 km) east-to-west and 5 miles (8.0 km) north-to-south. Grand Junction comprises the largest urban center between Denver and Salt Lake City, as well as the most densely populated area and the only metropolitan area in Colorado outside of the Front Range Urban Corridor.

== Description ==
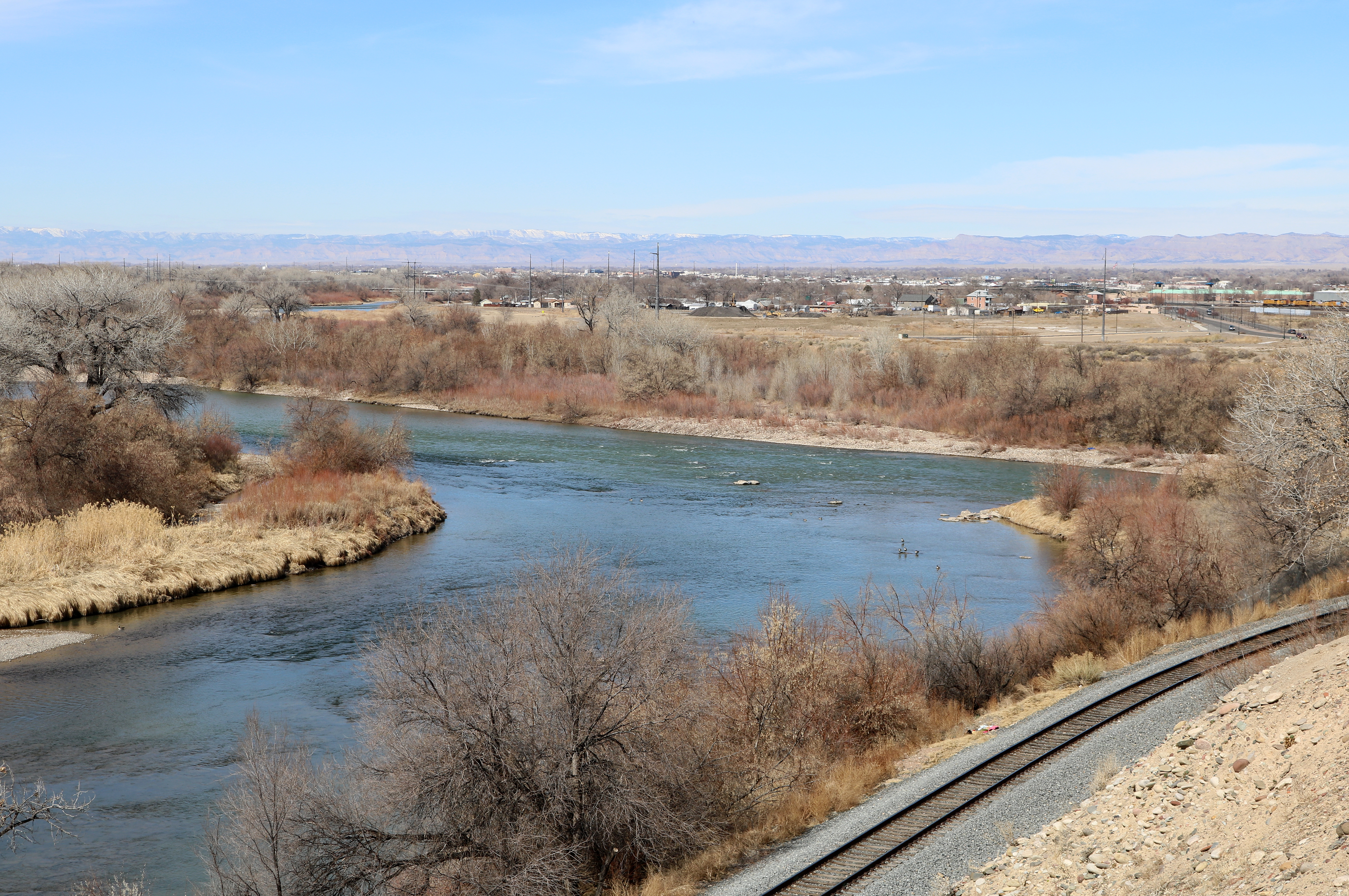
The junction of the Gunnison River (foreground) and Colorado River, historically known as the Grand River

Grand Junction is 247 miles (398 km) west-southwest of the Colorado State Capitol in Denver. The city has a council–manager form of government. It is a major commercial and transportation hub within the large area between the Green River and the Continental Divide, and the largest city in Colorado outside of the Front Range Corridor.

The city is along the Colorado River, at its confluence with the Gunnison River, which comes in from the south. "Grand" refers to the historical Grand River, renamed the Upper Colorado River in 1921. "Junction" refers to the confluence of the Colorado and Gunnison rivers. Grand Junction has been nicknamed "River City". It is near the midpoint of a 30-mile (48 km) arcing valley, known as the Grand Valley; since the late 19th century it has been a major fruit-growing region. The valley was long occupied by the Ute people and earlier indigenous cultures. It was not settled by European-American farmers until the 1880s. Since the late 20th century, several wineries have been established in the area.

The Colorado National Monument, a unique series of canyons and mesas, overlooks the city on the west. Most of the area is surrounded by federal public lands managed by the US Bureau of Land Management. Interstate 70 connects the city eastward to Glenwood Springs and Denver and westward to Green River, Utah; Salt Lake City is reached to the west via Interstate 70 and U.S Route 6, and Las Vegas via Interstate 70 and Interstate 15.

== History ==
In September 1881, the former Ute Indian Territory was abolished and the Utes were forced into a reservation so that the U.S. government could open the area to settlers. Clinton County, Pennsylvania-born George Addison Crawford (1827–91) soon purchased a plot of land. On July 22, 1882, he incorporated the town of Grand Junction and planted Colorado's first vineyard near Palisade, Colorado, causing the area to become known as the Colorado Wine Country.

Grand Junction also has a storied past with gunfighters, miners, and early settlers of the American Southwest. Prior to its incorporation as the city of Grand Junction, the community was known as Ute, and was also briefly called West Denver.

The narrow gauge Denver and Rio Grande Railroad reached Grand Junction from the southeast, from Pueblo via Gunnison in 1882, followed in 1890 by the standard gauge Rio Grande Junction Railway from the northeast, from New Castle (jointly owned by the D&RG and the Colorado Midland). These greatly contributed to the expansion and settlement of the area.

For a time Grand Junction used an unusual system for its elections. From 1909 to 1921 the city used what was called the Grand Junction system, a ranked ballot system invented by Grand Junction resident James W. Bucklin, the author of the 1911 book The Grand Junction Plan of City Government and Its Results.

== Geography ==
At the 2020 United States census, the city had a total area of 25,649 acres (103.799 km^{2}) (40.077 sq mi), including 283 acres (1.147 km^{2}) (.443 sq mi) of water.

== Climate ==
Grand Junction has a cold semi-arid climate (Köppen: BSk). It sits in a large area of high desert lands in Western Colorado. Winters are cold and dry, with a January mean temperature of 27.4 °F (−2.6 °C). Due to its location west of the Rockies, Grand Junction does not receive as much influence from the Chinook winds as locations in Colorado east of the Front Range, yet it does receive protection from the Arctic air masses that can settle to the east of the Rockies. This is illustrated by the fact that from December to February, highs reach 50 °F (10 °C) only 18 days. Lows drop to 0 °F (−17.8 °C) or below on 2.9 nights per year. Snowfall is low compared to much of the rest of the state, averaging 17.6 inches (45 cm) per season; only once in the entire period of record dating to 1893, has observed 10 inches (25 cm) in a calendar day, though the median is 6.3 inches (16.0 cm), and moreover, snow cover is intermittent. Snow is greatest in December and January. Spring warming is gradual but quickens when nearing June; the average last freeze date is April 25. Summer is hot and dry, with a July mean temperature of 78.2 °F (25.7 °C). Grand Junction averages 68 days a year with temperatures at 90 °F (32 °C) or above, and an average 8 days attaining 100 °F (38 °C) or more. Autumn cooling is rapid, with the average first freeze date being October 11. The area receives little precipitation year-round, averaging 9.05 inches (229.9 mm), with no real seasonal spike. Sunshine hours are abundant, even in winter, and total just over 3,200 hours per year, or 73% of the possible total.

Climate data for Grand Junction, Colorado (Grand Junction Regional Airport), 1991–2020 normals, (Note: Mean monthly maxima and minima (i.e. the expected highest and lowest temperature readings at any point during the year or given month) calculated based on data at said location from 1981 to 2010.) extremes 1893–present (Note: Official records for Grand Junction were kept at downtown from January 1893 to December 1899 and at Grand Junction Regional Airport since January 1900. For more information, see ThreadEx.)
Month	Jan	Feb	Mar	Apr	May	Jun	Jul	Aug	Sep	Oct	Nov	Dec	Year
Record high °F (°C)	62 (17)	71 (22)	88 (31)	89 (32)	101 (38)	105 (41)	107 (42)	104 (40)	102 (39)	89 (32)	76 (24)	66 (19)	107 (42)
Mean maximum °F (°C)	49.6 (9.8)	60.0 (15.6)	72.6 (22.6)	81.3 (27.4)	90.9 (32.7)	99.4 (37.4)	102.0 (38.9)	98.6 (37.0)	93.2 (34.0)	82.1 (27.8)	65.3 (18.5)	51.9 (11.1)	102.5 (39.2)
Mean daily maximum °F (°C)	38.1 (3.4)	46.4 (8.0)	58.3 (14.6)	65.8 (18.8)	76.8 (24.9)	89.2 (31.8)	94.5 (34.7)	90.9 (32.7)	81.7 (27.6)	66.9 (19.4)	51.8 (11.0)	38.8 (3.8)	66.6 (19.2)
Daily mean °F (°C)	27.7 (−2.4)	35.3 (1.8)	45.0 (7.2)	51.9 (11.1)	62.0 (16.7)	73.0 (22.8)	79.2 (26.2)	76.3 (24.6)	67.1 (19.5)	53.2 (11.8)	39.6 (4.2)	28.4 (−2.0)	53.2 (11.8)
Mean daily minimum °F (°C)	17.3 (−8.2)	24.1 (−4.4)	31.7 (−0.2)	38.1 (3.4)	47.1 (8.4)	56.8 (13.8)	63.9 (17.7)	61.6 (16.4)	52.5 (11.4)	39.5 (4.2)	27.5 (−2.5)	18.0 (−7.8)	39.8 (4.3)
Mean minimum °F (°C)	3.4 (−15.9)	10.3 (−12.1)	19.3 (−7.1)	25.4 (−3.7)	33.6 (0.9)	44.3 (6.8)	54.3 (12.4)	53.5 (11.9)	39.2 (4.0)	25.4 (−3.7)	13.8 (−10.1)	2.8 (−16.2)	−1.3 (−18.5)
Record low °F (°C)	−23 (−31)	−21 (−29)	5 (−15)	11 (−12)	24 (−4)	34 (1)	44 (7)	43 (6)	28 (−2)	6 (−14)	−4 (−20)	−21 (−29)	−23 (−31)
Average precipitation inches (mm)	0.61 (15)	0.53 (13)	0.80 (20)	0.98 (25)	0.83 (21)	0.41 (10)	0.59 (15)	0.92 (23)	1.19 (30)	0.99 (25)	0.61 (15)	0.60 (15)	9.06 (230)
Average snowfall inches (cm)	4.5 (11)	2.9 (7.4)	1.8 (4.6)	0.9 (2.3)	0.1 (0.25)	0.0 (0.0)	0.0 (0.0)	0.0 (0.0)	0.0 (0.0)	0.4 (1.0)	1.9 (4.8)	5.2 (13)	17.7 (44.35)
Average precipitation days (≥ 0.01 in)	6.3	6.1	6.7	7.1	6.4	3.4	4.8	6.5	6.5	6.2	5.4	6.1	71.6
Average snowy days (≥ 0.1 in)	4.6	3.5	1.7	0.7	0.1	0.0	0.0	0.0	0.0	0.5	2.0	5.0	18.1
Average relative humidity (%)	69.7	60.4	50.1	40.3	36.3	29.4	33.5	36.6	38.8	45.6	58.5	68.0	47.3
Mean monthly sunshine hours	192.3	204.4	240.9	278.0	328.5	359.3	356.2	329.8	292.2	255.1	186.9	180.0	3,203.6
Percentage possible sunshine	63	68	65	70	74	81	79	78	78	74	62	61	72
Source: NOAA (sun 1961–1990)

== Demographics ==
Historical population
Census	Pop.	Note	%±
1890	2,030		—
1900	3,503		72.6%
1910	7,754		121.4%
1920	8,665		11.7%
1930	10,247		18.3%
1940	12,479		21.8%
1950	14,504		16.2%
1960	18,694		28.9%
1970	20,170		7.9%
1980	27,956		38.6%
1990	29,034		3.9%
2000	41,986		44.6%
2010	58,566		39.5%
2020	65,560		11.9%
2024 (est.)	70,554	▲	7.6%
U.S. Decennial Census

Grand Junction is the principal city of the Grand Junction, CO Metropolitan Statistical Area.

=== 2020 census ===
As of the 2020 census, Grand Junction had a population of 65,560. The median age was 39.1 years. 18.8% of residents were under the age of 18 and 20.7% of residents were 65 years of age or older. For every 100 females there were 97.5 males, and for every 100 females age 18 and over there were 95.4 males age 18 and over.

99.6% of residents lived in urban areas, while 0.4% lived in rural areas.

There were 27,584 households in Grand Junction, of which 23.9% had children under the age of 18 living in them. Of all households, 42.3% were married-couple households, 21.3% were households with a male householder and no spouse or partner present, and 29.2% were households with a female householder and no spouse or partner present. About 33.7% of all households were made up of individuals and 15.1% had someone living alone who was 65 years of age or older.

There were 29,431 housing units, of which 6.3% were vacant. The homeowner vacancy rate was 1.7% and the rental vacancy rate was 6.8%.

Racial composition as of the 2020 census
Race	Number	Percent
White	53,209	81.2%
Black or African American	640	1.0%
American Indian and Alaska Native	740	1.1%
Asian	1,049	1.6%
Native Hawaiian and Other Pacific Islander	132	0.2%
Other	3,374	5.1%
Two or more races	6,416	9.8%
Hispanic or Latino (of any race)	10,328	15.8%

=== 2000 census ===
As of the 2000 census, there were 41,986 people, 17,865 households, and 10,540 families residing in the city. The population density was 1,362.6 inhabitants per square mile (526.1/km^{2}). There were 18,784 housing units at an average density of 609.6 per square mile (235.4/km^{2}). The racial makeup of the city was 91.78% White, 0.60% African American, 0.94% Native American, 0.76% Asian, 0.12% Pacific Islander, 3.81% from other races, and 1.99% from two or more races. Hispanic or Latino residents of any race were 10.86% of the population.

There were 17,865 households, out of which 25.5% had children under the age of 18 living with them, 46.1% were married couples living together, 9.4% had a female householder with no husband present, and 41.0% were non-families. Of all households 33.2% were made up of individuals, and 13.8% had one living alone who was 65 years of age or older. The average household size was 2.23 and the average family size was 2.84.

In the city, 21.2% of the population was under the age of 18, 11.9% was from 18 to 24, 26.3% from 25 to 44, 22.8% from 45 to 64, and 17.9% was 65 years of age or older. The median age was 39 years. For every 100 females, there were 95.1 males. For every 100 females age 18 and over, there were 92.6 males.

The population figures are for Grand Junction only; the city abuts smaller towns and unincorporated county areas which contribute to area commerce.

The median income for a household in the city was $33,152, and the median income for a family was $43,851. Males had a median income of $31,685 versus $22,804 for females. The per capita income for the city was $19,692. About 7.5% of families and 11.9% of the population were below the poverty line, including 11.8% of those under age 18 and 9.0% of those age 65 or over.

== Economy ==
=== Economic history ===
From the time settlers arrived in the 1880s until the 1960s, three of the main economic activities in the region were farming, fruit growing, and cattle raising. Fruit orchards, particularly between Grand Junction and Palisade to the east, remain important to the region's reputation and economy to the present day. Fruits most often grown are peaches, pears, apricots, plums, cherries, and, particularly since the 1980s, grapes for wine. In this semi-arid environment, these orchards thrive from a combination of abundant sunshine and irrigation from a system of canals that divert water from the Colorado River.

Attempts were made to establish sugar beet farming and beet sugar production. The Grand Valley Sugar Company established a campaign in 1893, sending three train carloads to the Utah-Idaho Sugar Company. Several tariffs and subsidies to domestic sugar were established in the 1890s, which led to uncertainty in the market. After the 1897 Dingley Act, the company was revived in 1898 and rallied to build a sugar factory. They failed to fundraise to build the plant. At the same time, Charles N. Cox was able to organize an effort to establish a factory in 1898. John F. Campion and others, including James Joseph Brown, Eben Smith, Charles E. Mitchell, George Trimble, James R. McKinnie, and Charles Boettcher invested, creating the Colorado Sugar Manufacturing Company in 1899 and contracting E. H. Dyer to build a factory. After they failed, they sold the plant to local investors, who were able to make it a success. The Campion-Boettcher group then created the Great Western Sugar Company.

Grand Junction was home to the Climax Uranium Mill, a now decommissioned mill that provided uranium ore to the US Atomic Energy Commission. It produced 2.2 million tons of uranium tailings, a by product of uranium mining which can be unsafe. For decades, Grand Junction residents were able to collect as much of the fine radioactive gray sand as they wanted for free. It was used as construction material all over town.

Education and healthcare have been important to the economy of the area, especially since the 1950s, with the rise of Colorado Mesa University and St. Mary's Hospital as leading employers in these fields.

Vast oil shale reserves were known to exist near Parachute, Colorado, in the Piceance Basin. The oil embargoes of the 1970s and high gas prices resulted in major financial interest in the region. Exxon purchased rights and used Grand Junction as its seat of operations. The city and the surrounding Grand Valley became prosperous in the 1970s and early 1980s largely because of the effects of oil shale development. The United States, western Colorado in particular, has the largest-known concentration of oil shale in the world (according to the Bureau of Land Management) and holds an estimated 800 gigabarrels of recoverable oil, enough to meet U.S. demand for oil at current levels for 110 years. Known as the "Rock That Burns", the shale can be mined and processed to produce oil. In the past, it was significantly more expensive than conventional oil. Sustained prices above $95 per barrel, however, may make extraction economically attractive in the coming years (see Oil shale economics). ExxonMobil pulled out of the region because of lower oil prices, which led to economic hardship in the region.

The economic bust, known as "Black Sunday" (May 2, 1982) to the locals, started with a phone call from the president of Exxon to Governor Richard Douglas Lamm, stating that Exxon would cut its losses while retaining mining rights to the (then and currently) uneconomic oil. The economic bust was felt statewide, as Exxon had invested more than US$5 billion in the state. Colorado historian Tom Noel observed, "I think that was a definite turning point, and it was a reminder that we were a boom-and-bust state ... There were parallels to the silver crash of 1893."

By 2008, the economy of Grand Junction appeared to be more diverse and stable than it had been in previous decades. Major contributors to the economy were health care, tourism, agriculture, livestock, and energy mining (gas and oil). Major energy companies had once again invested large amounts of money due to increases in oil and natural gas prices (such as in the years 2005–2008). However, a major drop (in the summer of 2008) of market natural gas prices led to reduced gas well drilling and related capital expenditures in the area, significantly slowing the Grand Junction economy in 2009. Reports given in 2009 suggested that Grand Junction had once again been hard-hit economically, with one report by April 2010 listing the area as having had the largest percentage drop in employment of any "small city" in the entire United States.

By 2008, Grand Junction was being discovered by the "nation's elite business and leisure travelers" as a destination for private jet travel, with nearby Powderhorn Resort and other ski resorts proving major attractions.

=== Top employers ===
According to the city's 2025 Annual Comprehensive Financial Report, Grand Junction's top employers are:

#	Employer	Number of employees
1	Mesa County Valley School District 51	3,397
2	St. Mary's Regional Hospital	3,007
3	Community Hospital	1,403
4	Mesa County	1,250
5	Colorado Mesa University	1,206
6	City of Grand Junction	1,156
7	Grand Junction VA Medical Center	1,001
8	Family West Health	630
9	West Star Aviation	584
10	Hilltop Community Resources	495

== Sports ==
Grand Junction's Colorado National Monument was home to a stage in the Coors Classic bicycle race known as "The Tour of the Moon" due to the Monument's unique landscape.

Since 1958, the JUCO World Series has been played at Suplizio Field. The city is also home to a Minor League Baseball team, the Grand Junction Razorback Suckers, who play in the Pecos League. Until 2026, Grand Junction was home to the Grand Junction Jackalopes, who played in the Pioneer League. The Jackalopes were formerly known as the Grand Junction Rockies, playing as a minor-league affiliate of the Colorado Rockies until becoming independent in 2020. In September 2025, the Jackalopes announced that they would relocate from Grand Junction to a new city.

Grand Junction is also home to a minor league hockey team, the Grand Junction River Hawks. The River Hawks compete in the North American Hockey League, and play their home games at River City Sportsplex in Grand Junction.

Both Suplizio Field and Stocker Stadium also host Colorado Mesa University athletic events, as well as School District 51 sporting events. Stocker Stadium serves as the home football field for the Colorado Mesa Mavericks, as well as Grand Junction High School, Central High School, Fruita Monument High School, and Palisade High School.

== Parks and recreation ==
The Grand Junction area has developed as a mountain biking destination, with many bikers coming from the Front Range of Colorado, the Salt Lake City area, and as far away as California to enjoy the area's abundant single-track trails. Two prominent trails are the Tabeguache and Kokopelli trails, the latter running from near Loma to Moab, Utah. Fruita, Colorado, with its 18-Road trail system, is within 10 miles of the city and has become a major mountain biking destination.

== Education ==
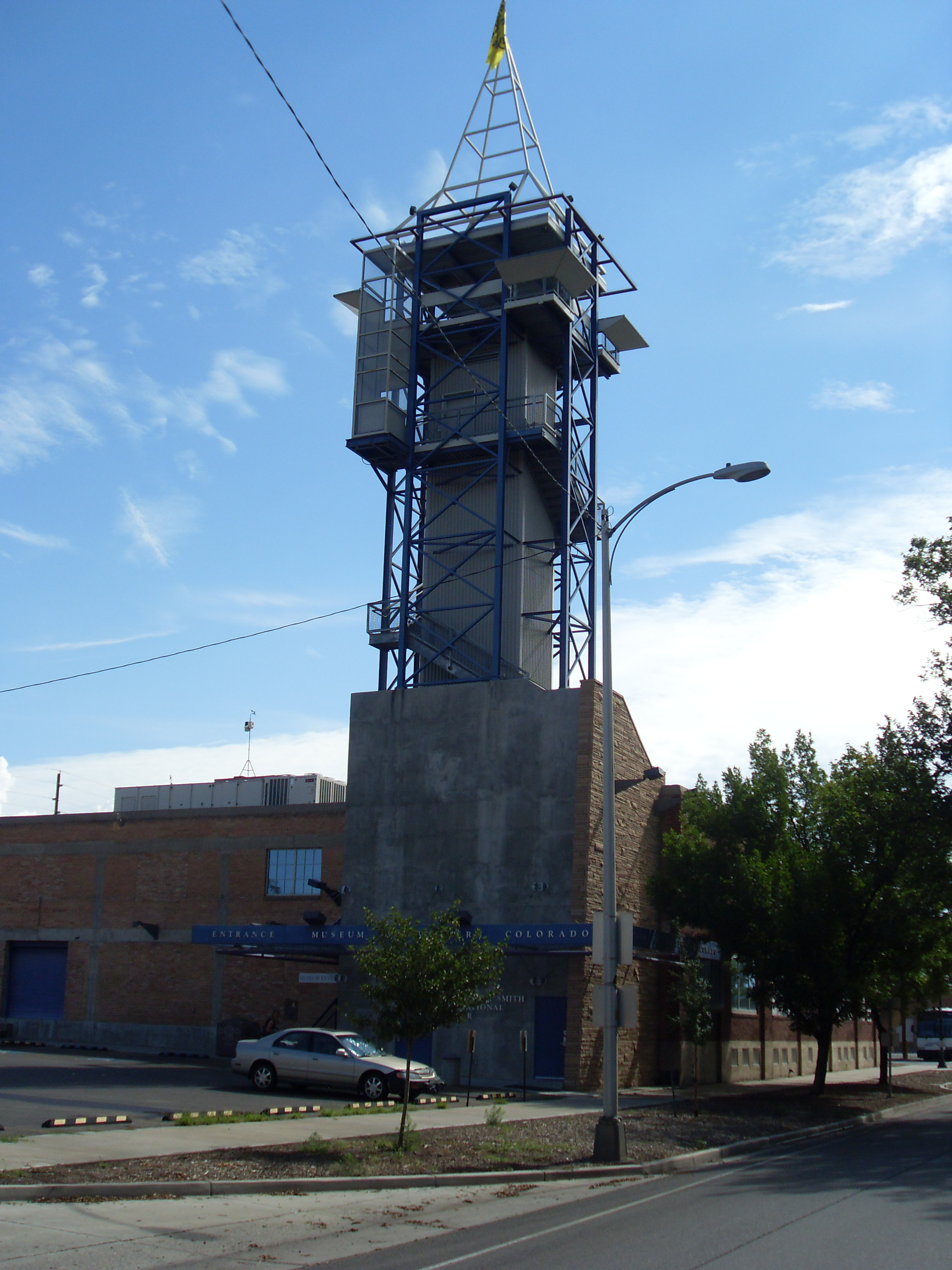
Museum of Western Colorado Sterling T. Smith Educational Tower

=== K–12 ===
The Mesa Valley School District No. 51 provides comprehensive K–12 public education to the Grand Junction area. School District 51 operates five high schools:

- Fruita Monument High School
- Grand Junction High School
- Central High School
- Palisade High School
- R-5 High School

In addition, the district operates numerous middle, elementary, and other types of schools, including East Middle School, Redlands Middle School, and West Middle School. District 51 partners with CMU Tech to operate the Mesa County Career Center, a vocational school owned and operated by Colorado Mesa University. CMU Tech was formerly named Western Colorado Community College.

=== Colleges and universities ===
Grand Junction is home to two higher education institutions:

- Colorado Mesa University, a public university serving nearly 10,000 students. CMU is the largest university in western Colorado.
  - Colorado Mesa University also operates CMU Tech which specializes in vocational education, offering professional certificates and Associate of Applied Science degrees
- IntelliTec College, a private for-profit technical college offering professional and vocational certificates.

== Media ==
=== Radio ===
The Grand Junction radio market includes all of Mesa County, Colorado. Six AM radio stations and more than 25 FM stations are licensed to broadcast from the city.

=== Newspapers ===
Grand Junction is serviced by one local newspaper, the Grand Junction Daily Sentinel. The Grand Junction area also receives newspaper influence from sources in the greater Denver front range area.

=== Television ===
Grand Junction has ABC, NBC, and CBS television station affiliates under the call signs of KJCT-TV (Channel 8), KKCO-TV (Channel 11), and KREX-TV (Channel 5), respectively. Also, Grand Junction has a Fox (Channel 4) affiliate station under the call sign of KFQX that receives news from the Denver FOX affiliate, KDVR (Channel 31) at 9 pm. KLML (Channel 20) broadcasts Cozi TV programming. KRMJ (Channel 18) is the local PBS affiliate, part of the statewide Rocky Mountain PBS network.

== Infrastructure ==
=== Transportation ===
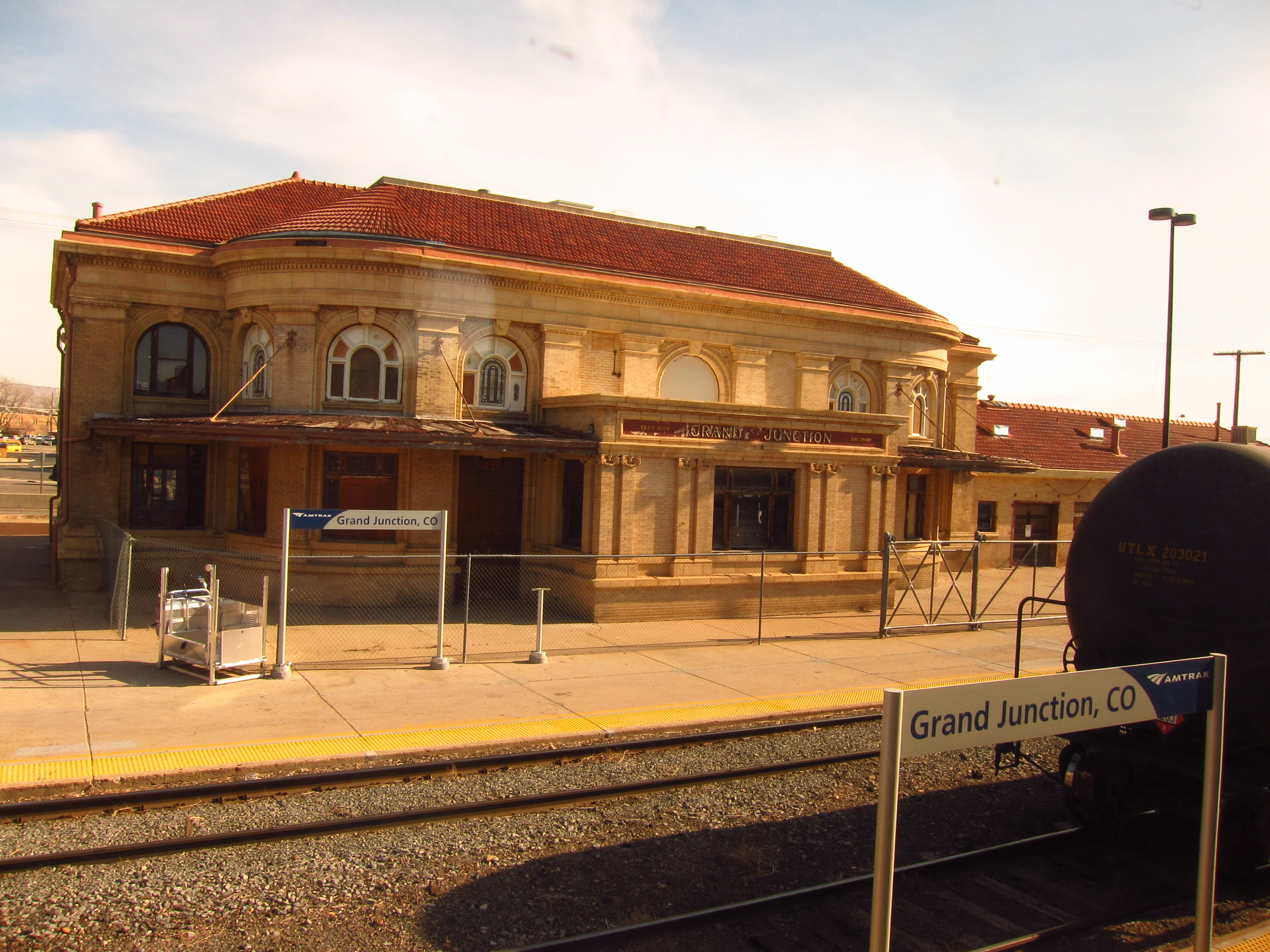
Amtrak station

Grand Junction Regional Airport (formerly Walker Field Airport) is the city's major airport. It is the largest in western Colorado and the third-largest in the state behind Denver International Airport and Colorado Springs Airport. As of 2026, it has non-stop flights to Denver, Dallas–Fort Worth, Las Vegas, Salt Lake City, Phoenix, San Francisco, and Santa Ana, as well as one-stop flights to Hartford, Connecticut, via Las Vegas.

The Central Corridor line of the Union Pacific Railroad goes through Grand Junction. Connecting to Denver and Salt Lake City, it is used by UP and BNSF freight trains as well as the Amtrak California Zephyr, which stops at the Grand Junction Station on its route between Chicago and the San Francisco Bay Area.

The city is served by Bustang, Colorado's state-run intercity bus system, with its West line to Denver and Outrider line to Durango. Local transit is provided by Grand Valley Transit (GVT), which operates 11 bus routes and a "dial-a-ride" service.

The city has a growing network of mixed-use pedestrian and bicycle trails. The riverfront trail system, which runs next to Colorado River, extends from Loma to Palisade, with missing sections between Las Colonias Park and 29 Rd, and 33 1/2 Rd to 36 1/4 Rd. The monument trail provides a connection from the riverfront trail and the downtown core to the Lunch Loops. In 2023, the city council passed the pedestrian and bicycle plan, a visionary document to promote better connectivity. In the same year, the city passed a revised Transportation and Engineering Design Standards (TEDS) to provide clearer guidelines for the development of new bicycle and pedestrian infrastructure. In 2024, the city was awarded a silver designation by the League of American Bicyclists.

==== Major highways ====
- Interstate 70 runs from Interstate 15 in Cove Fort, Utah to Baltimore, Maryland, connecting Grand Junction to Denver, Kansas City, St. Louis, Indianapolis, and Columbus. Via Interstate 15, it connects Grand Junction with Las Vegas, Nevada, and southern California.
- U.S. Highway 6 serves 14 states, running east–west from Provincetown, Massachusetts, to Bishop, California. In Colorado, it generally runs parallel to Interstate 76 and Interstate 70.
- U.S. Highway 50 crosses 12 states, linking Ocean City, Maryland, with Sacramento, California. In Colorado, U.S. 50 connects Grand Junction with Montrose, Gunnison, and Pueblo, and to the west, it travels into the state of Utah.
- SH 340 runs east–west, starting at First Street in downtown Grand Junction, traversing the Redlands and ending at 'U.S. Highway 6 and U.S. Highway 50 in Fruita.

== Notable people ==
- Owen Aspinall, former governor of American Samoa
- Sabré Cook, racing driver
- Ross Davis, racing driver
- Charles L. Fletcher, architect and interior designer
- Ben Garland, NFL player
- Chuck Hull, inventor
- Jeff Hurd, U.S. representative
- Vance Johnson, former NFL wide receiver
- Aryn Kyle, author
- Kathryn Mientka, pianist, director of the Western Slope Chamber Music Series
- Tyme Mientka, cellist, director of the Western Slope Chamber Music Series
- Annabelle Craft Moss, aviator who received Congressional Gold Medal
- Bill Musgrave, former NFL player and coach
- Rick Schroder, actor and film director
- Elmo Smith, former governor of Oregon
- Michael Strobl, U.S. Marine, subject of a 2009 film, Taking Chance
- Dalton Trumbo, screenwriter
- Walter Walker, political leader and publisher
- Dean Withers, live streamer and political commentator

== Sister city ==
Grand Junction has a sister city, as designated by Sister Cities International:

- El Espino (Jucuarán), Usulután Department, El Salvador

== See also ==
- List of municipalities in Colorado
