= James Niehues =

American artist (born 1946)

James Niehues (born c. 1946) is an American landscape artist and cartographer best known for painting ski trail maps for ski resorts. He has painted 255 maps for 175 ski resorts around the world. These maps take him many months to complete and they are all done by himself and by hand.

== Early life ==
Niehues was raised on a farm in Loma, Colorado, and attended Fruita Monument High School. He began painting at the age of 15, when he fell ill with nephritis and his mother gave him an oil painting set to keep him occupied while he was bedridden for three months.

== Career ==
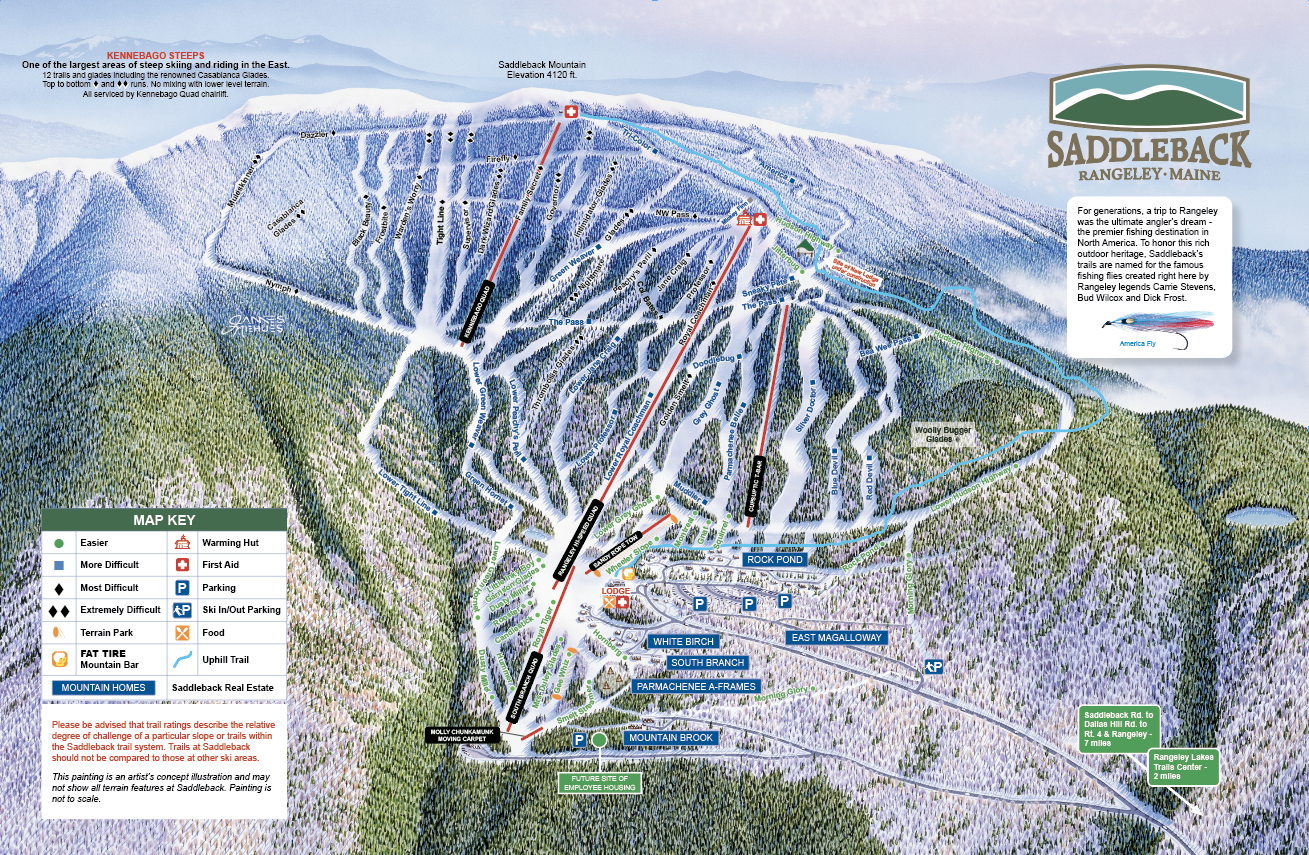
Niehues' map for Saddleback Maine

After serving in the U.S. Army from 1965 to 1969, Niehues worked in advertising, printing and graphic design. In 1987, while working at a Denver print shop, he met Bill Brown, a painter of ski resort maps who was nearing retirement. Brown gave him his first assignment as a map painter: a small inset map commissioned by Winter Park Resort in Colorado. After his map was accepted by Winter Park, Niehues printed copies of his illustration and sent them to the marketing managers of ski resorts across the U.S. to advertise his map-painting services. The first resort to respond was Vail Ski Resort, which hired him to paint a new trail map. The first ski map that he designed and painted by himself was Boreal Mountain Resort in California; as of 2016, Niehues' map was still in use, 29 years after it was created. He retired completely in 2021.

Niehues' method of painting ski trails begins with aerial photographs of the mountain that he either takes himself or obtains from Google Earth. He then sketches the mountain based on the photographs and adds color and detail with watercolor paints and an airbrush.

By 2016, Niehues had painted 255 maps for 175 ski resorts around the world. The largest resorts he has painted for include Aspen, Breckenridge, Crested Butte, Copper Mountain and Winter Park in Colorado, Big Sky Resort in Montana, Boyne Mountain Resort in Michigan, Killington Ski Resort in Vermont, Mount Bachelor in Oregon, Sugarloaf in Maine, and Mont Tremblant Resort and Whistler Blackcomb in Canada. He estimates that he has created trail maps for 75% of the large ski resorts in the U.S. In 2011, his work was displayed in an exhibition at Apexart in New York City. He semi-retired in 2014, and lives in Loveland, Colorado.

Niehues' work has drawn numerous comparisons to famous artists: he has been called "the Michelangelo of snow", "Rembrandt of the ski trail", "Monet of the mountain", and the "Norman Rockwell of ski resorts".

Niehues paints in vellum.
