= KCDC (FM) =

- Loma, Colorado; United States
- Frequency: 102.5 MHz

Programming
- Format: Silent

Ownership
- Owner: Cochise Media Licenses LLC

History
- Former call signs: KDVC (2007–2015)

Technical information
- Licensing authority: FCC
- Facility ID: 164124
- Class: C2
- ERP: 400 watts
- HAAT: 383.0 meters (1,256.6 ft)
- Transmitter coordinates: 39°4′1″N 108°44′39″W

Links
- Public license information: Public file; LMS

KCDC (102.5 FM) is a radio station licensed to Loma, Colorado, United States. The station is owned by Cochise Media Licenses LLC.

== Construction permit ==
On May 21, 2009, the then-KDVC was granted a U.S. Federal Communications Commission construction permit to change the city of license from Dove Creek, Colorado to Loma, Colorado, move to a new transmitter site, decrease ERP to 400 watts and increase HAAT to 383 meters. The license for the new facility was issued on September 6, 2016.
