= Kaiser Permanente Building =

Building in Portland, Oregon, U.S.

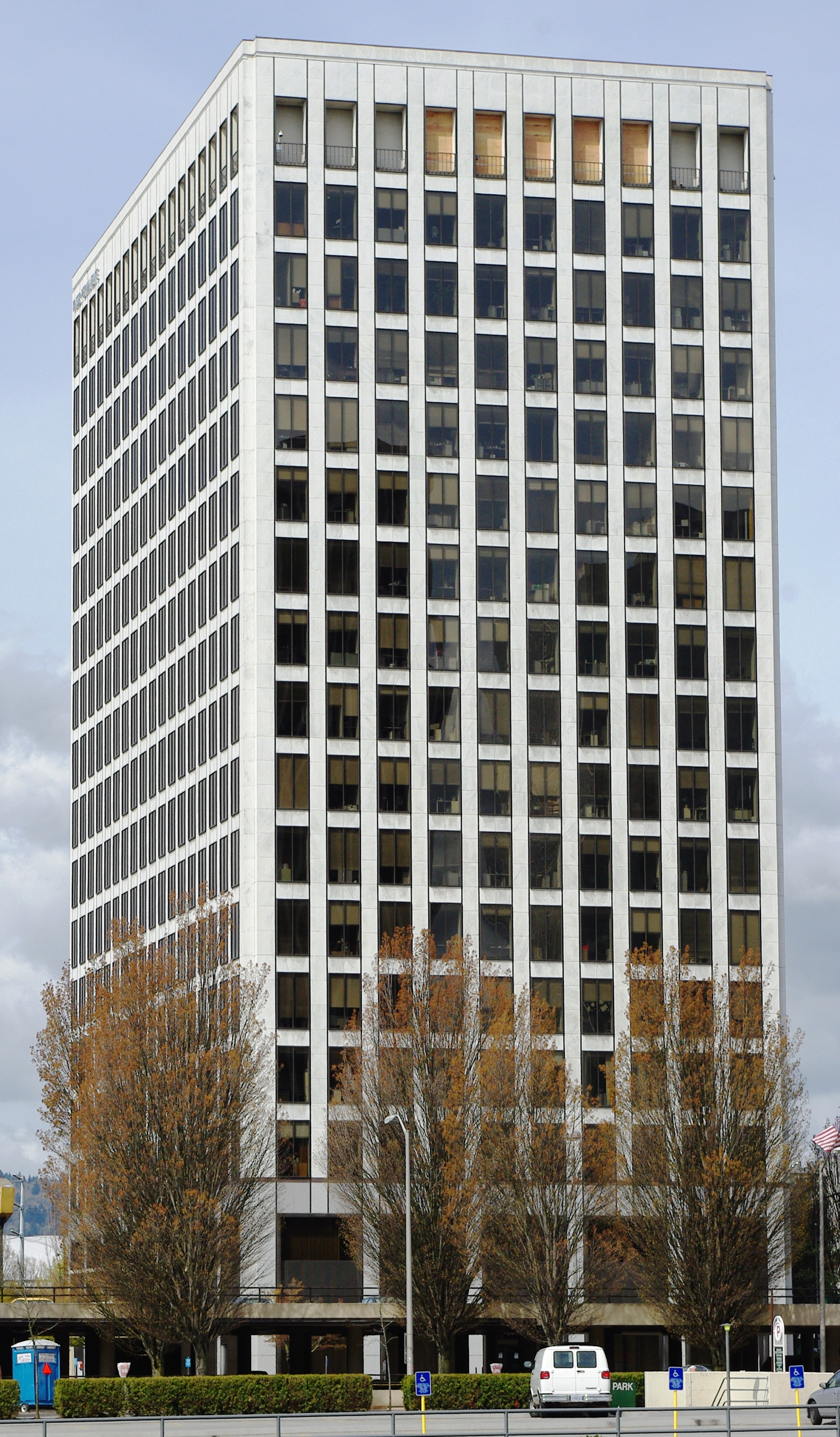
- The building in 2011
- Interactive map of the Kaiser Permanente Building area

General information
- Location: Portland, Oregon, United States
- Coordinates: 45.5311°N 122.6600°W

The Kaiser Permanente Building, also known as the Lloyd 500 Building, is a 16-story building located at 500 Northeast Multnomah Street in Portland, Oregon's Lloyd District, in the United States. Construction began in 1972 and was completed in 1974.

== See also ==
- Kaiser Permanente
- Kaiser Permanente Performance Center, Hillsboro, Oregon
