= Mientka Duo =

American musical duo

The Mientka Duo was a musical act, consisting of husband and wife Tyme (pronounced Tim), a cellist and Kathryn Mientka, a pianist.

The duo formed in 1979 or 1983, performing initially in the United States, and then in Germany for about eight years, before moving back to the U.S. by 1990. They performed classical, Celtic, Broadway standards, Spanish music and American music, to audiences in Germany, France, Italy, Switzerland and the United States. Both Tyme and Kathryn studied at Northwestern University and at the University of Southern California, and earned Master's degrees in music performance.

Their concert at the National Gallery in Washington, D.C. in 1994 was featured on NPR. In 1995, The Mientka Duo, also known as Nova Mientka, was the subject of an Emmy Award nominated documentary on PBS, titled Almost Famous: On Tour With the Mientka Duo.

The Mientka Duo received such awards as a special prize at the Concours International De Musique De Chambre in Paris.

Tyme and Kathryn served as founders and directors of the Western Slope Chamber Music Series in Grand Junction, Colorado. The duo, with Dave Alderdice and Audrey Solomon, were also members of the Colorado-based band Feast. Tyme and two of their three children also played in the Grand Junction Symphony Orchestra.

Tyme Mientka died of cancer on March 31, 2012, aged 55. Kathryn has subsequently performed as a solo pianist.
