= Central High School (Grand Junction, Colorado) =

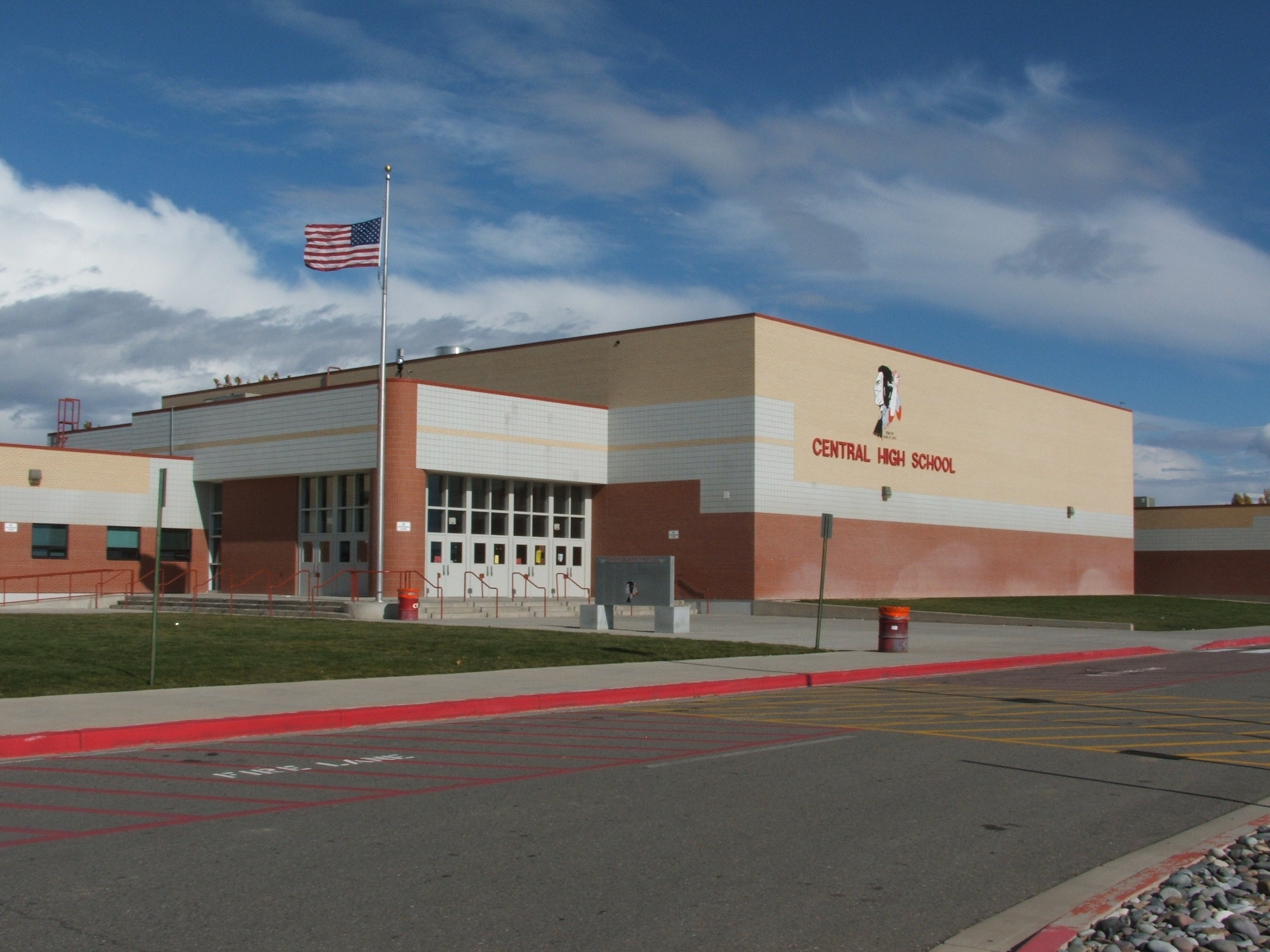
- Central High School in 2006, the sign and mascot have since been changed.

Location
- 550 Warrior Way; Grand Junction, Colorado 81504; United States; 39°5′13″N 108°28′19″W

Information
- School type: Public high school
- Motto: Where Warriors are Made
- School district: Mesa County Valley 51
- CEEB code: 060690
- NCES School ID: 080435000600
- Principal: Zeb Hayward
- Teaching staff: 79.45 (on an FTE basis)
- Grades: 9–12
- Enrollment: 1,443 (2023–2024)
- Student to teacher ratio: 18.16
- Colors: Red, white, gray
- Athletics conference: CHSAA
- Mascot: Warrior
- Website: chs.d51schools.org

Central High School is a public secondary school for grades 9–12 located in Grand Junction, Colorado. Its enrollment is 1,598, and it is operated by Mesa County Valley School District No. 51.

== History ==
Central High School graduated its first class of seniors in 1948. The school was first established and located in an old adobe building at 29 Road and North Avenue, a site formerly occupied by Fruitvale Elementary School and Fruitvale High School. The current CHS building near E Road was first occupied in 1959.

In August 2009, U.S. President Barack Obama led a televised town hall meeting on healthcare reform at Central High School.

== Extracurriculars ==
Central High offers football, baseball, tennis, soccer, and wrestling.

Central publishes a school newspaper titled The Warrior, which highlights school issues, as well as a yearbook.

== Notable alumni ==
- Ben Garland – professional American football player for the Denver Broncos, Atlanta Falcons, and San Francisco 49ers
- Chuck Hull – engineer and inventor; member of the National Inventors Hall of Fame
- Amy Kame – American professional basketball player for the Townsville Fire in the WNBL
- Jimmy Serrano – American professional baseball player

== See also ==
- List of high schools in Colorado
- List of high schools in Mesa County, Colorado
