= Uranium Mill Tailings Remedial Action =

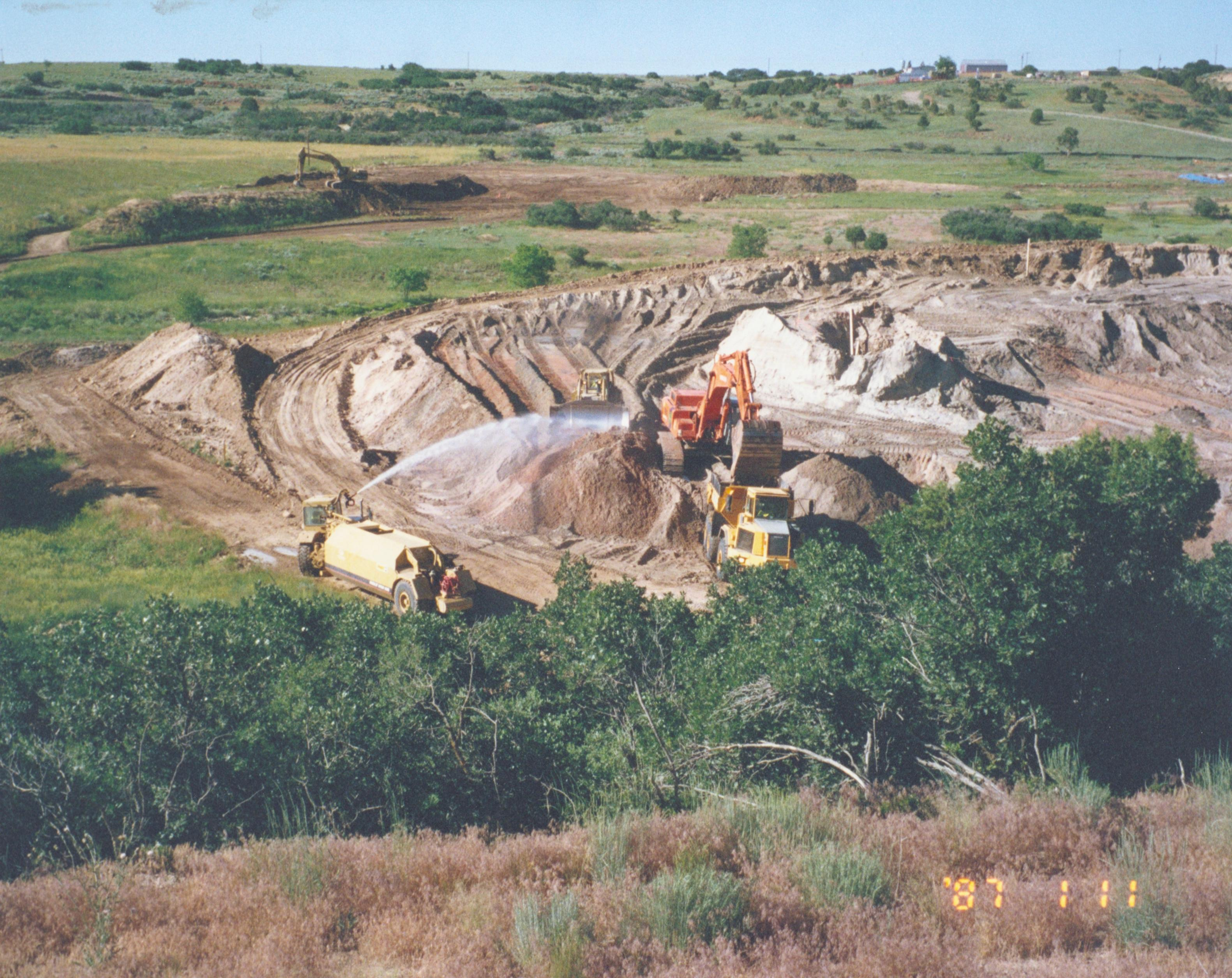
Removal of uranium contamination at an UMTRA Project site

The Uranium Mill Tailings Remedial Action (UMTRA) Project was created by the United States Department of Energy (DOE) to monitor the cleanup of uranium mill tailings, a by-product of the uranium concentration process that poses risks to the public health and environment. The Uranium Mill Tailings Radiation Control Act passed by Congress in 1978 gave the DOE the authority to regulate tailings disposal sites and shifted disposal practices to more engineered designs.

== Background ==
Uranium tailings are the waste material produced from the process of uranium milling which converts mined uranium ore into uranium concentrate, also known as yellowcake uranium. They are initially produced in a slurry material before being deposited in settling ponds and drying into a sand-like material. These tailings make up the large quantity of the uranium originally mined, with only 2.4 pounds of concentrated yellowcake uranium for every 2,000 pounds of uranium ore used in the process.

Uranium milling from 1947 to 1971 largely supported nuclear weapon development and naval reactors, producing 20-35 million pounds of uranium concentrate annually in that period. Production after 1971 supported civilian nuclear power which saw an increase as 59 nuclear reactors came online between 1970 and 1979 but then a decrease to only four million pounds of uranium concentrate in 2000.

=== Public health and environmental effects ===
The aspects associated with tailings disposal have raised several public health and environmental effects four of which have been identified by the US Environmental Protection Agency (EPA). If tailings are used in construction materials, diffusion of radon gas indoors increases the risk of lung cancer as would inhalation or ingestion of small particles emitted into the atmosphere directly from the mill piles. The gamma radiation from radioactive decay in the tailings poses risk to exposure as well. Trace metals and radionuclides can move from tailings into groundwater or surface water following physical or geochemical mechanisms. There the hazards associated with them may persist for hundreds of thousands of years.

== Implementation ==
=== Pre-1978 ===
Federal agencies issued a "Joint Federal Agency Position Regarding Control of Uranium Mill Tailings" in 1966 to urge individual owners of mills to take it upon themselves to plan for the management and stabilization of the mill tailings. The actions stemming from this Joint Statement were without a legally binding regulatory program, and so they were largely unsatisfactory.

=== Post-1978 ===
In 1978 the US Congress passed the Uranium Mill Tailings Radiation Control Act (UMTRCA) which was tasked the DOE with the responsibility of stabilizing, disposing, and controlling uranium mill tailings and other contaminated material at uranium mill processing spread across 10 states and at approximately 5,200 associated properties. Under UMTRCA, the DOE created UMTRA to decommission 24 uranium mills and dispose of their residual mill tailings. These are typically stored in an engineered disposal cell, described in the 1995 40 CFR 192 (60 FR 2854). designed to reduce groundwater contamination, as well as withstanding precipitation and flood events, withstanding "maximum credible earthquakes", and preferably having a design lifespan of 1000 years. The covers are also designed to substantially reduce radon gas emission. The disposal cells are located at the mill site or within 5 miles, if possible.

Title I of UMTRCA addressed the environmental and public health risks at uranium mills operating during the federal uranium procurement period from the mid-1940s to the 1970s. Title I sites are regulated in accordance to regulation 10 CFR 40.27 known as the "General license for custody and long-term care of residual radioactive material disposal sites.". Under these regulations, proper monitoring, maintenance and precautionary measures in the case of an emergency are mandatory for the remediation of Title I sites. Disposal of radioactive material is allocated to various disposal sites approved by the United States Department of Energy. Within these Title I classifications, DOE approved of an action plan which targeted groundwater contamination and allowed for Native American Tribes and the state to discuss future plans to remove contamination from groundwater. Sites who have contained all radioactive and contaminated material will be approved with a Nuclear Regulatory Commission (NRC) General License.

Title II concerned the regulation of licensed uranium mills after the passing of UMTRCA. It contains the mechanism by which land and mill tailings are transferred to the federal government and the way costs concerning long-term management are arranged with licensees. Under these licenses, sites will receive funding towards surveillance and maintenance from DOE as well as the development of Long Term Surveillance Plans (LTSP). After approval, these sites will be taken into the custody of DOE and held in accordance with regulation 10 CFR 40.28 known as the "General License for Custody and Long-Term Care of Uranium or Thorium Byproduct Materials Disposal Sites."

=== Post-1988 ===
UMTRCA was amended in 1988 in response to DOE concerns of ongoing groundwater contamination issues at several sites. The amendment gave the DOE to perform groundwater remediation at these Title I sites indefinitely.

== Impacts ==
UMTRCA has allowed federal law and regulatory agencies authority to regulate tailings and has provided for the replacement of inactive uranium mill tailings piles susceptible to natural dispersal with engineered repositories designed to stabilize tailings for hundreds of years.

In 2021, a yearly review was provided by DOE, which highlighted multiple breakthroughs from the UMTRA project in Moab, Utah. Result from these highlights include a removal of over 12 million tons of radioactive material which have been sent to disposal, diverting about 970,000 pounds of ammonia and over 5,000 pounds of uranium from the Colorado River and disposed of a sizeable amount of building debris from the southern end of the tilling within Moab.

As of 2023, DOE claims that the remedial footprint of these actions have been reduced by 90%, or from 3,300 square miles to 300 square miles. Within the strategic visions published by DOE, there are listed priorities for the next ten years which include the protection of people and the environment, treatment and stabilization of radioactive material and radioactive storages, the further remediation of groundwater and decommissioning "excess facilities".

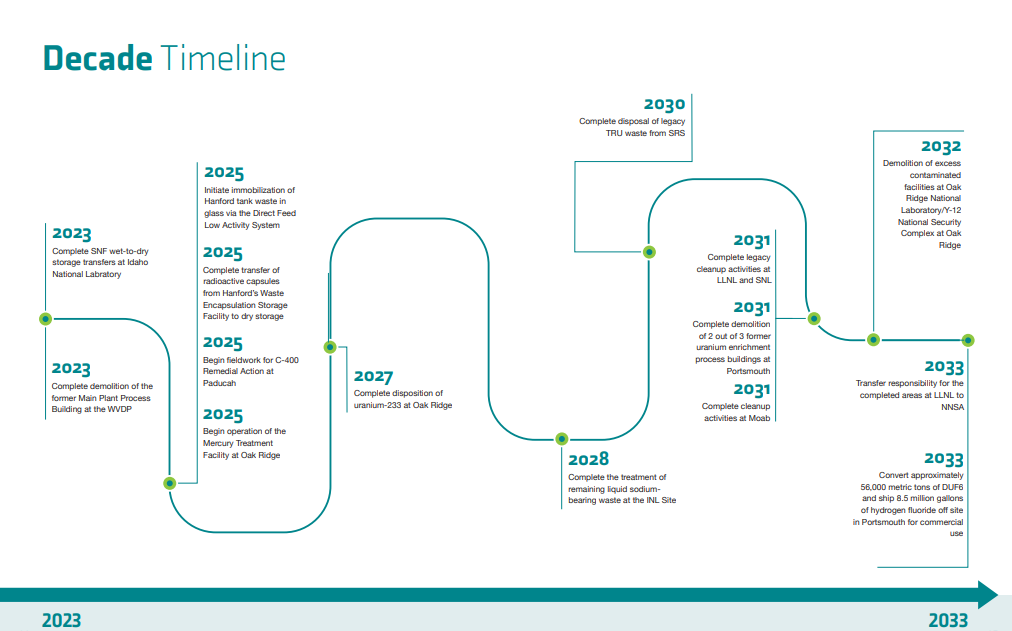
A decade timeline displaying future cleanup actions relating to Uranium Mining Tilling within the years 2023-2033

== Current legislation ==
In 1978, Congress passed Public law 95-604, known as the Uranium Mill Tailings Radiation Control Act (UMTRCA), which attempted to remove uranium from inactive uranium mill sites that have been discontinued since the 1960s. This act does not apply to mills past this era and instead allow the private owners to deal with them in any way they see fit. As a result of this act, the Department of Energy located within Albuquerque, New Mexico created the UMTRCA Project office in an attempt to better carry out these projects. Around 97% of remedial action in all of these areas has been complete with 18 UMTRCA sites around the United States.

== See also ==
- United States energy law
- Uranium mining
- Uranium Mill Tailings Radiation Control Act
