= Douglas Pass =

Mountain pass in western Colorado, USA

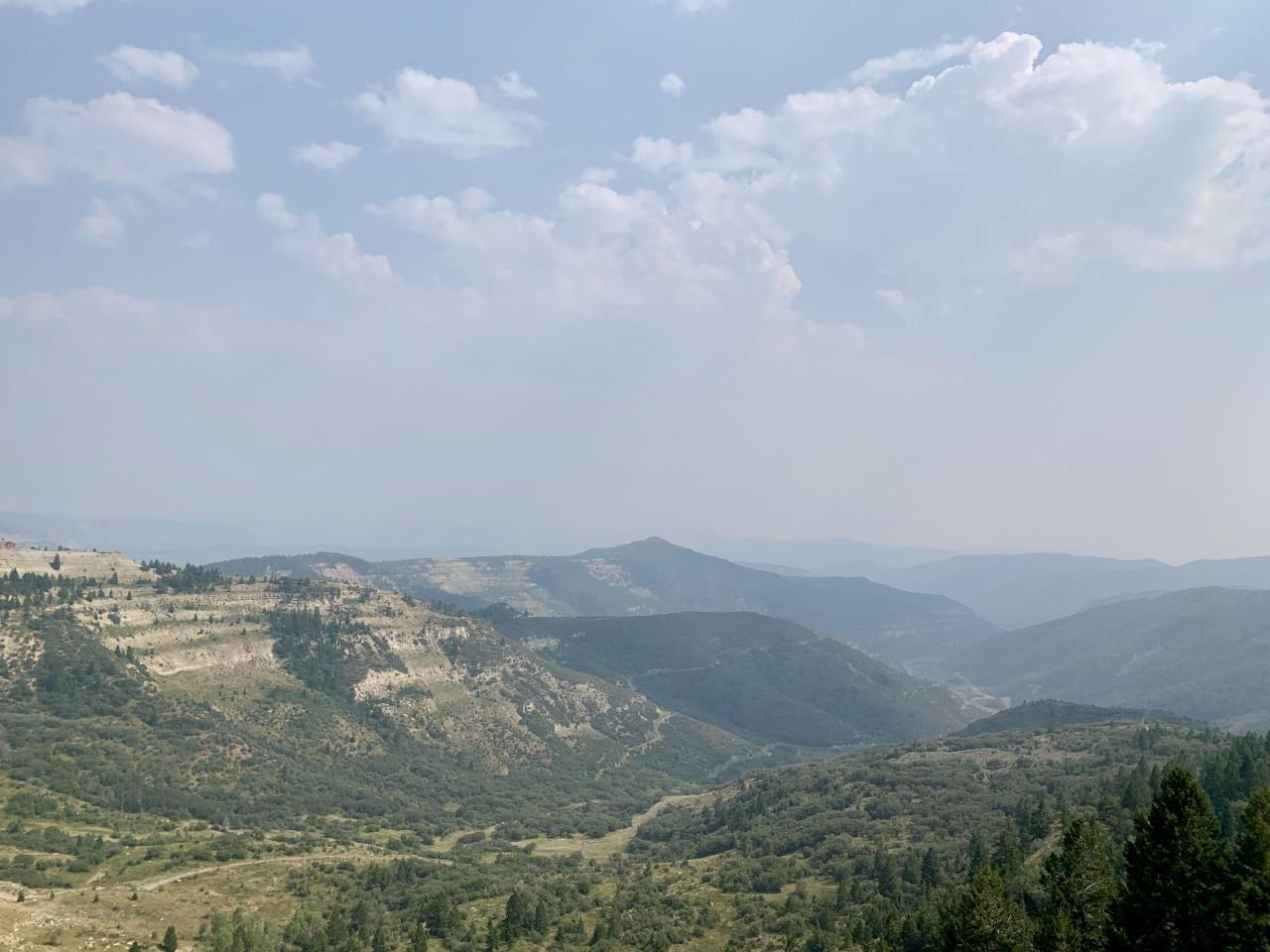
- Douglas Pass in August 2020.
- Interactive map of Douglas Pass
- Elevation: 8,205 ft (2,501 m)
- Traversed by: State Highway 139

Third Approach
- Location: Garfield County, Colorado, United States
- Range: Bookcliff Mountains
- Coordinates: 39°35′51″N 108°48′11″W
- Topo map: USGS Douglas Pass

Douglas Pass, elevation 8,205 feet (2,501 meters), is a mountain pass in the Book Cliffs of western Colorado. It is located in Garfield County and is traversed by State Highway 139. The pass divides the watersheds of West Douglas Creek to the north and East Salt Creek to the south. It is named for the Northern Ute, Chief Douglas.

The pass is not an especially high summit relative to other Colorado passes, and the road, though reasonably steep on the south side (7%), has no tight spots and only a few switchbacks. The summit gives an unusual view of the northeast face of the La Sal Mountains (twelve peaks over 12,000 feet), 76 miles (122 km) away in Utah. The remainder of the drive is basically in valleys following creeks.

The Utes had established a trail over the pass, which was subsequently used by European explorers and settlers. The Domínguez–Escalante expedition crossed the pass in 1776. Following the Ute trail, a road over the pass was constructed in the 1920s.

The mountain consists of shale strata belonging to the Green River Formation, exposures of which can be seen on the south side of the pass.
