= Mesa County Valley School District 51 =

School district in Colorado, United States

Address
- 2115 Grand Avenue Grand Junction, Colorado, 81501; United States

District information
- Type: Public
- Grades: PreK–12
- NCES District ID: 0804350

Students and staff
- Students: 21,084 (2020–2021)
- Teachers: 1,325.88 (on an FTE basis)
- Staff: 1,494.24 (on an FTE basis)
- Student–teacher ratio: 15.9:1

Other information
- Website: www.d51schools.org

Mesa County Valley School District 51 is a school district in Mesa County, Colorado, United States. It is the tenth largest school district in the state. It comprises the Grand Junction area.

== Elementary schools ==
- Broadway Elementary
- Chatfield Elementary
- Chipeta Elementary
- Clifton Elementary
- Columbine Elementary
- Dos Rios Elementary
- Dual Immersion Academy
- Fruitvale Elementary
- Lincoln Orchard Mesa Elementary
- Lincoln Park Elementary
- Loma Elementary
- Mesa View Elementary
- New Emerson Elementary
- Nisley Elementary
- Orchard Ave Elementary
- Pear Park Elementary
- Pomona Elementary
- Rim Rock Elementary
- Rocky Mountain Elementary
- Scenic Elementary
- Shelledy Elementary
- Taylor Elementary
- Thunder Mountain Elementary
- Tope Elementary
- Wingate Elementary

== Middle schools ==
- Bookcliff Middle School
- East Middle School
- Fruita Middle School
- Grand Mesa Middle School
- Mount Garfield Middle School
- Orchard Mesa Middle School
- Redlands Middle School
- West Middle School

== High schools ==
- Central High School
- Fruita Monument High School
- Grand Junction High School
- Palisade High School
- R-5 High School

== Special schools ==
- Caprock Academy (K–7 charter school)
- Career Center (alternative program)
- DYC (alternative program)
- Gateway (K–12 school)
- Grand River Academy (K–12 Virtual School) [47]
- Independence Academy (charter school)
- The Opportunity Center (alternative program)
- School Without Walls (alternative program)
- Valley School East (alternative program)
- Valley School West (alternative program)
- Young Parent (alternative program)
- WCCC (alternative program)
