= Uranium tailings =

Mining waste byproduct

Uranium tailings or uranium tails are a radioactive waste byproduct (tailings) of conventional uranium mining and uranium enrichment. They contain the radioactive decay products from the uranium decay chains, mainly the U-238 chain, and heavy metals. Long-term storage or disposal of tailings may pose a danger for public health and safety.

== Production ==
Uranium mill tailings are primarily the sandy process waste material from a conventional uranium mill. Milling is the first step in making fuel for nuclear reactors from natural uranium ore. The uranium extract is transformed into yellowcake.

The raw uranium ore is brought to the surface and crushed into a fine sand. The valuable uranium-bearing minerals are then removed via heap leaching with the use of acids or bases, and the remaining radioactive sludge, called "uranium tailings", is stored in huge impoundments. A short ton (907 kg) of ore yields one to five pounds (0.45 to 2.3 kg) of uranium depending on the uranium content of the mineral. Uranium tailings can retain up to 85% of the ore's original radioactivity.

== Composition ==
The tailings contain mainly decay products from the decay chain involving Uranium-238. Uranium tailings contain over a dozen radioactive nuclides, which are the primary hazard posed by the tailings. The most important of these are thorium-230, radium-226, radon-222 (radon gas) and the daughter isotopes of radon decay, including polonium-210. All of those are naturally occurring radioactive materials or "NORM".

== Health risks ==
Tailings contain heavy metals and radioactive radium. Radium then decays over thousands of years and radioactive radon gas is produced. Tailings are kept in piles for long-term storage or disposal and need to be maintained and monitored for leaks over the long term.

If uranium tailings are stored aboveground and allowed to dry out, the radioactive sand can be carried great distances by the wind, entering the food chain and bodies of water. The danger posed by such sand dispersal is uncertain at best given the dilution effect of dispersal. The majority of tailing mass will be inert rock, just as it was in the raw ore before the extraction of the uranium, but physically altered, ground up, mixed with large amounts of water and exposed to atmospheric oxygen, which can substantially alter chemical behaviour.

An EPA estimate of risk based on uranium tailings deposits existing in the United States in 1983 gave the figure of 500 lung cancer deaths per century if no countermeasures are taken.

== See also ==
- List of uranium mines
- Uranium Mill Tailings Radiation Control Act
