= Fruita Monument High School =

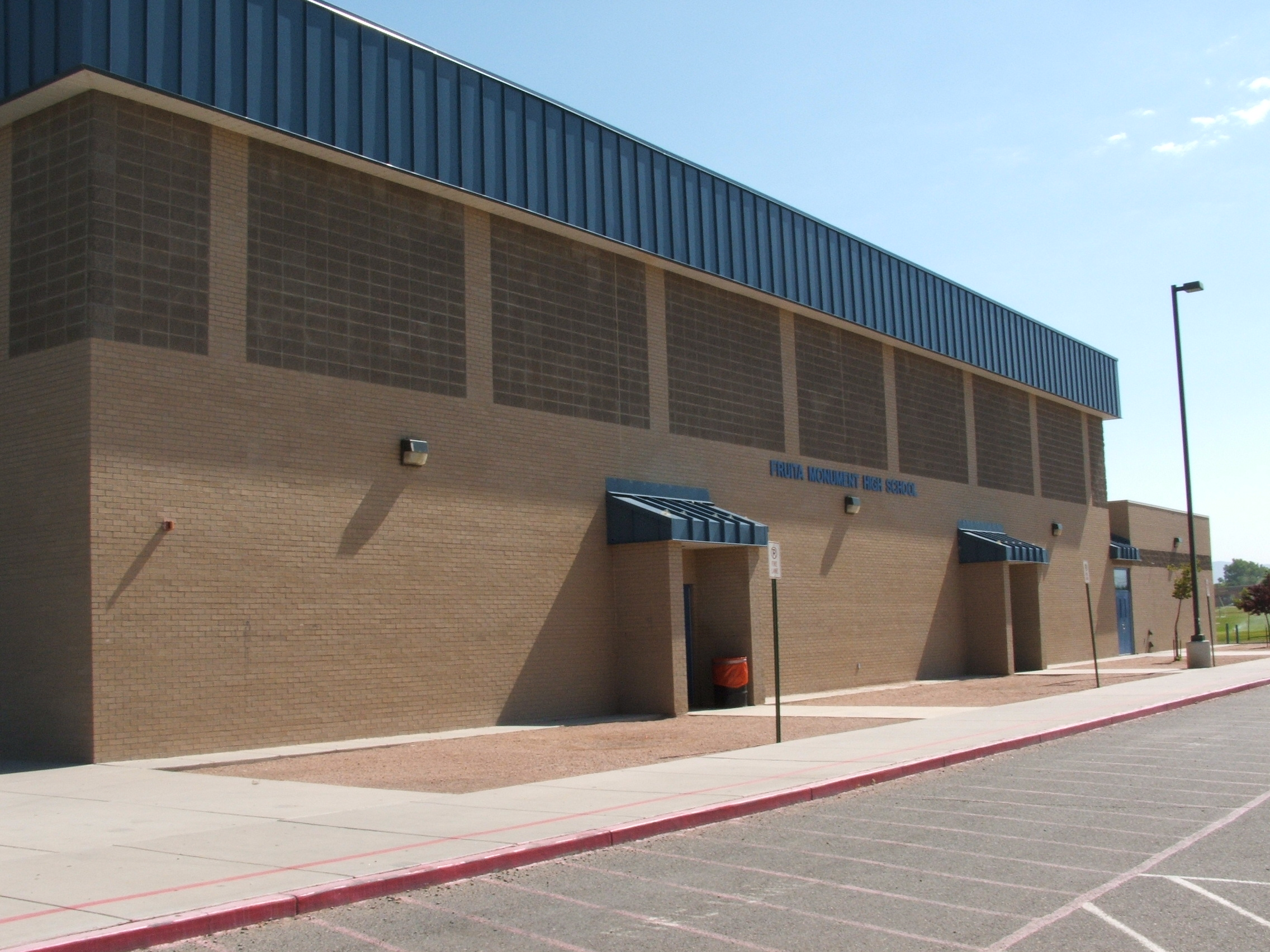
- Fruita Monument High School in 2006

Location
- 1815 Wildcat Avenue; Fruita, Colorado 81521; United States; 39°8′53″N 108°43′2″W

Information
- School type: Public high school
- Founded: 1905 (121 years ago)
- School district: Mesa County Valley 51
- CEEB code: 060630
- NCES School ID: 080435000609
- Principal: Newt Klusmire
- Teaching staff: 73.81
- Grades: 9–12
- Enrollment: 1,427 (2024–2025)
- Student to teacher ratio: 19.33
- Colors: Blue and white
- Athletics conference: CHSAA
- Mascot: Wildcat
- Website: fmhs.d51schools.org

Fruita Monument High School is a public high school located in Fruita, Colorado, United States, serving 9-12th grades. It is part of Mesa County Valley School District 51.

== History ==
The first purpose-built high school building in Fruita was completed in 1905 under the name Fruita Union High School. After that structure burned down in 1934, classes were held in a local armory. A new building was finished in 1936 and lasted until 1969, when a third location was built under the name Fruita Monument High School.

A 2017 referendum resulted in a $12 million construction project to improve the safety of the school.

== Athletics ==
Wildcat athletic teams are classified as 5A by the Colorado High School Activities Association.

State Championships
Sport	Year(s)
Baseball	1970, 1993
Basketball (boys)	1983, 1982
Basketball (girls)	1982, 1983, 1989
Golf	1983
Softball	1989
Spirit	2000
Wrestling	1964, 1982, 1983
Volleyball	1983

== Notable people ==
Alumni

- Jim Brenneman, baseball player
- James Niehues, artist and cartographer
- Maggie Baird, actress

Faculty

- James Van Pelt, author (taught English)

== See also ==
- List of high schools in Colorado
