= Uranium Mill Tailings Radiation Control Act =

US environmental law

- Long title: An Act to authorize the Secretary of Energy to enter into cooperative agreements with certain States respecting residual radioactive material at existing sites, to provide for the regulation of uranium mill tailings under the Atomic Energy Act of 1954, and for other purposes.
- Acronyms (colloquial): UMTRCA
- Nicknames: Uranium Mill Tailings Radiation Control Act of 1978
- Enacted by: the 95th United States Congress
- Effective: November 8, 1978

Citations
- Public law: 95-604
- Statutes at Large: 92 Stat. 3021

Codification
- Titles amended: 42 U.S.C.: Public Health and Social Welfare
- U.S.C. sections created: 42 U.S.C. ch. 88 § 7901 et seq.

Legislative history
- Introduced in the House as H.R. 13650 by Morris K. Udall (D-AZ) on July 28, 1978; Committee consideration by House Interior and Insular Affairs, House Interstate and Foreign Commerce; Passed the House on October 3, 1978 (passed division vote); Passed the Senate on October 13, 1978 (agreed) with amendment; House agreed to Senate amendment on October 14, 1978 (agreed) with further amendment; Senate agreed to House amendment on October 14, 1978 (Agreed); Signed into law by President Jimmy Carter on November 8, 1978

Major amendments
- Public Law 97-415, 96 Stat. 2067, subsection (e)(3) (1983); Public Law 100-616, 102 Stat. 3192, subsection (a), section 8(b) (1988); Public Law 102-486, 106 Stat. 2776, subsection (a) (1992); Public Law 104-259, 110 Stat. 3173, subsection (a), subsection (d) (1996); Public Law 106-398, 114 Stat. 1654, subsection (f) (2000)

The Uranium Mill Tailings Radiation Control Act (1978) is a United States environmental law that amended the Atomic Energy Act of 1954 and authorized the Environmental Protection Agency to establish health and environmental standards for the stabilization, restoration, and disposal of uranium mill waste. Title 1 of the Act required the EPA to set environmental protection standards consistent with the Resource Conservation and Recovery Act, including groundwater protection limits; the Department of Energy to implement EPA standards and provide perpetual care for some sites; and the Nuclear Regulatory Commission to review cleanups and license sites to states or the DOE for perpetual care. Title 1 established a uranium mill remedial action program jointly funded by the federal government and the state. Title 1 of the Act also designated 22 inactive uranium mill sites for remediation, resulting in the containment of 40 million cubic yards of low-level radioactive material in UMTRCA Title 1 holding cells.

== Limitations ==
The act was written in the "hectic final days" of the 95th U.S. Congress and contained multiple errors that made it "a nightmare of statutory construction," and required remedial legislation to fix. The act perpetuated the "Agreement State" program, established in 1959, in which the Atomic Energy Commission gave regulatory authority of certain nuclear materials to states. It was unclear how much regulatory power Agreement states had, and as a result these states took little regulatory action. Sites that were owned by the federal government, the NRC, or Agreement states were ineligible for remedial action under the UMTRCA, as they were instead the responsibility of the government agencies or states who owned them.

== See also ==
- Uranium Mill Tailings Remedial Action
- Uranium mining
