= Palisade High School =

Location
- 3679 G Rd; Palisade, Colorado 81526; United States; 39°06′19″N 108°22′12″W

Information
- Type: Public secondary school
- Motto: "Seeking excellence in academics, activities, and athletics"
- Established: 1904 (122 years ago)
- School district: Mesa County Valley School District (District 51)
- CEEB code: 061140
- Principal: Dan Bollinger
- Teaching staff: 58.33 (FTE)
- Enrollment: 1,069 (2023-2024)
- Student to teacher ratio: 18.33
- Colors: Maroon and white
- Mascot: Bulldog
- Website: phs.d51schools.org

Palisade Senior High School is a high school located in Palisade, Colorado, United States. It is part of the Mesa County Valley School District 51. It is situated on the western edge of Palisade, on the "old highway" (US Highway 6). The town of Palisade and the school were founded in 1904. The current school building was completed in 1992, making it one of the more modern schools in the district.

Palisade High School is a participant International Baccalaureate (IB) school, the first in District 51.

== History ==
The first Palisade School was built in 1893 on Second Street just east of Main Street. A second Palisade School was built on the corner of Fourth and Kluge. The third Palisade School was built in 1910 on the corner of Iowa and 7th Street. It was demolished in December 1970. Palisade High School was built in 1925 and a gymnasium added later as a WPA project. That building remained in operation until 1992 (though it had been continually modified and added onto), when the current facility was opened on 3679 "G" Road.

Several traditions are held at Palisade which have their roots in the community. For instance, starting in 1949, every homecoming week the senior class "enslaves" the freshmen, forcing them to carry rocks up the Orchard Mesa hill, whitewash them, and put them into a large "P" that can be seen through the Grand Valley.

The original mascot of the school was the "Palisade Peaches," a reference to the rich fruit orchards of the region, especially famous for sweet peaches. However, in the 1920s, a student, Marion Bowman, brought his British bulldog to football games, and the dog soon became a school favorite. In his honor, the mascot was changed to the current Palisade Bulldogs, and is now named "Spike". A bronze statue of a bulldog graces the foyer of the school. It was sculpted and donated by Parker G. C. Inc.

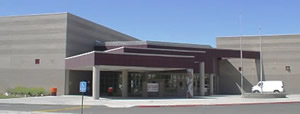
Palisade High School from "G" Road before the addition of the second row of doors

== Curriculum ==
Palisade offers several Advanced Placement (AP) classes and IB classes.

A movement that began at PHS, the PACK program, is an integral part of Palisade academics. Students with any grades below passing, or a C, must spend the first half of lunch in Content Tutoring, where they get homework help. This program has begun to gain popularity with other schools in the district.

Apart from these programs, Palisade High School's curriculum is that of any school in District 51. This includes a 25 credit system, drawing from a variety of subjects. Three credits are required in mathematics, science, and social studies, and four credits in English. Also required are credits in PE, computer literacy, fine arts, and other general electives. PHS offers a variety of classes, including unique classes such as food science and technical education, which fit into various credit requirements.

== Extracurricular activities ==
=== Athletics ===
Athletics at Palisade High include:

- Baseball
- Basketball (boys' and girls')
- Cross country (boys' and girls')
- Football
- Golf (boys' and girls')
- Soccer (boys' and girls')
- Softball (girls')
- Swimming (girls')
- Track
- Volleyball (girls')
- Wrestling

Early in the 1990s, the football team won four consecutive Colorado State 3A Championships.

=== Non-athletic ===
The school's Knowledge Bowl team won the 4A state title two years. Since 2005, the school's Speech and Debate team has had six State Champions and one National Champion.

PHS offers a "club day" on Monday's in which students are exempt from Office Hours and Advisory, and freshmen are required to attend at least one club.

== See also ==
- List of high schools in Colorado
- List of high schools in Mesa County, Colorado
