= Escalante Creek =

- The creek in 2026

- Location of the mouth in Colorado

Location
- Countries: United States
- States: Colorado
- Counties: Delta, Montrose and Mesa

Physical characteristics
- Source: Confluence of East Fork Escalante Creek and Middle Fork Escalante Creek
  - location: Mesa County, Colorado
  - coordinates: 38°34′54.95″N 108°24′22.31″W
- Mouth: Confluence with the Gunnison River
  - location: Delta County, Colorado
  - coordinates: 38°45′32″N 108°15′33″W
  - elevation: 4,808 feet (1,465 meters)
- Length: 20 miles (32 kilometers)
- Basin size: 209 square miles (540 square kilometers)

Basin features
- Progression: Gunnison → Colorado
- Tributaries
  - left: Middle Fork Escalante Creek; Kelso Creek; North Fork Escalante Creek
  - right: East Fork Escalante Creek; Dry Fork Escalante Creek

Escalante Creek is a tributary of the Gunnison River in Delta, Montrose and Mesa counties in Colorado, U.S. The creek flows through Escalante Canyon within the Dominguez–Escalante National Conservation Area.

== Course ==
The creek rises in the Uncompahgre National Forest in Mesa County, Colorado and flows generally northeast. It soon passes through Montrose County, Colorado, and then it passes into Delta County, Colorado for the rest of its course. The creek follows Escalante Canyon Road (also called 650 Road) through most of its course. The creek empties into the Gunnison River near a road bridge that crosses the river.

== Public lands ==
The creek starts on the Uncompahgre Plateau in the Uncompahgre National Forest. Then it enters the Dominguez-Escalante National Conservation Area. It passes through The East Walker Tract of the Escalante State Wildlife Area, the site of the historic Walker Cabin, a stone house erected in 1911 by early settlers. Still, much of the land on either side of the creek is privately owned. However, The Bureau of Land Management, which administers the conservation area, in 2026 acquired a 4,000-acre (1,600-hectare) cattle ranch that will be added to the public lands, including land adjacent to Escalante Creek.

== Stream gauge ==
The USGS operates a stream gauge along the creek just before its confluence with the Gunnison River.

== See also ==
- List of rivers of Colorado
