= Ridgway, Colorado =

Town in Colorado, United States

- Home rule town
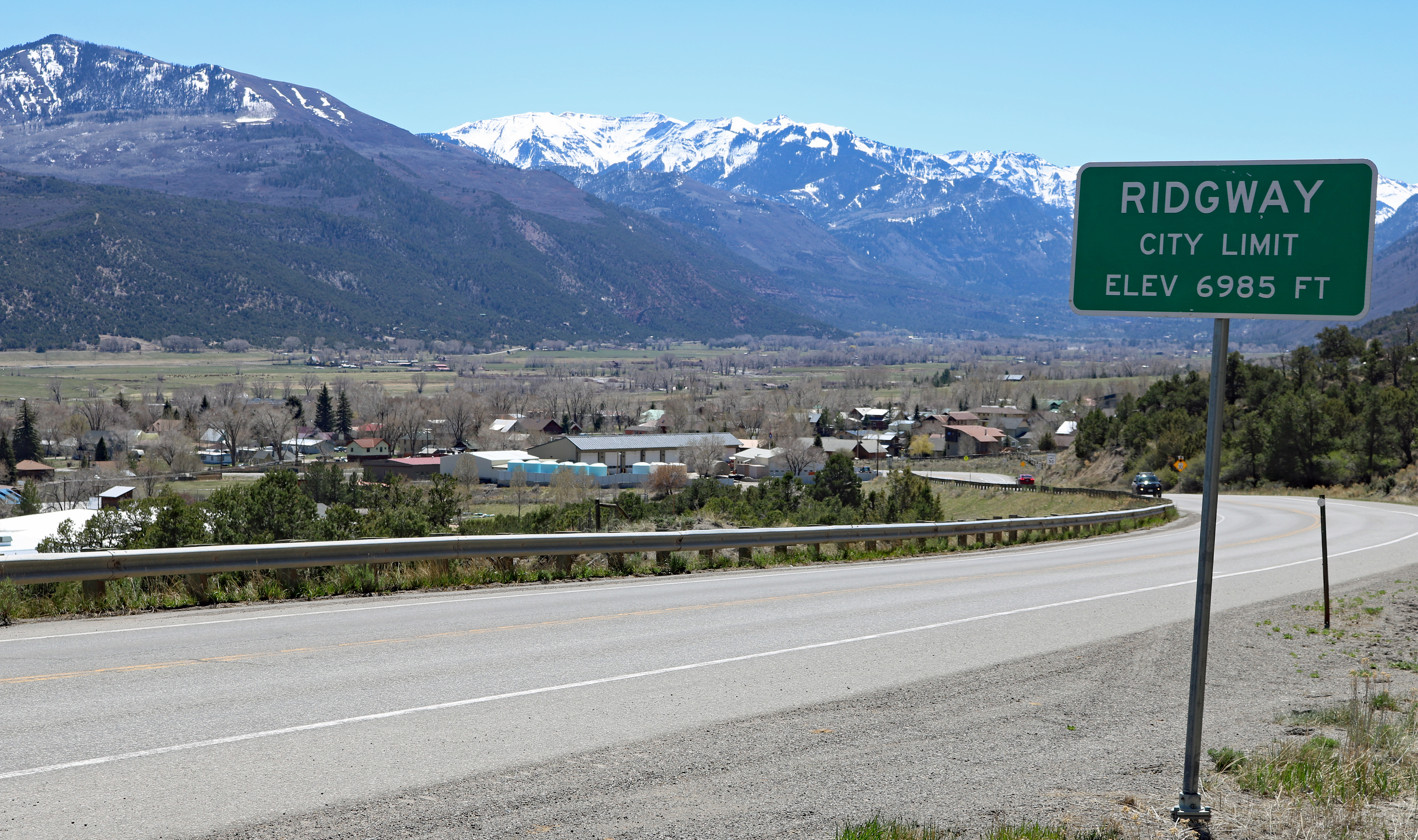
- Approaching Ridgway on Highway 62
- Nicknames: Gateway to the San Juans, The Town That Refused to Die
- Motto: "Think Outside"
- Location of Ridgway in Ouray County, Colorado.
- Coordinates: 38°09′32″N 107°45′02″W
- Country: United States
- State: Colorado
- County: Ouray
- Incorporated (town): April 2, 1891
- Named for: Robert M. Ridgway

Government
  - Type: Home rule municipality

Area
  - Total: 1.85 sq mi (4.79 km^{2})
  - Land: 1.85 sq mi (4.79 km^{2})
  - Water: 0 sq mi (0.00 km^{2})
- Elevation: 6,962 ft (2,122 m)

Population (2020)
  - Total: 1,183
  - Density: 640/sq mi (247/km^{2})
- Time zone: UTC-7 (Mountain (MST))
  - Summer (DST): UTC-6 (MDT)
- ZIP code: 81432
- Area code: 970
- FIPS code: 08-64200
- GNIS feature ID: 2412551
- Website: townofridgway.colorado.gov

The Town of Ridgway is a home rule municipality that is the most populous municipality in Ouray County, Colorado, United States. The town is a former railroad stop on the Uncompahgre River in the northern San Juan Mountains. The town population was 1,183 at the 2020 census.

Steep forested mountains and cliffs surround Ridgway on the south, east, and northeast. The Uncompahgre River runs through the town and flows into the Ridgway State Park and Reservoir, to the north. Dallas Creek also flows from the south-west and forms a confluence with the Uncompahgre before entering the reservoir. There is a notable wildlife presence — mountain lions, badgers, deer, elk, bears, coyotes, wild turkey, and bald eagles are indigenous to the area. The region's bald eagles nest in the cottonwoods along the river and are a common sight in the late fall.

Ridgway and the surrounding area have featured prominently in pop culture. Most notably the area is the setting of John Wayne's western movie True Grit, and others including How the West Was Won and Tribute to a Bad Man. Ridgway has the only stoplight in Ouray County, at the intersection of Highways 550 and 62.

== History ==
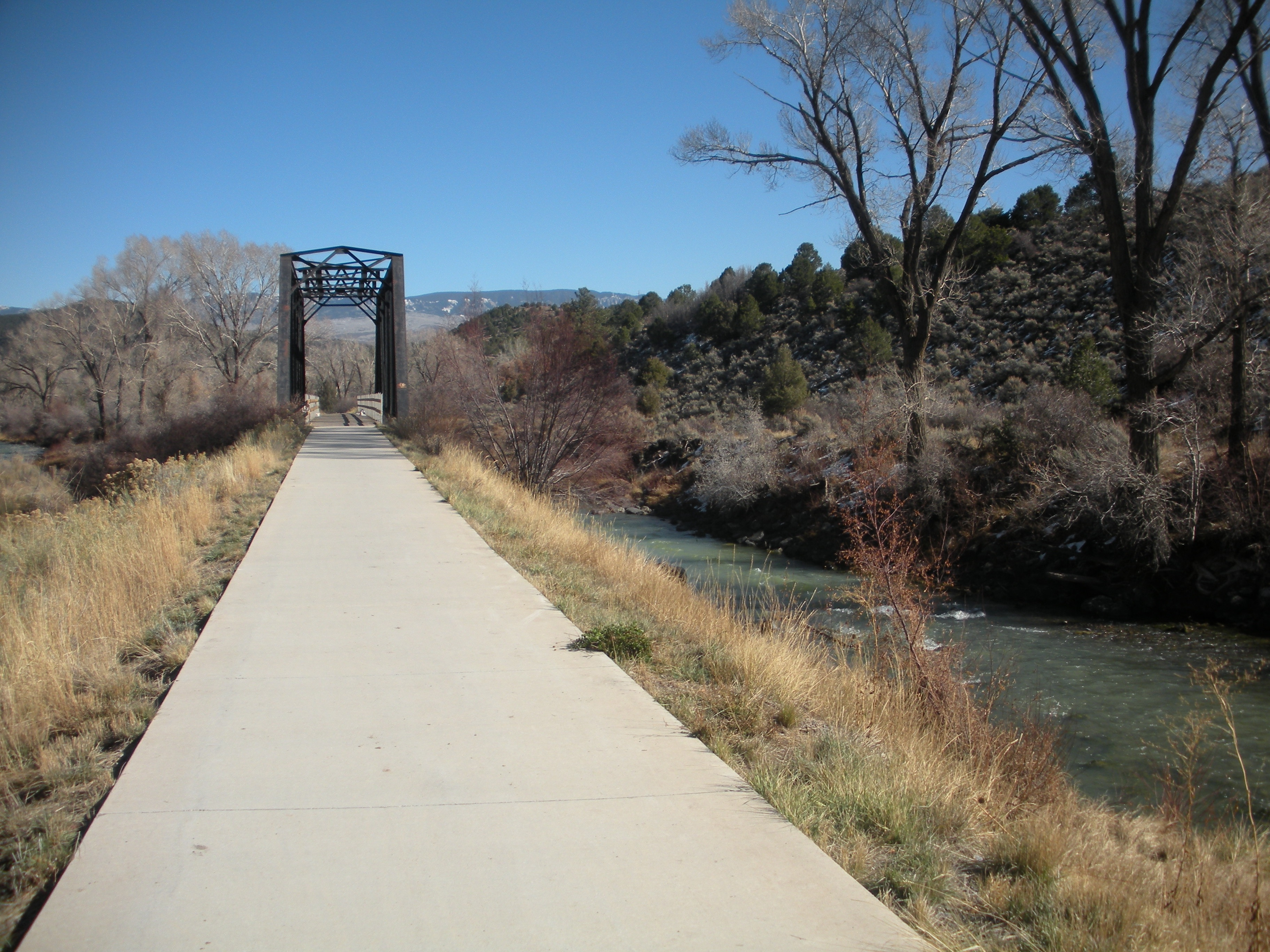
Path along the Uncompaghre river that leads from the town to the reservoir

Ridgway began as a railroad town, serving the nearby mining towns of Telluride and Ouray.

The town site is at the northern terminus of the Rio Grande Southern Railroad where it meets with Denver and Rio Grande Western Railroad running between Montrose and Ouray. Ridgway was located about 3 miles (4.8 km) south of the existing town of Dallas. Articles of incorporation were filed on May 22, 1890, and granted on March 4, 1891. This "Gateway to the San Juans" position was recognized over 100 years ago when the Rio Grande Southern established Ridgway as a railhead center servicing the nearby mining towns of Ouray and Telluride. The town was named for Denver and Rio Grande railroad superintendent Robert M. Ridgway, who established the town in 1891.

The Rio Grande Southern filed for abandonment on April 24, 1952, and the Denver and Rio Grande Western abandoned the line between Ridgway and Ouray on March 21, 1953. The line between Ridgway and Montrose was upgraded from narrow gauge to standard gauge and Ridgway continued to be a shipping point until the line to Montrose was abandoned in 1976 as result of a reservoir being built on the Uncompahgre River.

The dam for that reservoir, the Ridgway Dam, was proposed in 1957 as part of the U.S. Bureau of Reclamation's Dallas Creek Project, and its original location would have inundated Ridgway. A 1975 decision to put the dam further downstream kept the town above-water, and residents coined their own nickname, "The Town that Refused to Die." Land around the reservoir became the Ridgway State Park north of town limits.

== Geography ==
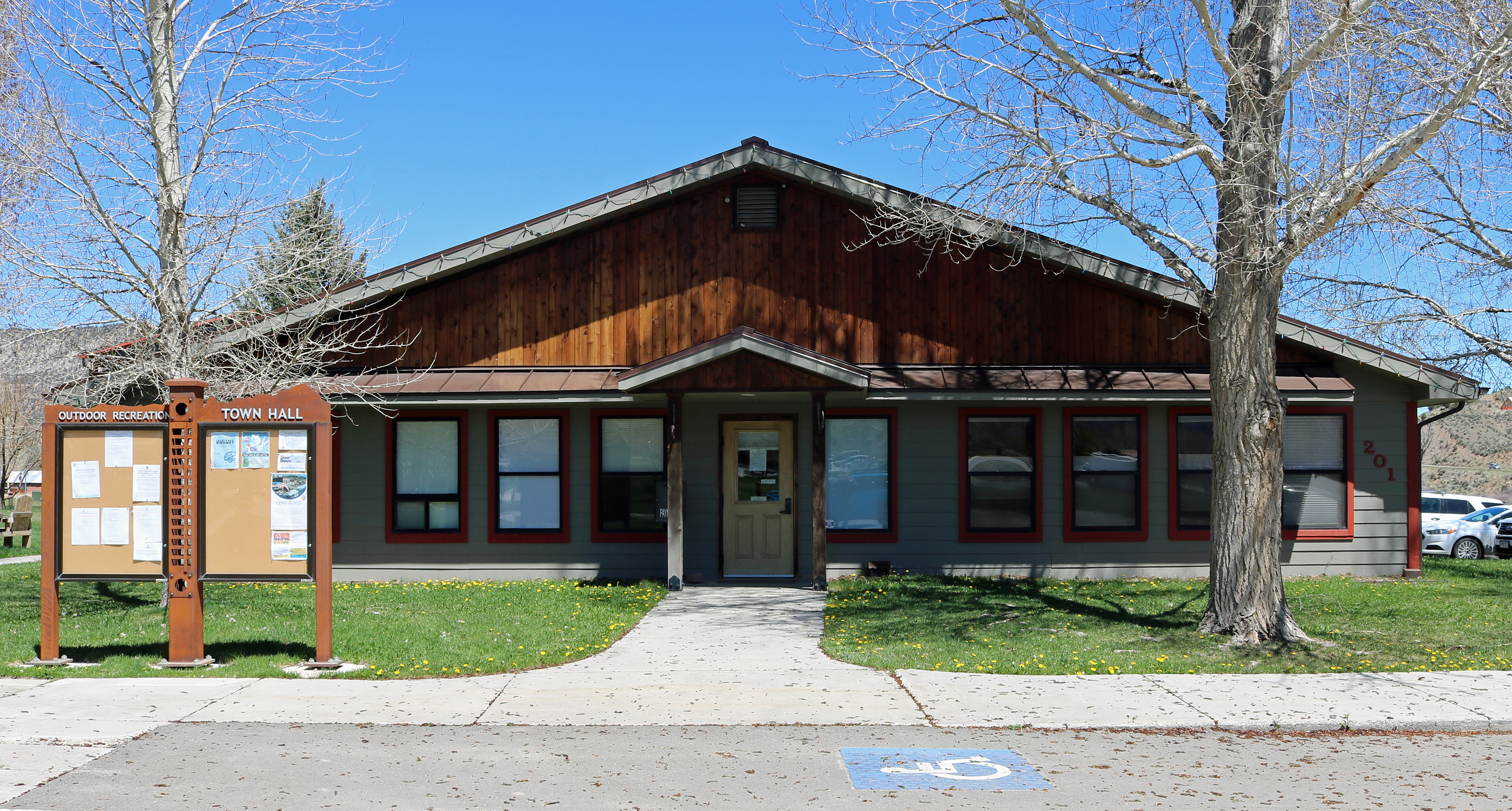
Ridgway Town Hall

Ridgway is situated in the Uncompahgre Valley at an elevation of 6,985 feet (2,129 m). The town is located on the San Juan Skyway, cradled in the heart of some of the most photographed mountains in the world. The nearby San Juan Mountain Range has 14 of Colorado's 53 peaks over 14,000 feet. Among them, 14,150 feet (4,310 m) Mt. Sneffels is most prominent from Ridgway. The eponymous Mt. Ridgway, 13,468 feet (4,105 m) in height, is also nearby, 4.5 miles (7.2 km) west of Ouray. To the east of the town also lies the smaller but equally-grand Cimarron Range, with Uncompahgre Peak at 14,309 feet (4,361 m).

The Uncompahgre River flows from Lake Como at 12,215 feet (3,723 m) in northern San Juan County, in the Uncompahgre National Forest in the northwestern San Juan Mountains is the headwaters of the river. It flows northwest past Ouray, Ridgway, Montrose, and Olathe and joins the Gunnison at Confluence Park in Delta. The river forms Poughkeepsie Gulch and the Uncompahgre Gorge. The major tributaries are all creeks draining the northwest San Juan Mountains. There are two dams on the Uncompahgre River, a small diversion dam in the Uncompahgre Gorge, and Ridgway Dam below Ridgway, which forms Ridgway Reservoir.

The river is used for irrigation in the Uncompahgre Valley. The Uncompahgre is unnavigable, except at high water. The name given to the river comes from the Ute word Uncompaghre, which loosely translates to "dirty water" or "red water spring" and is likely a reference to the many hot springs in the vicinity of Ouray. Lake Otonawanda is the primary source of Ridgway's municipal water.

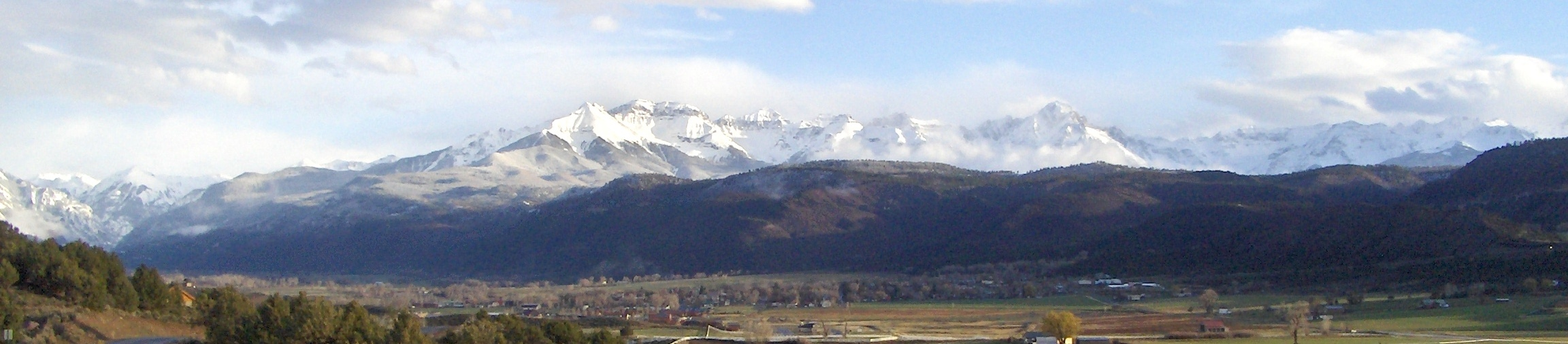
Panorama of the Sneffels Range with Ridgway below

=== Climate ===
Ridgway has a humid continental climate (Koppen: Dfb) with four distinct seasons. Summers are usually warm to hot while winter days are cold with nighttime temperatures dropping close to zero. Annual snowfall is heavy, averaging 85 inches (220 cm).

Climate data for Ridgway, Colorado, 1991–2020 normals, extremes 1982–present
Month	Jan	Feb	Mar	Apr	May	Jun	Jul	Aug	Sep	Oct	Nov	Dec	Year
Record high °F (°C)	62 (17)	67 (19)	85 (29)	80 (27)	89 (32)	98 (37)	99 (37)	97 (36)	96 (36)	85 (29)	74 (23)	65 (18)	99 (37)
Mean maximum °F (°C)	53.9 (12.2)	56.4 (13.6)	66.7 (19.3)	73.2 (22.9)	81.2 (27.3)	89.5 (31.9)	92.1 (33.4)	89.1 (31.7)	85.6 (29.8)	77.5 (25.3)	66.4 (19.1)	54.9 (12.7)	92.8 (33.8)
Mean daily maximum °F (°C)	40.3 (4.6)	44.0 (6.7)	52.5 (11.4)	58.8 (14.9)	69.7 (20.9)	81.3 (27.4)	85.4 (29.7)	82.3 (27.9)	75.8 (24.3)	63.9 (17.7)	50.7 (10.4)	39.9 (4.4)	62.0 (16.7)
Daily mean °F (°C)	23.4 (−4.8)	27.9 (−2.3)	36.3 (2.4)	42.5 (5.8)	51.6 (10.9)	60.3 (15.7)	65.8 (18.8)	63.4 (17.4)	56.0 (13.3)	44.8 (7.1)	33.6 (0.9)	23.8 (−4.6)	44.1 (6.7)
Mean daily minimum °F (°C)	6.5 (−14.2)	11.9 (−11.2)	20.2 (−6.6)	26.2 (−3.2)	33.6 (0.9)	39.4 (4.1)	46.3 (7.9)	44.6 (7.0)	36.2 (2.3)	25.7 (−3.5)	16.4 (−8.7)	7.6 (−13.6)	26.2 (−3.2)
Mean minimum °F (°C)	−11.8 (−24.3)	−7.2 (−21.8)	2.4 (−16.4)	13.8 (−10.1)	22.6 (−5.2)	29.8 (−1.2)	38.0 (3.3)	36.7 (2.6)	24.5 (−4.2)	12.2 (−11.0)	−3.0 (−19.4)	−12.0 (−24.4)	−17.6 (−27.6)
Record low °F (°C)	−33 (−36)	−36 (−38)	−21 (−29)	3 (−16)	16 (−9)	19 (−7)	30 (−1)	29 (−2)	14 (−10)	−6 (−21)	−18 (−28)	−26 (−32)	−36 (−38)
Average precipitation inches (mm)	1.02 (26)	0.92 (23)	1.27 (32)	1.43 (36)	1.50 (38)	0.81 (21)	1.87 (47)	2.04 (52)	1.59 (40)	1.36 (35)	1.21 (31)	1.10 (28)	16.12 (409)
Average snowfall inches (cm)	13.6 (35)	12.6 (32)	13.6 (35)	7.3 (19)	1.4 (3.6)	0.0 (0.0)	0.0 (0.0)	0.0 (0.0)	0.3 (0.76)	4.4 (11)	11.4 (29)	16.4 (42)	81.0 (206)
Average extreme snow depth inches (cm)	9.9 (25)	9.5 (24)	7.1 (18)	4.5 (11)	1.3 (3.3)	0.0 (0.0)	0.0 (0.0)	0.0 (0.0)	0.2 (0.51)	3.6 (9.1)	7.1 (18)	9.8 (25)	13.4 (34)
Average precipitation days (≥ 0.01 in)	6.2	6.4	6.4	7.7	7.5	4.4	10.2	11.4	7.8	5.9	5.8	6.7	86.4
Average snowy days (≥ 0.1 in)	5.8	4.9	4.6	2.5	0.6	0.0	0.0	0.0	0.1	1.4	3.5	6.1	29.5
Source 1: NOAA
Source 2: National Weather Service

== Demographics ==
Historical population
Census	Pop.	Note	%±
1900	245		—
1910	376		53.5%
1920	400		6.4%
1930	239		−40.2%
1940	354		48.1%
1950	209		−41.0%
1960	254		21.5%
1970	262		3.1%
1980	369		40.8%
1990	423		14.6%
2000	713		68.6%
2010	924		29.6%
2020	1,183		28.0%
U.S. Decennial Census

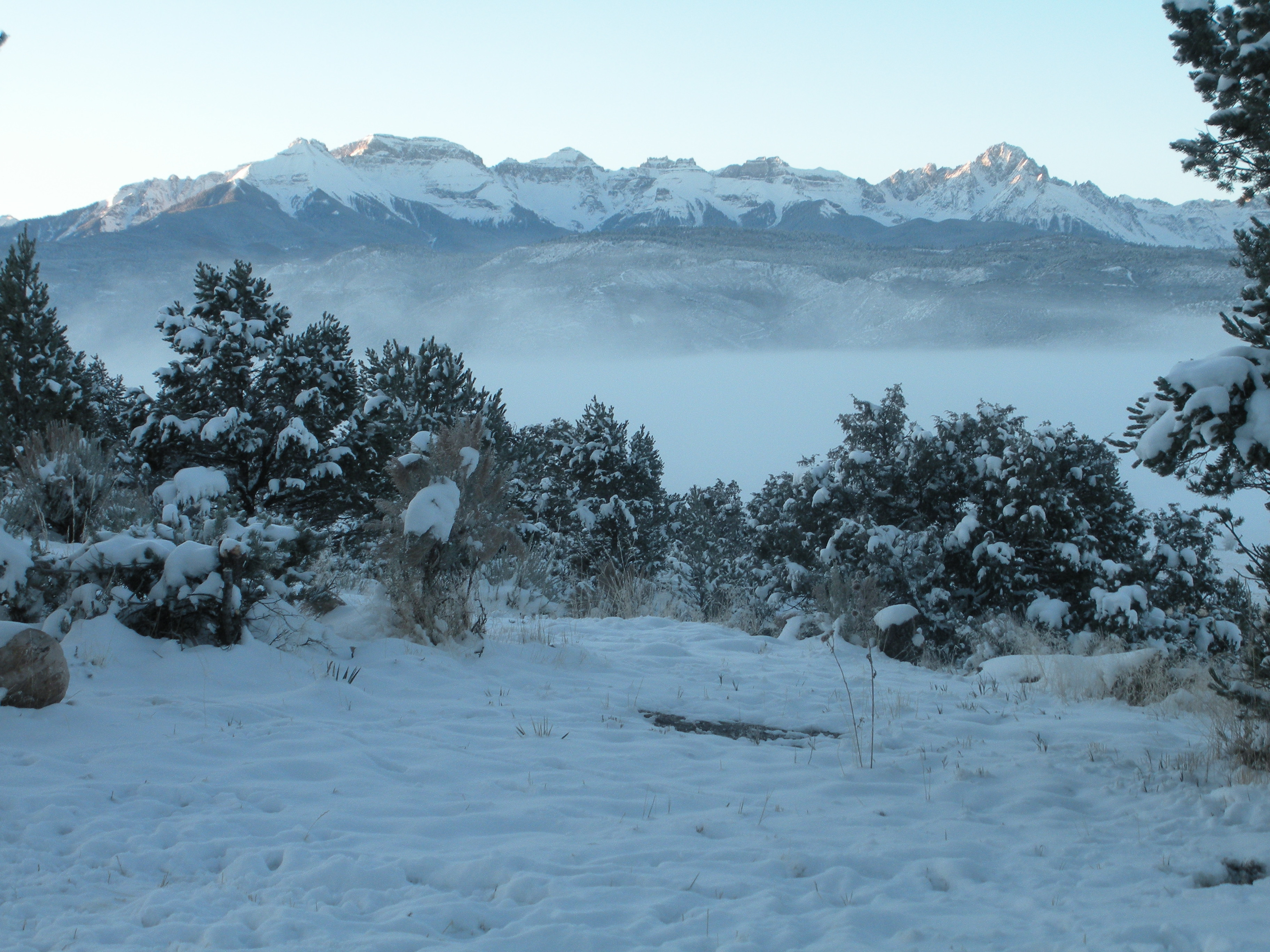
Morning near Ridgway after heavy snowfall

=== 2020 census ===
As of the 2020 census, Ridgway had a population of 1,183. The median age was 45.5 years. 19.1% of residents were under the age of 18 and 21.1% of residents were 65 years of age or older. For every 100 females there were 92.7 males, and for every 100 females age 18 and over there were 90.6 males age 18 and over.

0.0% of residents lived in urban areas, while 100.0% lived in rural areas.

There were 540 households in Ridgway, of which 28.0% had children under the age of 18 living in them. Of all households, 46.7% were married-couple households, 18.3% were households with a male householder and no spouse or partner present, and 28.0% were households with a female householder and no spouse or partner present. About 32.6% of all households were made up of individuals and 13.5% had someone living alone who was 65 years of age or older.

There were 629 housing units, of which 14.1% were vacant. The homeowner vacancy rate was 3.6% and the rental vacancy rate was 7.7%.

Racial composition as of the 2020 census
Race	Number	Percent
White	1,063	89.9%
Black or African American	5	0.4%
American Indian and Alaska Native	1	0.1%
Asian	12	1.0%
Native Hawaiian and Other Pacific Islander	0	0.0%
Some other race	32	2.7%
Two or more races	70	5.9%
Hispanic or Latino (of any race)	78	6.6%

=== 2010 census ===
As of the census of 2010, there were 924 people, 404 households, and 256 families residing in the town. The population density was 462 inhabitants per square mile (178/km^{2}). There were 511 housing units at an average density of 255.5 units per square mile (98.6 units/km^{2}). The racial makeup of the town was 95.5% White, 0.1% (1) African American, 0.6% (6) Native American, 0.8% (7) Asian, 0.8% (7) from other races, and 1.8% (17) from two or more races. Hispanic or Latino of any race were 5.0% of the population.

There were 404 households, out of which 31.4% had children under the age of 18 living with them, 51.2% were married couples living together, 7.7% had a female householder with no husband present, 4.5% had a male householder with no wife present, and 36.6% were non-families. 28.7% of all households were made up of individuals, and 4.9% had someone living alone who was 65 years of age or older. The average household size was 2.29 and the average family size was 2.82.

In the town, the population was spread out, with 23.3% under the age of 18, 28.6% from 18 to 44, 37.1% from 45 to 64, and 11.0% who were 65 years of age or older. The median age was 43.7 years. For every 100 females, there were 94.5 males. For every 100 females age 18 and over, there were 93.7 males.

The median income for a household in the town was $40,903, and the median income for a family was $45,208. Males had a median income of $31,597 versus $26,250 for females. The per capita income for the town was $20,084. About 3.2% of families and 4.3% of the population were below the poverty line, including 6.9% of those under age 18 and none of those age 65 or over.

== Tourism and culture ==
Ridgway, a major tourist mountain town, is positioned on a highway that leads tourists to several other mountain towns of the San Juan region. Ridgway is 37 miles east of Telluride and 10 miles north of the Ouray. The area is also set at the base of the San Juan Mountains providing excellent views especially when viewed from Log Hill Mesa.

=== The Grammy Awards ===
The Grammy Award trophy is hand crafted exclusively by John Billings (the 'Grammy Man') and his team of craftsmen at Billings Artworks in Ridgway. The trophies are all hand cast in an alloy called grammium, then hand filed, ground and polished before being plated in 24k gold.

=== Certified Colorado Creative District ===
In 2011, in collaboration with Ouray County and the City of Ouray through numerous public meetings and pursuant to a request from the State of Colorado for a "Bottom Up" Economic Development Plan, a county-wide economic development plan was created. Goal 3 of this plan called for participation in statewide efforts to grow and nurture creative industries as an economic development driver for the State. The Goal 3 ("G3") committee was formed and approached the Ridgway Town Council for support and leadership in submitting an application to become a certified Creative District with the State. The City of Ouray, Ouray County and Town of Ridgway volunteers all agreed that the Town of Ridgway would be the applicant for District certification in 2012. 15 awards were issued through Colorado Creative Industries, and Ridgway was one of 5 districts awarded Prospective District status.

The Ridgway Creative District was awarded Prospective Creative District status in 2012 under the State of Colorado legislation, House Bill 11–1031, signed into law by Governor Hickenlooper in 2011. After a year as a Prospective District, on June 26, 2013, Colorado Creative Industries and the Boettcher Foundation announced that the Ridgway Creative District had achieved State-Certified Creative District Designation.

=== The Sherbino Theater ===
The Sherbino/Cherbeneau/Charbonneau family have been a part of Ridgway since before Ridgway was even incorporated. And their local legacy – The Sherbino – still plays a major role in downtown Ridgway today. In 1877, Louis Sherbino purchased several lots in downtown Ridgway from Samuel Wade. Louis, who was born in Canada but was working in the timber mills in Michigan, moved to Lake City, then Rico, then Colona and finally Ridgway in the late 1800s. On May 21, 1915, rumors that had been circulating were confirmed, as Louis presented an application to the town for permission to erect a "pressed brick veneered building" on Clinton Street and a 6' sidewalk along the Cora Street side. The building turned out to be a theater designed by Gus Kullerstrand of Ouray and it opened to much fanfare on Saturday, September 11, 1915. The newspaper coverage from September 17 says, "Close to 400 people took in the event, all parts of the country being represented by a goodly number of persons. The lineup of rigs and automobiles in front of the building gave the town a citified look." The article went on to mention there was seating for 300, running hot and cold water, and toilets! What is now the Colorado Boy Brewery was part of the theater at the time, accounting for the reported amount of space for seating. The Sherbino family ran the theater for less than a year as another local built a "motion picture business" and most people went there.

The Sherbino building went on to be used as a community center. Local residents gathered there in 1917 to learn that the US had entered WWI. In 1924, many local residents who had come into the region by wagon in the 1870s were invited to the Sherbino to view the movie "The Covered Wagon" which commemorated the adventuresome spirit that lead them here. Since the Sherbino opened, folks have gathered to enjoy Chautauqua-style entertainment such as orchestra performances, melodramas, plays, traveling troupes, and educational events. The building has played host to graduations, public meetings, and was used as a roller rink and (for at least one night) a boxing arena. The exterior had a bit part in the 1968 original movie True Grit that included a false porch built onto the addition on rear of the building. At some point the original interior was split into 2 sections. The section with the original doorway (now Colorado Boy's entrance) served as the post office, a drug store, and the Colorado Yurt Company headquarters. The building interior underwent major renovations in the 1970s, again in the early 1990s, and again in 2018. In August 1991 the Sherbino received designation on the Colorado State Register of Historic Places.

With the support of many local residents, The Ridgway Chautauqua Society (RCS, a Colorado non-profit 501c3) is now an owner and steward of two of Ridgway's remaining historic structures - the remodeled Sherbino at 604 Clinton Street, and The 610 Arts Collective at 610 Clinton Street, next door.

=== Water ===
Water plays an important part of local Ridgway culture. The town maintains a marina in a northern inlet of the Ridgway Reservoir. During the warm summer months many tourist and locals take advantage of the Ridgway Reservoir, often wakeboarding or enjoying a day at its beach.

The town also features Orvis Hot Springs, a clothing-optional, natural-hot-springs resort near Ridgway with an indoor, clothing-required pool.

== Notable people ==
- Leslie Chang, journalist
- Charlie Ergen, co-founder and CEO of EchoStar Communications Corporation
- Thomas Friedkin, businessman, Hollywood stunt flyer
- Peter Hessler, non-fiction author, winner of a MacArthur fellowship
- Ralph Lauren, fashion designer and business executive
- PattiSue Plumer - Olympic distance runner and American record holder
- Danny Thompson, race car driver and businessman
- Dennis Weaver, Emmy Award-winning television actor
- Trevor White, Producer

== Transportation ==
The closest airport served by scheduled airlines is Montrose Regional Airport, located 28 miles north. Ridgway is part of Colorado's Bustang network. It is on the Durango-Grand Junction Outrider line.

=== Major highways ===
- U.S. Highway 550 begins 27 miles north of Ridgway, in Montrose. It runs to Bernalillo, New Mexico, near Albuquerque, New Mexico via Durango, Colorado.
- State Highway 62 is a 23.4-mile-long (37.7 km) highway, connecting Ridgway to State Highway 145, near Placerville.

== See also ==
- Communities of Ouray County
- San Juan Skyway National Scenic Byway
