= Dominguez Canyon Wilderness =

Protected area in Colorado, US

- IUCN category Ib (wilderness area)
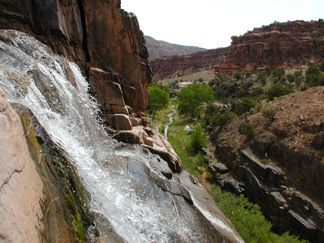
- Dominguez Creek waterfall

- Location within Colorado Location within the United States
- Location: Mesa / Delta counties, Colorado, USA
- Nearest city: Grand Junction, CO
- Coordinates: 38°45′00″N 108°25′00″W
- Area: 66,280 acres (268.2 km^{2})
- Established: 2009
- Governing body: Bureau of Land Management

The Dominguez Canyon Wilderness is a U.S. Wilderness Area located southeast of Grand Junction in western Colorado. The 66,280-acre (268.2 km^{2}) wilderness area established in 2009, the largest BLM roadless area in the state of Colorado, includes two major canyon systems that drain the northeastern corner of the Uncompahgre Plateau. The Wilderness Area is a portion of the larger Dominguez-Escalante National Conservation Area, 209,610-acre (848.3 km^{2}) in size.
