= Escalante Canyon =

- Escalante Canyon (2026)

- Location within Colorado
- Long-axis direction: southwest to northeast

Geography
- Country: United States
- State: Colorado
- Region: Delta, Montrose and Mesa counties
- Coordinates: 38°45′31.94″N 108°15′33.28″W
- Topo map: Dominguez
- Traversed by: Escalante Canyon Road (Road 650)
- River: Escalante Creek
- Interactive map of Escalante Canyon

Escalante Canyon lies within the Dominguez–Escalante National Conservation Area in western Colorado, U.S. The canyon offers interesting geological formations, recreation areas, historic trails and cabins, rare plants, and extreme kayaking.

== Location ==
The canyon lies on the east side of the Uncompahgre Plateau in Delta, Montrose and Mesa counties in Colorado. The western section of the canyon is within the Uncompahgre National Forest, and the eastern section of the canyon is within the Dominguez-Escalante National Conservation Area, an area administered by the United States Bureau of Land Management. The Gunnison River flows past the head of the canyon.

== Description ==
The canyon includes the East Walker Tract of the Escalante State Wildlife Area, the location of the historic Walker Cabin, a stone house early settlers built in 1911. Further up the canyon, a second former dwelling, Captain Smith's Cabin, was also built in 1911 by an early settler.

An Escalante Canyon kayaking site called The Potholes is popular during the spring runoff, when Escalante Creek runs high. The site is suited for extreme kayakers and has Class IV-V rapids.

Within the canyon there is the Escalante Canyon Area of Critical Environmental Concern, which has rare wildflowers including Eastwood's monkeyflower and small-flower columbine.
