= Dallas, Colorado =

Ghost town in Colorado, US

- Ghost town
- Location of Dallas, Colorado. Dallas (Colorado)
- Coordinates: 38°11′00″N 107°44′41″W
- Country: United States
- State: Colorado
- County: Ouray

Government
  - Type: Unincorporated community
  - Body: Ouray County
- Elevation: 6,923 ft (2,110 m)
- Time zone: UTC−07:00 (MST)
  - Summer (DST): UTC−06:00 (MDT)
- ZIP code: Ridgway 81432
- Area codes: 970/748
- GNIS place ID: 188420

Dallas is an extinct town in Ouray County, Colorado, United States. Also known as Dallas City, it lay about 3 miles (4.8 km) north of the present town of Ridgway at the confluence of Dallas Creek and the Uncompahgre River. A community named in tribute to the historic town bearing the name Dallas Meadows now exists near its historic location.

== History ==
Dallas was founded in 1880 and named after the former Vice President of the United States, George M. Dallas, and was a stagecoach stop on a toll road which linked Montrose with Ouray. The Dallas, Colorado, post office operated from February 11, 1884, until October 31, 1899. The Denver & Rio Grande Railroad reached Dallas in 1887 and Dallas was incorporated on April 2, 1889. The new town of Ridgway was founded a year later in 1890 and became the prominent town as Dallas slowly disappeared. The Ridgway, Colorado, post office (ZIP code 81432) now serves the area.

== See also ==
- List of ghost towns in Colorado
