= Mickey Thompson =

American racing driver (1928–1988)

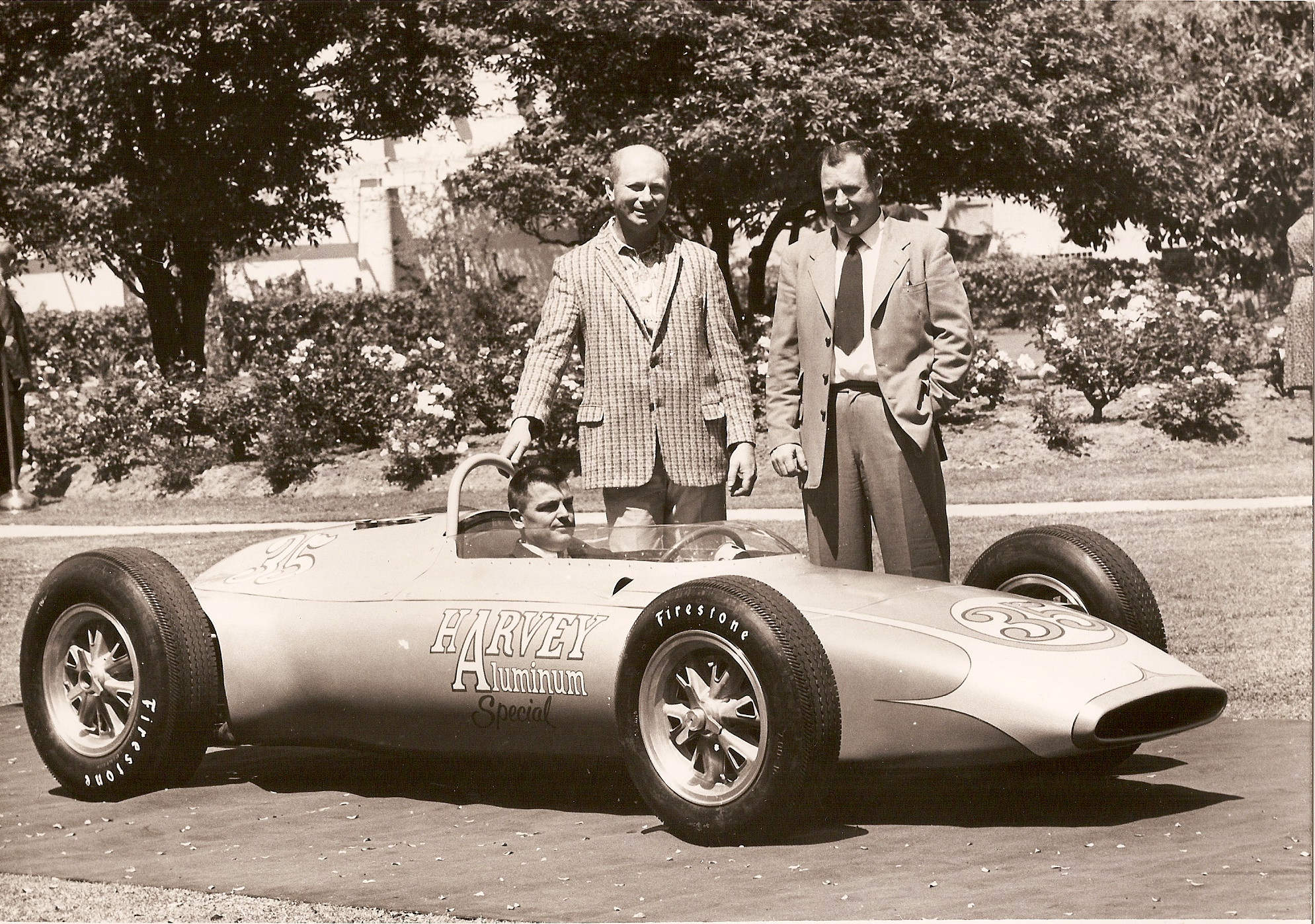
- The 1962 Harvey Aluminium Special Indianapolis 500 car with Thompson (in car), a Harvey representative (on left), and John Crosthwaite (on right)
- Born: Marion Lee Thompson; December 7, 1928; Alhambra, California, U.S.
- Died: March 16, 1988 (aged 59); Bradbury, California, U.S.
- Cause of death: Murder
- Occupation: Race car driver
- Known for: First American to break the 400 mph barrier
- Spouse: Trudy Thompson
- Children: Danny Thompson

Marion Lee "Mickey" Thompson (December 7, 1928 – March 16, 1988) was an American auto racing builder and promoter.

A hot rodder since his youth, Thompson increasingly pursued land speed records in his late 20s and early 30s. He achieved international fame in 1960, when he became the first American to break the 400-mph barrier, driving his Challenger 1 to a one-way top speed of 406.60 mph at the Bonneville Salt Flats and surpassing John Cobb's one-way world record mark of 402 mph.

Thompson then turned to racing, winning many track and dragster championships. In the 1960s, he also entered cars at the Indianapolis 500. Later, he formed off-road racing sanctioning bodies SCORE International and Mickey Thompson Entertainment Group (MTEG).

In 1988, Thompson and his wife Trudy were gunned down at their home in Bradbury, California. The crime remained unsolved until 2007, when a former business partner was convicted of the murders.

== Early life ==
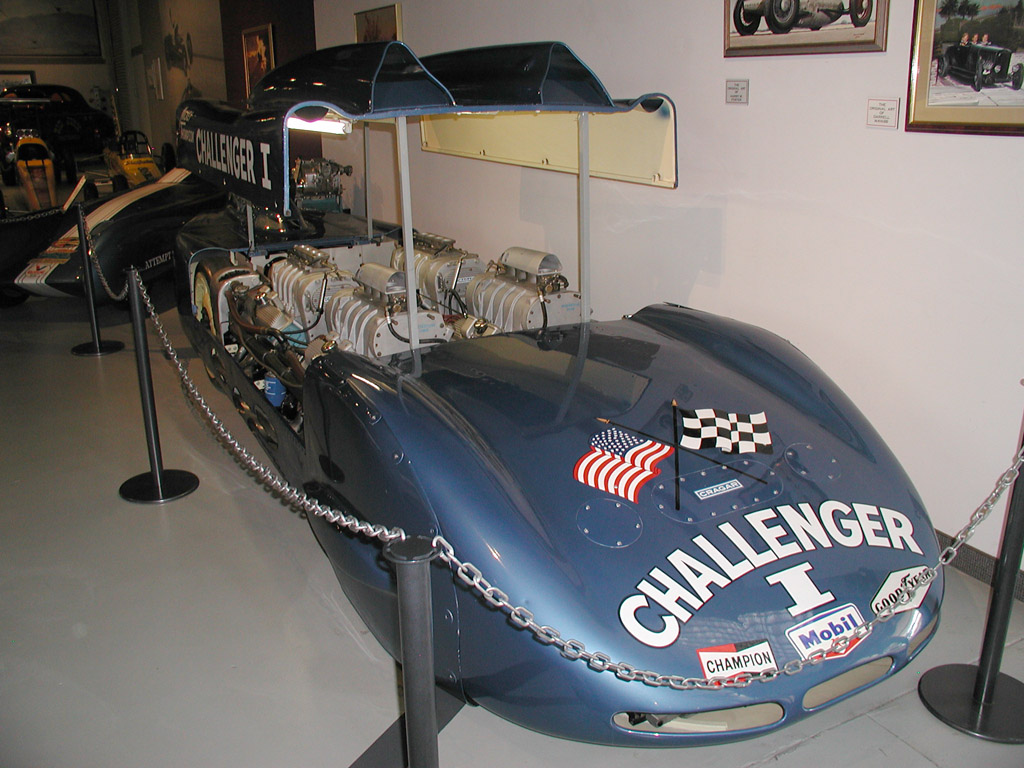
Thompson's record-breaking Challenger I at the NHRA Museum

On December 7, 1928, Thompson was born in Alhambra, California. Thompson's father was Captain Marion L. Thompson, a former police officer with Alhambra Police Department. Thompson's sister is Collene Thompson Campbell.

== Career ==
In his early 20s, Thompson worked as a pressman for the Los Angeles Times while pursuing hot rodding. He later became involved in the new sport of drag racing.

Over the course of his career, Thompson set more speed and endurance records than any other man in automotive history. He is credited with designing and building the first slingshot dragster, in 1954, moving the seat behind the rear axle to improve traction when existing racing tires proved unable to handle the output of increasingly powerful custom engines. This car, the Panorama City Special, debuted at the first NHRA U.S. Nationals at the Great Bend Municipal Airport in Great Bend, Kansas, in 1955. The car ultimately ran a best speed of 151.26 mph (243.43 km/h). A change so momentous would not happen again until Don Garlits introduced the rear-engined digger in 1971. Thompson also was noted for being the first manager of Lions Drag Strip in Wilmington, California, in 1955.

Thompson collaborated with Fritz Voight on a 1958 twin-engined dragster. This car achieved a best speed of 294.117 mph (473.335 km/h). It provided lessons later applied to Challenger I. Determined to set a new land speed record, Thompson achieved fame when he drove his four-engined Challenger 1 at better than 400 mph (640 km/h) in 1960 at the Bonneville Salt Flats, becoming the first American to break that barrier.

== Indianapolis 500s ==
=== 1962 ===
In 1962, Thompson entered three John Crosthwaite-designed cars in the Indianapolis 500. They used a stock block V8 Buick engine, and it was in the rear unlike the front-engined, race-tuned, Offenhauser-powered cars used by most competitors. It was the first stock block engine to be raced at Indy since 1946. Thompson's crew, led by Fritz Voigt, was young, smart, and hard working. Working 12- to 14-hour days, the car was designed and built in 120 days. For the race, the engine (enlarged to 4.2-L capacity, the maximum allowed by the regulations for "stock block" engines) had to be detuned because they were concerned it would not last the distance. Despite being more than 70 bhp down on the other cars, Dan Gurney qualified eighth and was in ninth place until a leaking oil seal seized the gearbox and ended his race on lap 94. He was placed 20th out of 33. The team won the Mechanical Achievement Award for original design, construction, and accomplishment.

=== 1963 ===
Thompson's promotional skills pleased the sponsors with the publicity generated that year. For the 1963 Indianapolis 500, Crosthwaite designed the innovative Harvey Aluminium Special "roller skate car" with the then-pioneering 12 in (300 mm) diameter wheels with smaller-profile racing tires, 7 in (180 mm) wide at the front and 9 in (230 mm) rear. Thompson took five cars to Indianapolis - two of the previous year's design with Chevrolet V8 engines and three roller skate cars. One of the new cars, the Harvey Titanium Special, featured a lightweight titanium chassis. Al Miller raced one of the modified 1962 cars to ninth place despite only qualifying in 31st position. Duane Carter qualified one of the roller skate cars 15th, but was only placed 23rd after an engine failure on the 100th lap. The small tire sizes and low car weights caused complaints among the old hands and owners, so for future races, cars were restricted to minimum tire sizes and minimum car weights.

1962 Formula One World Champion Graham Hill tested one of the roller skate cars at Indianapolis in 1963, but refused to race it, citing its poor handling. The recent ruling required 15-in wheels, but the chassis was designed around smaller wheels. Thompson commented: "The car wouldn't handle", adding, "There was too much body roll due to the high center of gravity."

In 1963, Thompson traveled to England, where, along with Dante Duce, he demonstrated his Ford-powered Harvey Aluminum Special dragster at the Brighton Speed Trials. It was then displayed at the Racing Car Show in London in January 1964.

=== 1964 ===
Thompson brought three modified 12-inch-tired cars to the 1964 Indianapolis 500, but new rules required him to use 15-in tires. The Allstate sponsored team used Allstate tires and Ford engines. The chassis had to be altered to accommodate the larger Ford engines. Two of them qualified for the race. The car No. 84 began the month with Masten Gregory as the driver, but Eddie Johnson in car No. 84 qualified 24th and finished 26th. Dave MacDonald in car No. 83 qualified 14th and died in a fiery crash on the second lap.

=== 1965–1968 ===
Thompson went back to Indy in 1965, but failed to qualify for the 1965 Indianapolis 500 in an attempt with a front-engined roadster. He skipped the 1966 Indianapolis 500, but tried again in 1967 and 1968, but failed to qualify either year. The 1967 attempt used a unique all-wheel drive rear-engined design that steered both front and rear wheels, but Gary Congdon was unable to qualify any of the three cars.

== Post Indy ==
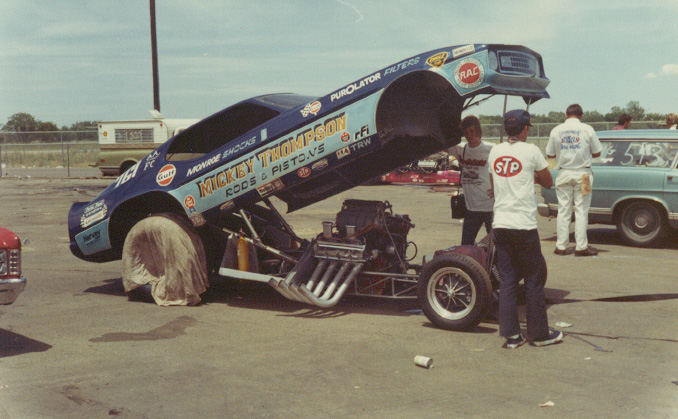
Thompson campaigned a funny car in 1971

In 1965, Thompson published Challenger: Mickey Thompson's own story of his life of Speed. In 1968, he and Danny Ongais took three Ford Mustang Mach 1 to the Bonneville salt flats for a feature in Hot Rod magazine, in the process setting 295 speed and endurance records over a series of 500-mile and 24-hour courses. Together with John Buttera and Pat Foster, developed a Ford Mustang Mach 1 Funny Car with a dragster-like chassis. Driven by Ongais, the car won the 1969 NHRA Spring Nationals at Dallas and the NHRA U.S. Nationals.

In his career, Thompson raced vehicles from stock cars to off-road, and engineered numerous competition engines. He went into the performance aftermarket business in the early 1960s and then, in 1963, he created "Mickey Thompson Performance Tires" that developed special tires for racing including for Indianapolis 500 competitors.

Thompson founded SCORE International in 1973, a sanctioning body to oversee off-road racing across North America. With his wife Trudy he formed the Mickey Thompson Entertainment Group (MTEG), which ran an indoor motocross and off-road vehicle racing show and competition that brought the sport from the back-country to major metropolitan stadiums and arenas.

== Murders ==
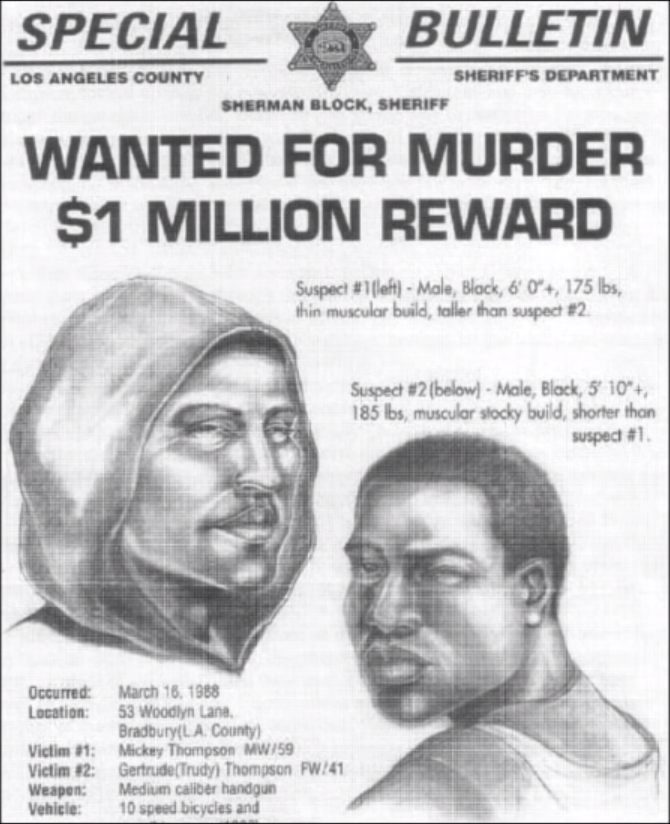
L.A. County Sheriff's Department sketch of Thompson's killers

On March 16, 1988, Thompson and his wife Trudy were murdered by two hooded gunmen outside their home in Bradbury, California.

On the morning of the murder, a pair of unknown assailants waited outside the Thompson home for the couple to leave for the day. Thompson opened the garage door for his wife to pull out in her vehicle and as he headed for his own car, the gunmen attacked. He was shot and wounded then dragged out into the driveway while one of the attackers went after Trudy as she backed out. Killing her, the gunman then came back up the driveway, where the other gunman was watching over Thompson and shot him fatally in the head. The attackers then made their escape on bicycles they had ridden to the residence. Expensive jewelry and a large amount of cash were found on the Thompsons' bodies, eliminating robbery as a likely motive.

A police investigation initially failed to identify the gunmen or a motive for the crime. Police were interested in Thompson's former business partner, Michael Frank Goodwin, who repeatedly refused to pay a more than $768,000 settlement he owed Thompson. Goodwin and his wife bought $275,000 worth of gold coins two months before the Thompsons were murdered and wired $400,000 to banks in Grand Turk Island. Goodwin and his wife then left the US five months after the murder on their yacht and did not return for more than two years.

The case remained unsolved until 2001, when Goodwin was charged in Orange County, California with the murders. Before the trial could be completed, it was ended on jurisdictional grounds by the California District Court of Appeal. On June 8, 2004, Goodwin was charged with the murders in Pasadena, in Los Angeles County. In October 2006, a Pasadena Superior Court judge ordered Goodwin to stand trial.

During the trial, several witnesses reported hearing Goodwin threaten to kill the Thompsons. "I’m going to kill that son of a bitch. I’m going to kill that motherfucker. I’m going to take out Mickey. I’m too smart to get caught. I’ll have him wasted. He’ll never see a nickel. I’ll kill him first. Mickey doesn’t know who he is fucking with. He is fucking dead."

On January 4, 2007, the jury found Goodwin guilty of two counts of murder in the death of Thompson and his wife. Goodwin was sentenced to two consecutive life-without-parole terms. A subsequent motion for a new trial was denied. In the 2015 California 2nd District Court of Appeal ruling, although no direct evidence connected Goodwin to the case, the array of circumstantial evidence was found to be "overwhelming". The two men who murdered the Thompsons have not been located.

TV coverage and its fictionalization through the television program CSI, were cited by the defense team during the murder trial as having created a "folklore" around the case, preventing a fair trial.

== In popular culture ==
- CBS's To Tell The Truth. Appeared as a contestant in March 1962
- NBC's Unsolved Mysteries
- Investigation Discovery's Murder Book.
- CBS television program 48 Hours Mystery April 28, 2007
- CSI episode "Early Rollout" (2004) was based on this murder case.
- Netflix's Homicide: Los Angeles details murder case in Episode 2.

== Awards ==
- Thompson was inducted posthumously to the Motorsports Hall of Fame of America
- 1990 Inducted to International Motorsports Hall of Fame.
- Thompson was ranked No. 11 on the National Hot Rod Association Top 50 Drivers, 1951–2000
- Thompson was inducted posthumously to the Off-Road Motorsports Hall of Fame in 2007, and the Automotive Hall of Fame in 2009.

== See also ==
- Semon Knudsen
- Stadium Super Trucks, a racing series inspired by Thompson's stadium off-road racing

== Additional sources ==
- Taylor, Thom. "Beauty Beyond the Twilight Zone" in Hot Rod, April 2017, pp. 30–43.
