= Communities of Ouray County =

A List of Communities in Ouray County.

== Communities ==
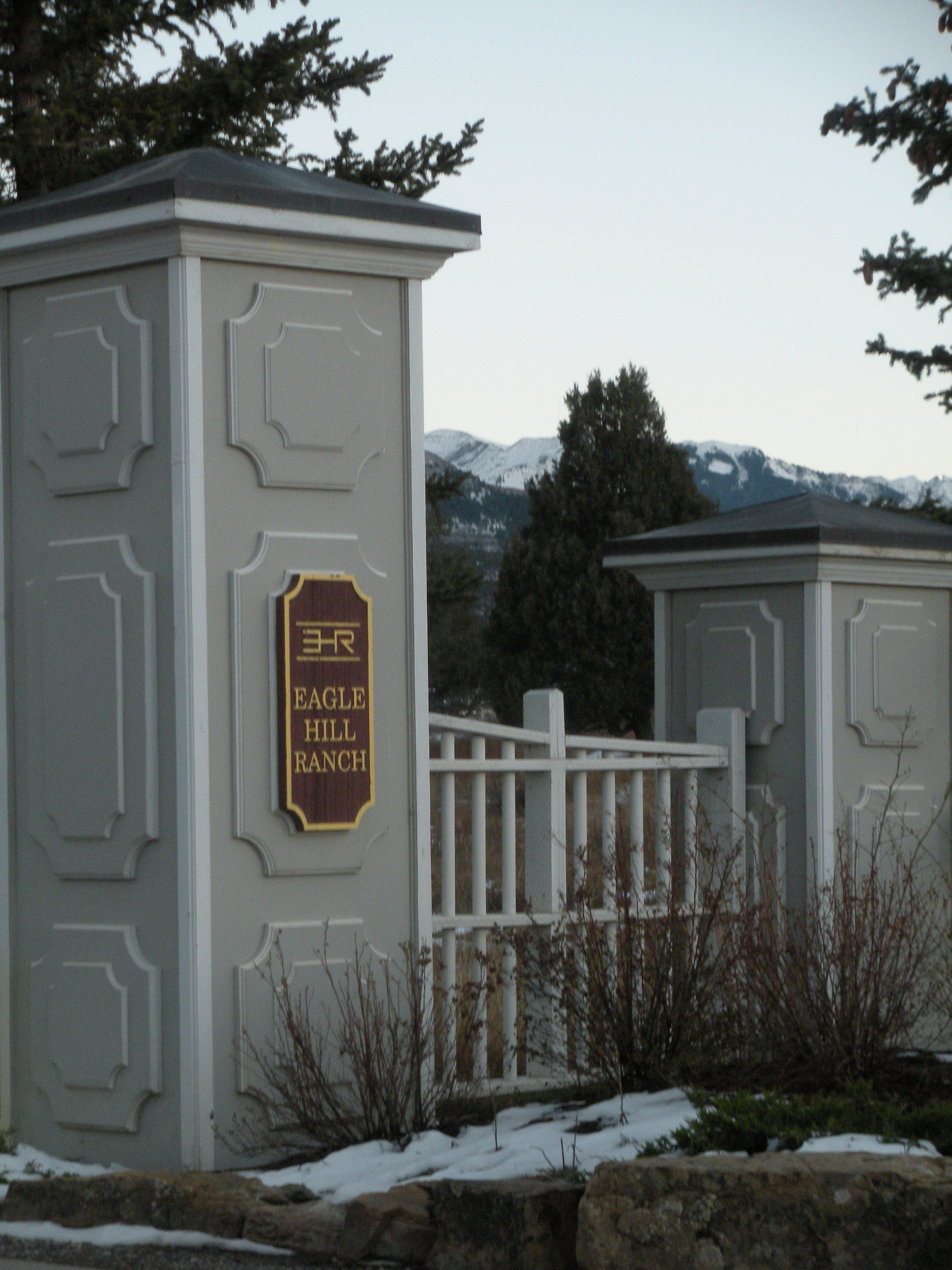
Gate to Eagle Hill Ranch

- Cimarron Mesa - A Log Hill Mesa residential community on the northern slopes of the mesa.
- Dallas Meadows - A community on a relatively flat region of the valley just north of Eagle Hill and bordering the Uncompahgre River.
- Eagle Hill Ranch - A relatively affluent populous dwelling on a large hill north of the town of Ridgway. Commonly referred to by the hill which it is on, Eagle Hill, the community is considered the premier development outside of the Ridgway city limits by the town itself. Eagle Hill maintains private trails and relatively large scenic pond. There are many vantage points within the community to view the Sneffels Range.
- Fairway Pines - An affluent golf course community located in Loghill Village.
- Mountain Shadow East - A planned residential community located in the South Slope region of Ouray County. Mountain Shadow is on the southern slope of Log Hill Mesa
- Riversage - A new community to Ouray County, River Sage is so named for its location on the Uncompahgre River and abundance of sagebrush. The development has in its boundaries a memorial for late actor Dennis Weaver who had a home and family in the region. River Sage is just north of Ridgway and east of Eagle Hill Ranch
- River Park - A residential community in northern Ridgway south of Eagle Hill.
- Solar Ranch - A residential community in southern Ridgway with a recreation center.
- Vista Terrace - A community east in the town of Ridgway, Vista Terrace is a development on the south face of a large hill in the valley facing the San Juan Mountains and also offers excellent views.
