= Danny Thompson (racing driver) =

American racing driver (born 1948)

- Born: October 28, 1948 (age 78)
- Occupation: Race car driver
- Father: Mickey Thompson (died 1988)

Danny P. Thompson (born October 28, 1948) is an American race car driver and the son of the late motorsports entrepreneur Mickey Thompson.

Thompson began his career at the age of nine, winning his first quarter-midget championship one year later. He moved on to motocross and Formula Atlantic cars in his teens, before graduating to sprint cars and stadium trucks later in life. He took control of the Mickey Thompson Entertainment Group after the murders of his step-mother and father. He left the industry in 1996 following the company's bankruptcy.

In 2003, Thompson succeeded in joining his father in the Bonneville 200 MPH Club. He became the driver of the world's fastest production Ford Mustang in 2008, and in 2016 used a restored and updated version of Mickey's 1968 prototype streamliner the Challenger 2 to capture the SCTA unblown fuel streamliner record with an average speed of 406.7 mph.

Thompson is responsible for the restoration and exhibition of many historically significant racing vehicles.
