= Thompson-Voight dragster =

Overview
- Designer: Mickey Thompson and Fritz Voight

Body and chassis
- Class: Top Fuel
- Body style: Streamliner dragster

Powertrain
- Engine: Twin 392 cu in (6,420 cc) Chrysler hemis

The Thompson-Voight dragster is a twin-engined streamliner dragster.

Mickey Thompson collaborated with Fritz Voight in building the dragster, which had a fully enclosed body (except the steel front wheels), including a closed canopy. It was powered by a pair of 392 cu in (6,420 cc) Chrysler hemis, one facing forward to drive the rear wheels, the other facing backward to drive the front ones.

Wearing number 555, the car debuted in 1958 at Bonneville, after "an impromptu stop", where it achieved 242 mph (389 km/h) on its very first run.

The next week, the car turned in a best speed of 294.117 mph (473.335 km/h), but broke a connecting rod, leaving Thompson unable to back up his speed to make it official.

While a reasonable success in land speed racing, the car proved too slow for drag racing, never able to top high-9 second passes or 149.50 mph (240.60 km/h) (even with its body removed), when contemporary slingshot fuellers were routinely hitting mid-9s.
