= John Crosthwaite =

English race car designer and engineer

John Crosthwaite (9 October 1925 – 5 September 2010) was an English race car designer and engineer, active in both the United Kingdom and the United States.

Crosthwaite worked with Cooper Cars, Colin Chapman at Team Lotus and Mickey Thompson as well as drivers Graham Hill, Dan Gurney and Jackie Stewart. He designed and built cars for Formula Junior and the 1962 and 1963 Indianapolis 500. A chassis specialist, he worked at Formula 1 team BRM and later drew up chassis for the Intermeccanica Italia, the Bond Bug and the Reliant Scimitar GTE road cars.

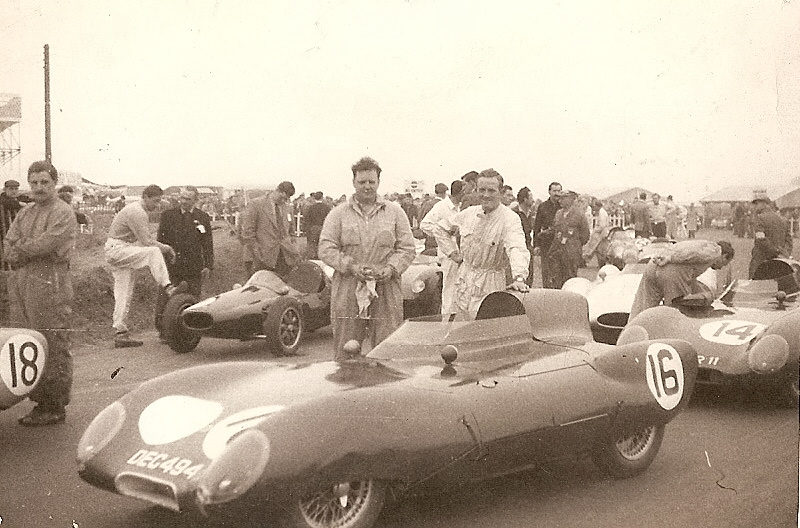
Lotus Elevens at 1956 British Grand Prix, Silverstone, for the Formula 2 race. Crosthwaite holding cloth. Driver car no.16, Cliff Allison leaning on car. Driver car no.18, Graham Hill standing on left. Race winner Roy Salvadori standing with foot on tyre of the Cooper T41. Colin Chapman finished second in Lotus number 14

== Early life ==
John Crosthwaite was born at Thornaby Hall, Thornaby-on-Tees, Yorkshire on 9 October 1925. He was godson to Harold Macmillan, a family friend and local MP. He had three older sisters and a younger brother. His father, Cedric, was in the Royal Flying Corps in World War I and raced cars and motorcycles. Crosthwaite had a fascination with cars, motorbikes and aeroplanes from an early age. At 14 years of age he was helping to rebuild a crash damaged Invicta. In 1928, his parents separated. He was raised by his mother and his oldest sister Barbara.

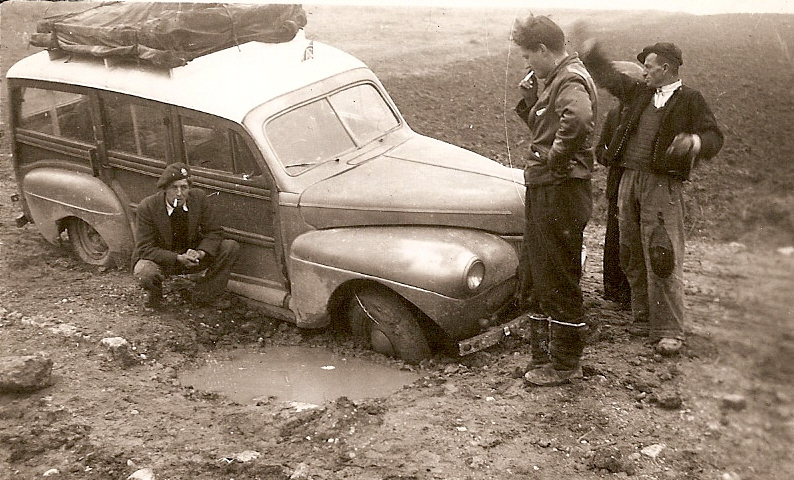
Crosthwaite, standing third from right, examining his Ford Mercury with its front wheel in a mine hole. Greece 1949

During World War II he worked at A.V. Roe & Co (Avro) doing final assembly of Lancaster Bombers. Despite being in a reserved occupation he tried to join the RAF but during the medical discovered he was colour blind. He continued to volunteer for other services until AV Roe finally released him in 1943 to join the Royal Marines. In 1944, he was accepted in the Royal Marine Commandos.

Following the end of the war in the far east,Crosthwaite remained in the Royal Marine Commandos until 1947. He left to join the police force for a short period but he could not settle. He was offered a job in Malaya and as an adventure decided to travel overland. Crosthwaite bought a 1944 Canadian Mercury V8 estate ex War Dept. and along with a friend travelled through France, Italy, then steamer to Greece. They encountered bandits, civil war in Greece, fuel shortages, mines and mine holed roads. They found a way across the closed border to Istanbul, Turkey, where they were arrested and interrogated. On release, they crossed into Syria through Damascus, then via Baghdad to Basra in Iraq and finally Ahvaz, Iran. Because of the awful state of the roads and despite ongoing repairs, the vehicle finally gave up. His friend joined the Iraq Petroleum Company but Crosthwaite returned home.

== Career ==
=== Cooper Car Company - Tommy Sopwith ===
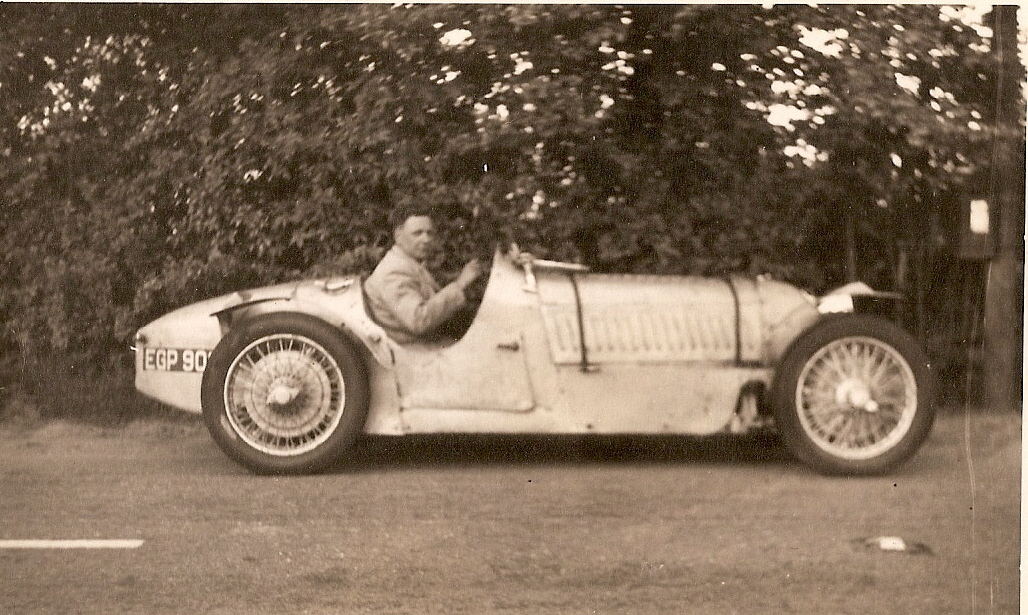
Crosthwaite in his 1937 1100cc Alta

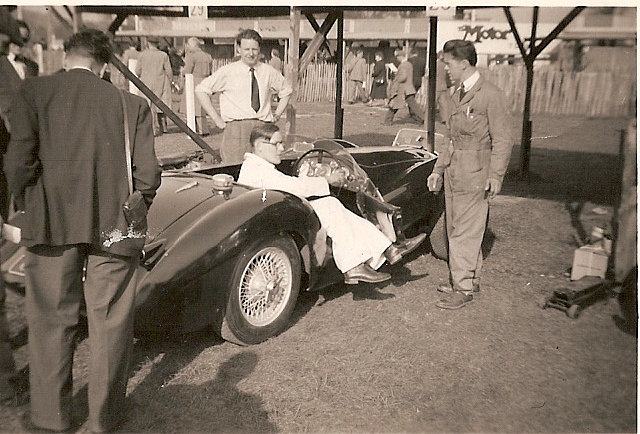
Tommy Sopwith's 'Equipe Endeavour' Sphinx Allard at Goodwood May 1954. Crosthwaite, hands on hips, supervising.

On his return to Britain, Crosthwaite went to work as an apprentice at Armstrong Siddeley and studied for the National Certificate in Engineering at Coventry Technical College in the evenings. Any spare time was spent buying, driving and reconditioning neglected cars including a 1937 1100 cc Alta. In 1952, he met Tommy Sopwith, son of Sir Thomas Sopwith, who was also doing a short apprenticeship at his father's factory. They got on well, and as Sopwith was interested in sports car racing and knew Crosthwaite was knowledgeable about cars, he asked Crosthwaite to be his mechanic. Initially they used an Armstrong Siddeley 3.4-litre 6-cylinder Sapphire engine, Allard JR chassis and preselector gearbox. Sopwith won races at Davidstow, Silverstone and Snetterton in the Sphinx Allard. Sopwith called his team Equipe Endeavour after his father's America's Cup racing yacht.

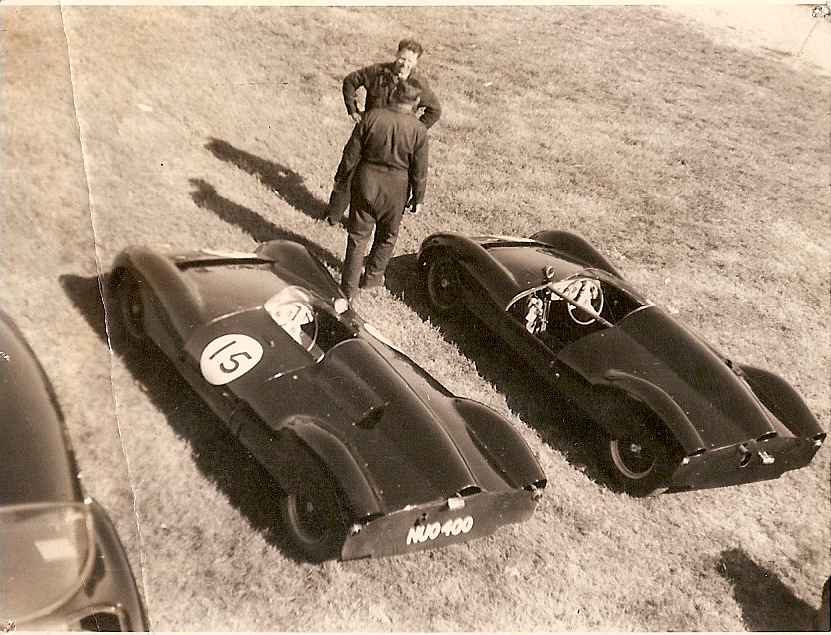
Equipe Endeavour Cooper T39/Climax cars Goodwood 30 May 1955. Crosthwaite facing cars

In 1954, Sopwith decided to expand Equipe Endeavour with some friends and ordered cars from Coopers. From early 1954 to late 1955, Crosthwaite worked with John Cooper of Cooper Cars supervising production and final design of Equipe Endeavour sports cars on Sopwith's behalf. Whilst at Cooper's, he worked with Ivor Bueb, Roy Salvadori, Ken Tyrrell and Jack Brabham. Crosthwaite did the rounds of the manufacturers to find suitable engines and decided on a Coventry Climax (which he had seen on a front-engined Kieft) for low weight and small size, and a Connaught engine for power and compactness. He found the people at Coventry Climax keen to develop their engine and increase bhp. Sopwith won races at several circuits, including Goodwood, with the bobtail Cooper Climax and broke the class record at Prescott hill climb. Reg Parnell and Ivor Bueb raced for the team at several meetings. Crosthwaite was therefore in at the beginning of and influenced by the multi-cylinder rear-engined revolution in motor racing.

Because of Equipe Endeavour's success, Crosthwaite was approached by other teams and drivers but he was quite happy with Tommy. However at the end of the 1955 season at Oulton Park, Tommy had an accident, rolled his Cooper Climax and was quite badly hurt after he 'overcooked it' on one of the corners. Tommy's father told him he could continue racing but only in saloon cars. Crosthwaite did not want to work in saloon car racing so he thanked Tommy and decided to move on. Whilst racing at Aintree, Crosthwaite had met a young lady, Joan, and was smitten. They married in April 1955 and with a baby on the way he needed to support his family so tried to decide on the best team to join.

=== Lotus Engineering ===
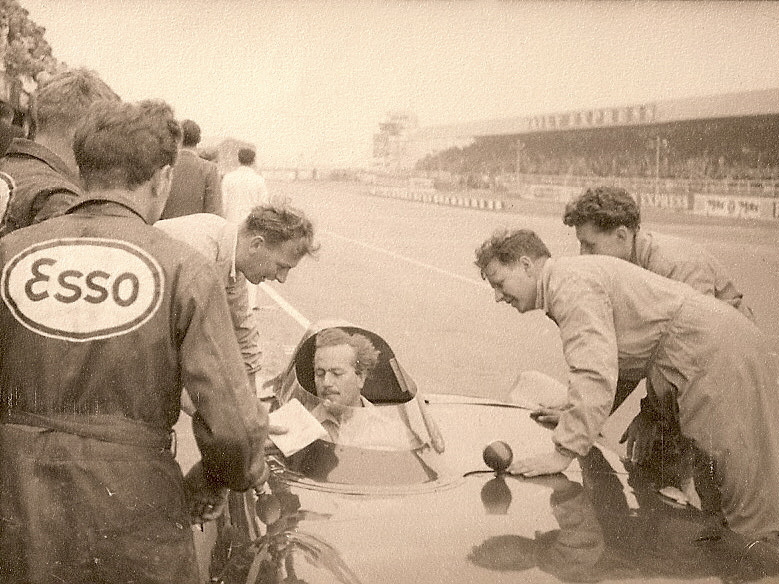
Colin Chapman in Lotus 11 at British Grand Prix, Formula 2 Race, Silverstone July 1956. Crosthwaite on right, leaning on car. Mike Costin on left holding notes

In autumn 1955, Crosthwaite joined Colin Chapman who was starting Lotus cars. Crosthwaite worked in the Experimental Department at Lotus Engineering and helped develop and refine the Lotus 11 and Type 14 Elite. He also acted as Chapman's senior racing mechanic and they competed all over the UK, as well as Le Mans, Imola and Monza. He worked alongside Graham Hill, then a gearbox mechanic and Mike Costin, the 'Cos' in Cosworth. Keith Duckworth (the 'worth' in Cosworth) worked there during holidays from university. Cliff Allison was their most successful driver at that time.

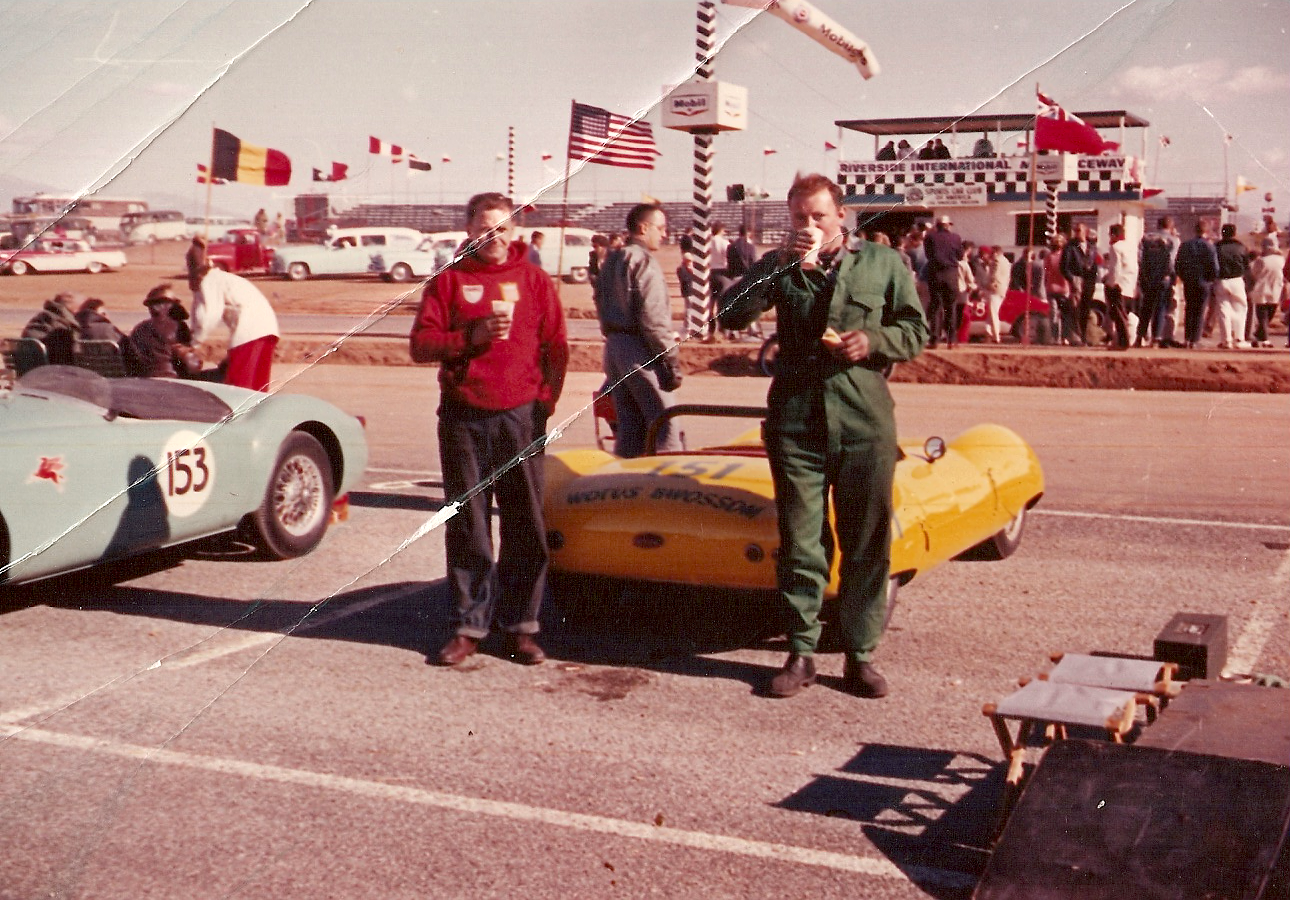
Crosthwaite (left) standing in front of Leon Miller's yellow Lotus Eleven. Blue MGA on left. Riverside Raceway SCCA race meeting 17 November 1957

In late 1956, the Suez Crisis meant that petrol was rationed in the UK and motor racing banned. Colin Chapman asked if Crosthwaite would go to the US with Team Lotus as he needed a senior mechanic to prepare the Lotus cars for the Sebring 12-hour race in March 1957. Chapman finished first in class. Following the race, Crosthwaite went to work for Jay Chamberlain the Lotus importer in California. He also found a lot of work successfully preparing Coopers and Lotus cars for races in California and Nevada. The drivers he worked for included John Biehl, Frank Monise, Ignacio Lozano, Jock Ross, Leon Miller, and Skip Conklin. There were always a couple of sports / racing cars in the garage or on the drive. He attended race meetings to modify and fine tune the cars for races at Pomona, Riverside, Palm Springs, Santa Barbara, San Diego, Torrey Pines and Laguna Seca.

=== Dolphin Engineering ===
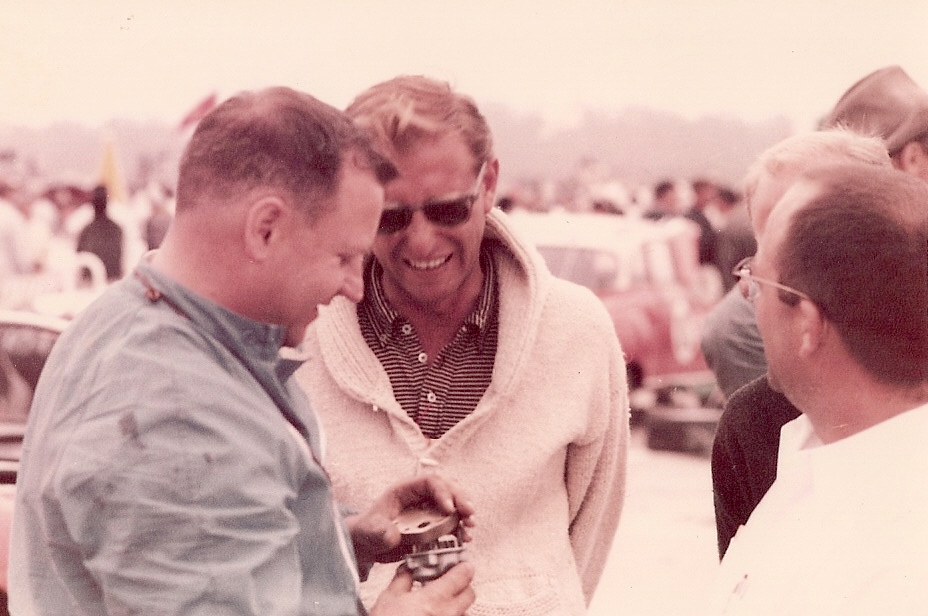
Crosthwaite (left) with drivers John Biehl (sunglasses) and Frank Monise (glasses) at Riverside in June 1958

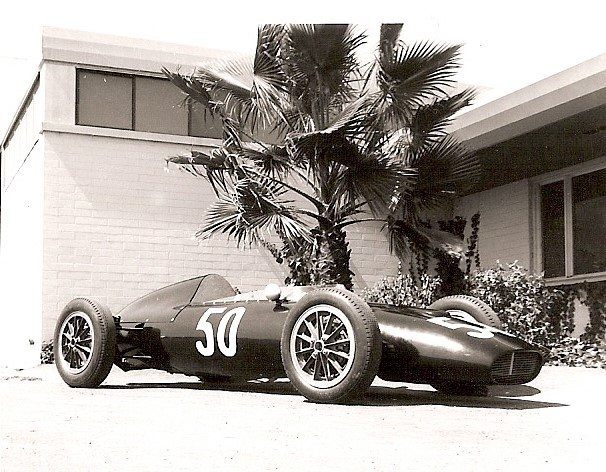
Dolphin Mk 2

Crosthwaite on left. Buddy Hull on right. 1959 and 1960 Formula 1 World Champion Jack Brabham sitting in Dolphin Mk 1. Riverside Raceway 1960

Early in 1959, racing driver John Biehl introduced Crosthwaite to anglophile and race car enthusiast Buddy Hull. Buddy had come into some money and was very keen to get involved in building race cars himself. They started as a partnership, Hull as MD and financier and Crosthwaite to design and build a Formula Junior for their company "Dolphin Engineering". This was a single seater mid-engined car with a fibreglass body. The regulations stated that the car's engine/gearbox were based on a production car of 1100cc or less. The chassis, suspension and bodywork were unrestricted. The chassis was a straight tubular steel space frame. The engine was a 1100cc Fiat and the gearbox an inverted Fiat 600. It had pressed steel wheels and the fibreglass body was made with the advice of a local boatbuilder. The front suspension and brakes were modified parts from a non-runner NSU Prinz that Crosthwaite had. The rear suspension he designed and manufactured himself.

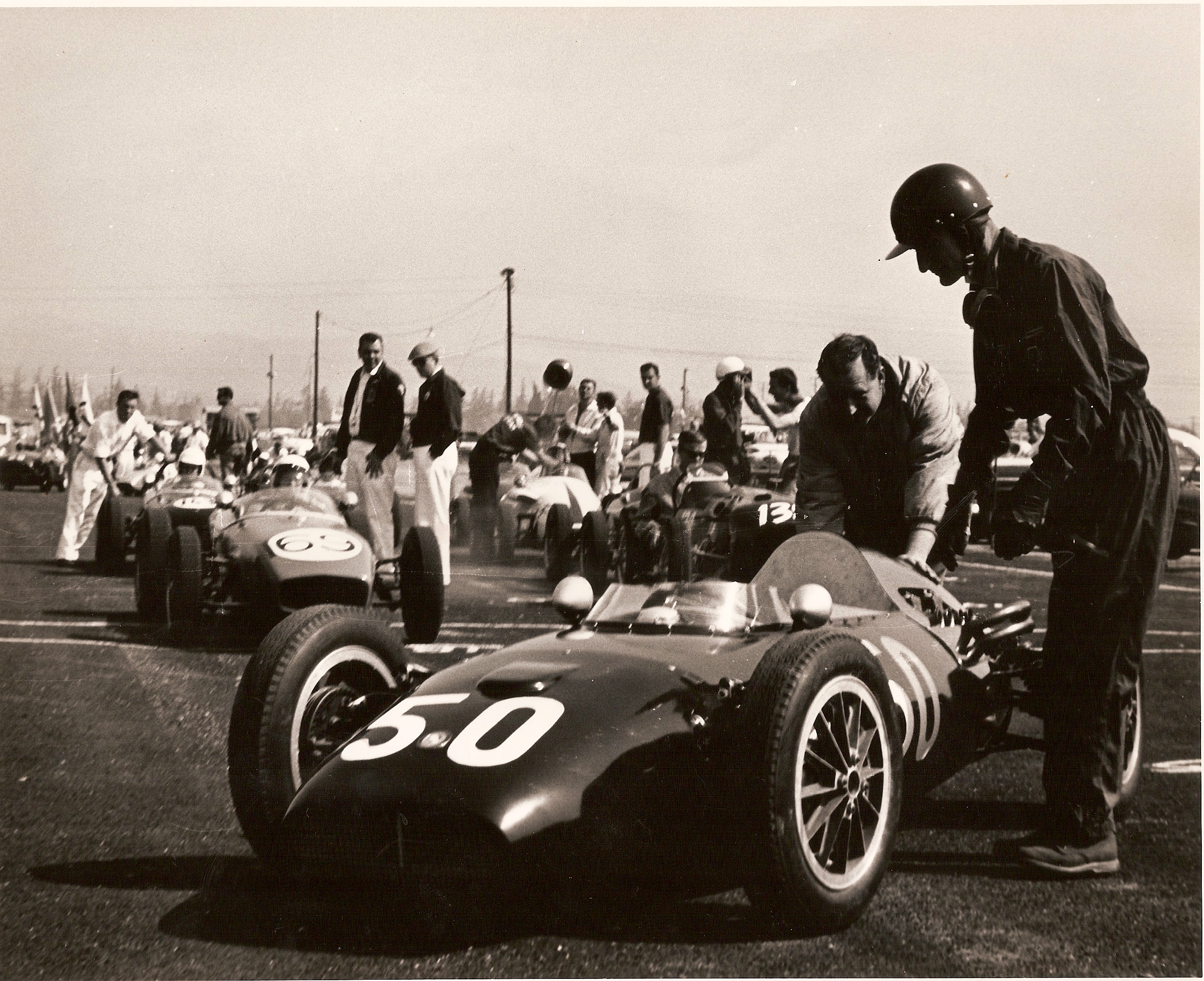
Dolphin Mk 2 debut at Pomona in March 1961. Crosthwaite behind car. Driver Ken Miles finished second.

Late in 1959, the prototype was raced at San Diego and finished 5th. They decided to tidy up the prototype and go into production with the Mk 1 Dolphin. This tidying up turned into a lot more than that so the only thing left of the prototype was the basic chassis frame and bodywork. Formula One World Champion Jack Brabham test drove the Mk 1 Dolphin at Riverside International Raceway

Because of the increasingly competitive Formula Junior market, Crosthwaite decided to design a Dolphin Mk 2 in 1961 (also called the Dolphin International). Twenty six were produced. It had a tuned 997cc Ford Anglia 105E engine sourced from Mike Costin of Cosworth in the UK. The new body was drawn to be as small, smooth and aerodynamic as possible. After all the hours spent making Mk 1 body moulds, they decided to produce a master 'plug' made of aluminium for the fibreglass body of the Mk 2. This 'plug' was produced to Crosthwaite's specification by the local racecar body shop of Troutman and Barnes. Dolphin Engineering tooled up with jigs for all the welded parts and Crosthwaite designed cast magnesium wheels for the car. The Mk2 was successfully raced by ex pat Ken Miles (a close second place on its debut). Kurt Neumann won in a Dolphin International at Riverside in June 1962. Count Giovanni Lurani, who was instrumental in persuading the FIA to make Formula Junior an international class, described the Dolphin as the best American Junior constructed. Original Dolphin cars are still raced today at historic car events.

=== Indianapolis 500 - Mickey Thompson ===
==== 1962 Indianapolis 500 ====
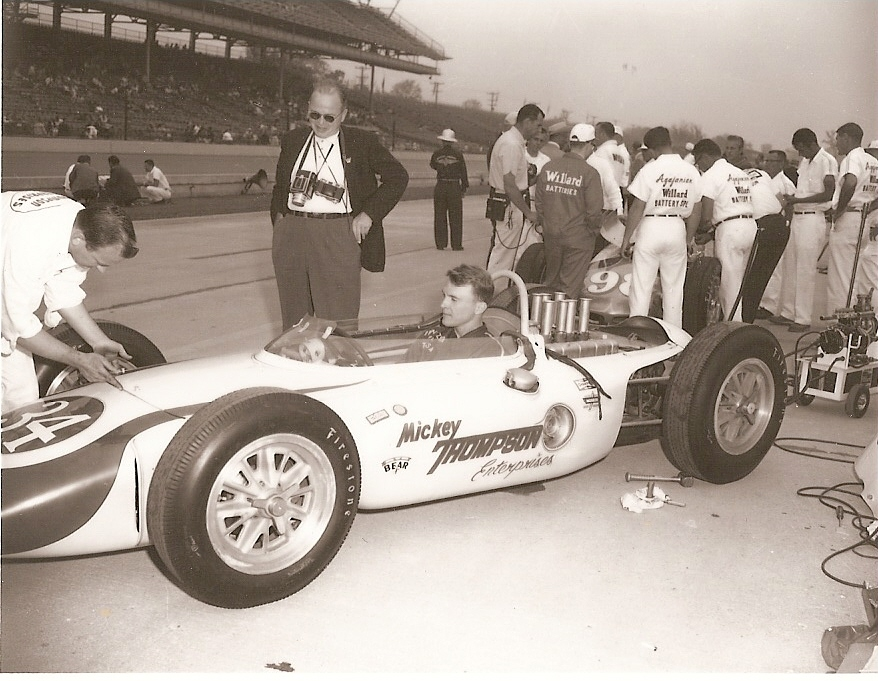
Crosthwaite (left) working on the 1962 car while Dan Gurney waits in car for next practice run

Crosthwaite with chassis of 1962 Indianapolis 500 car. Mickey Thompson machine shop, Long Beach, California 1962

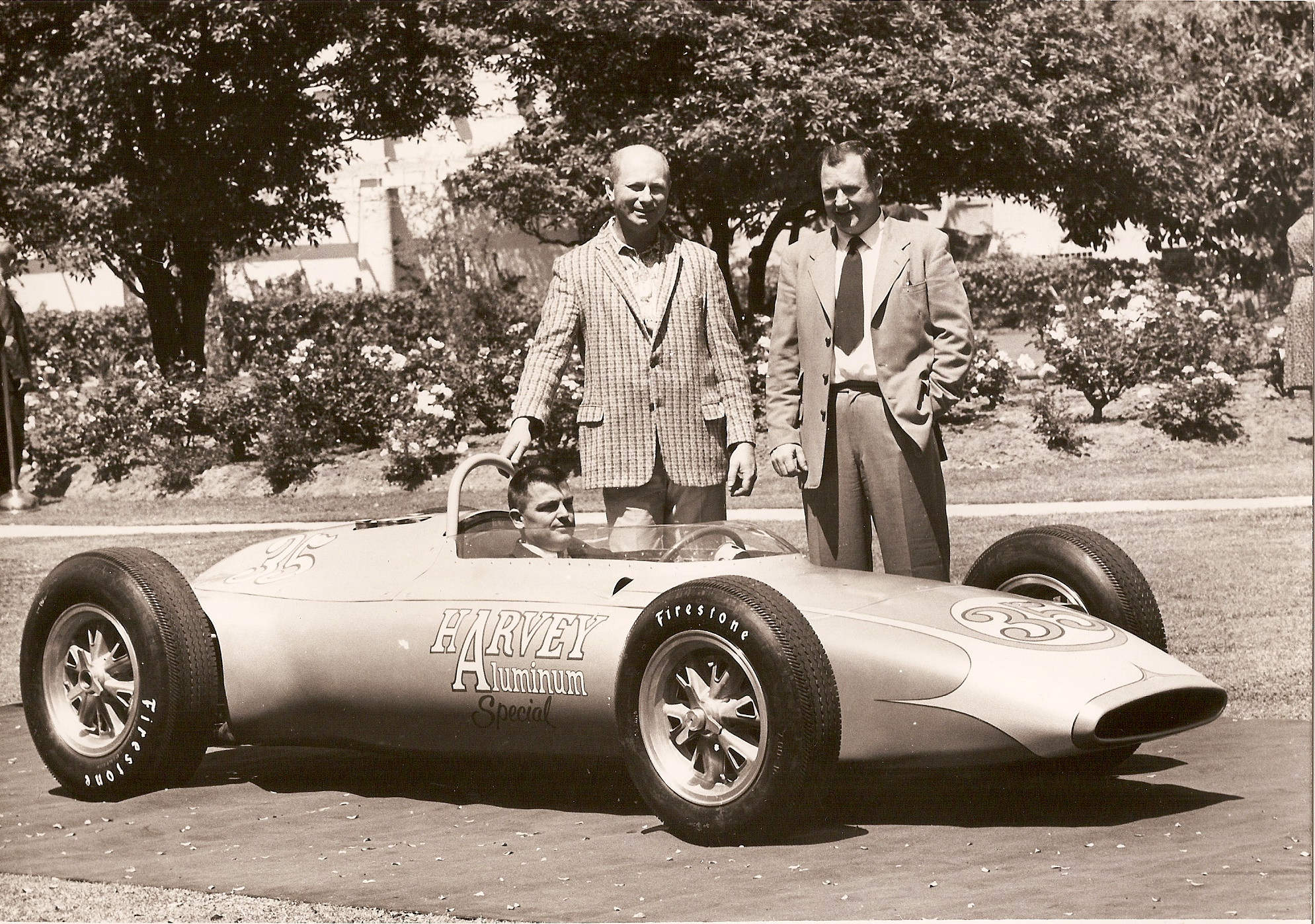
The chassis in picture above with bodywork. 1962 Harvey Aluminium Special Indianapolis 500 car. Mickey Thompson in car. Standing, Harvey representative on left, Crosthwaite on right

Following the achievements of the Dolphin, Crosthwaite came to the attention of Mickey Thompson, who was well known for involvement in drag racing, land speed record attempts and motor racing. Thompson and his sponsors, Harvey Aluminium and Jim Kimberly (of Kimberly Clark), asked Crosthwaite to design a car to race in the 1962 Indianapolis 500. Unusually, they used a stock V8 Buick engine and it was in the rear unlike the front-engined, race tuned, Offenhauser powered cars used by most competitors. It was the first stock engine to be raced at Indy since 1946 and was the beginning of the rear engine transformation at the Indianapolis 500. The car had 16-inch wheels instead of the usual 18"/20" seen at Indy and fully independent suspension. The only thing in common with the Dolphin was the NSU lower front suspension trunion. Thompson's crew led by Fritz Voigt were young, smart and hard working. Working 12-14-hour days, the car was designed and built in 120 days. Crosthwaite lived in a local motel and was rarely home. For the race, the engine (enlarged to 4.2-litre capacity, the maximum allowed by the regulations for "stock block" engines) had to be detuned because they were concerned it would not last the distance. Despite being more than 70 bhp down on the other cars, Dan Gurney qualified eighth and was in ninth place until a leaking oil seal seized the gearbox and ended his race on lap 94. He was placed 20th out of 33. The team won the Mechanical Achievement Award for original design, construction and accomplishment.

==== 1963 Indianapolis 500 ====
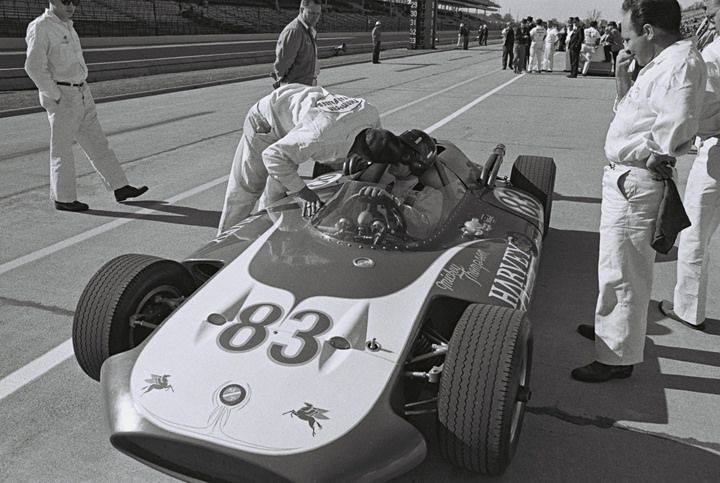
Graham Hill testing'roller skate'Indy 500 car May 1963. Crosthwaite standing behind car.

The sponsors were very pleased with the publicity generated that year so for the 1963 Indianapolis 500 Crosthwaite produced the innovative Harvey Aluminium Special 'roller skate car' with the then pioneering smaller profile (12-inch diameter) and wide racing tyres (front 7 inches and rear 9 inches wide) and wheels. Because of the small size of the front wheels Crosthwaite had to work out a way to mount the front brakes inboard in order to get a reasonable size disc. It was the first time that this had been attempted. Mickey Thompson took five cars to Indianapolis. Two of the previous year's design with Chevrolet V8 engines and three 'roller skate' cars. One of the new cars, the Harvey Titanium Special, featured a lightweight titanium chassis. Formula 1 World Champion Graham Hill test drove one of the cars but decided not to race because commitments in Europe meant he had insufficient time to practice. Al Miller raced one of the modified 1962 cars to 9th place despite only qualifying in 31st position. Duane Carter qualified one of the roller skate cars 15th but was only placed 23rd after an engine failure on the 100th lap. The small tyre sizes and low car weights caused complaints amongst the old hands and owners, so for future races cars were restricted to minimum tyre sizes and minimum car weight.

=== Holman Moody ===
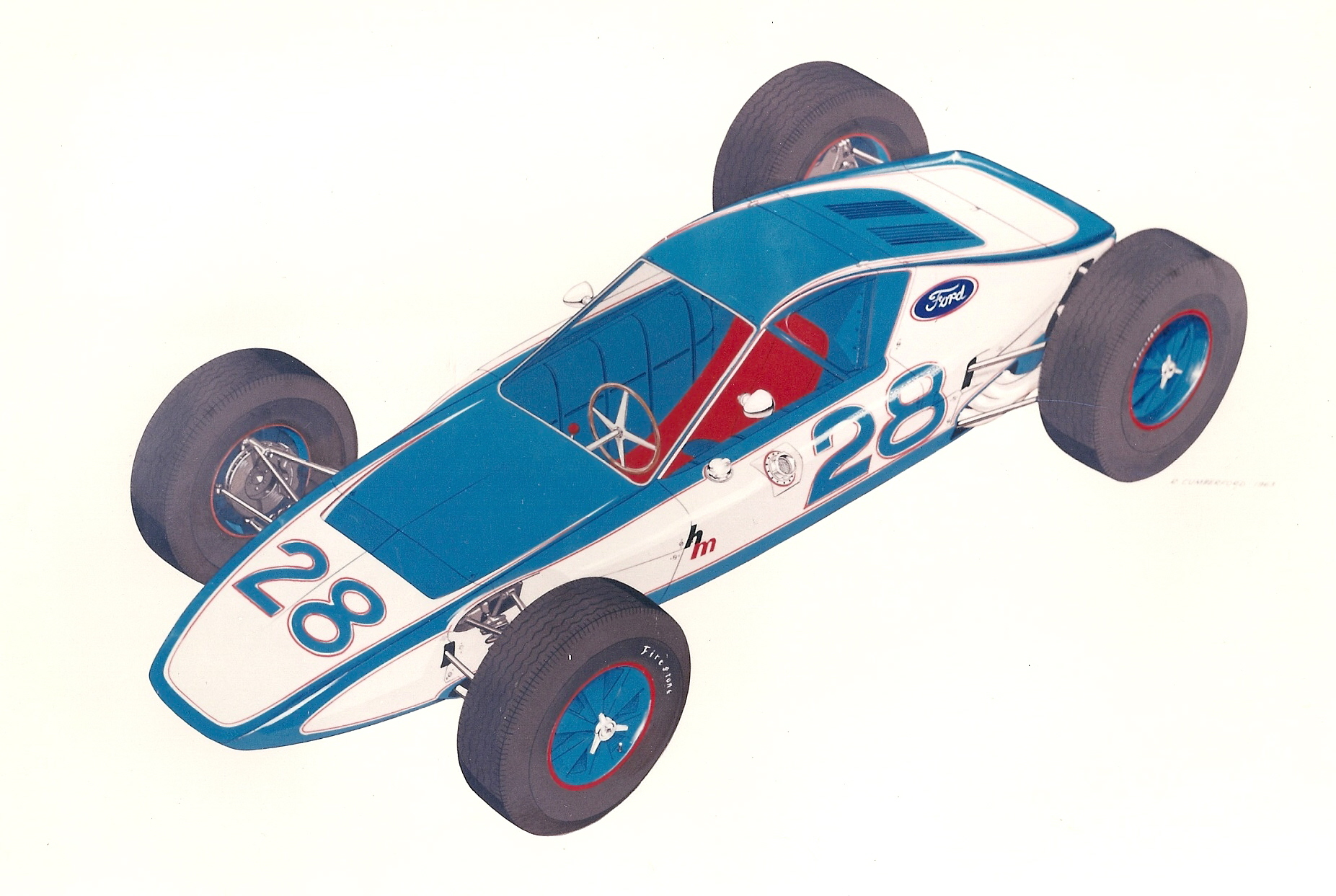
Unused initial design for Holman Moody Indianapolis 500 car. late 1963

Soon after the Indy 500 race, in early July 1963, Crosthwaite was approached by and moved to work at Holman Moody, the official race contractor for Ford. Ford wanted Holman Moody to submit a proposal to run an Indianapolis 500 car for 1964. North Carolina was far enough from Los Angeles so he would not tread on Mickey Thompson's toes. He wanted to work with Ford as they were by far the best engines and they were working on a real race engine, not a modified stock. Jim Clark had finished second that year using a Ford engine. Holman Moody were keen for Crosthwaite to start straight away so they could quote a price for Ford.

Crosthwaite drew up a chassis using some of the body panels as stressed members, semi-monocoque with the possibility of using a windscreen and enclosed cockpit. However, ironically, soon after he arrived he found that Mickey Thompson had abandoned General Motors and managed to obtain the Ford sponsorship based on Mickey's 1962/3 performance (with Crosthwaite designed/built cars) and promotional skills. There was no work at Holman Moody in race cars but they suggested Crosthwaite could work on their racing boats.

=== BRM - British Racing Motors ===
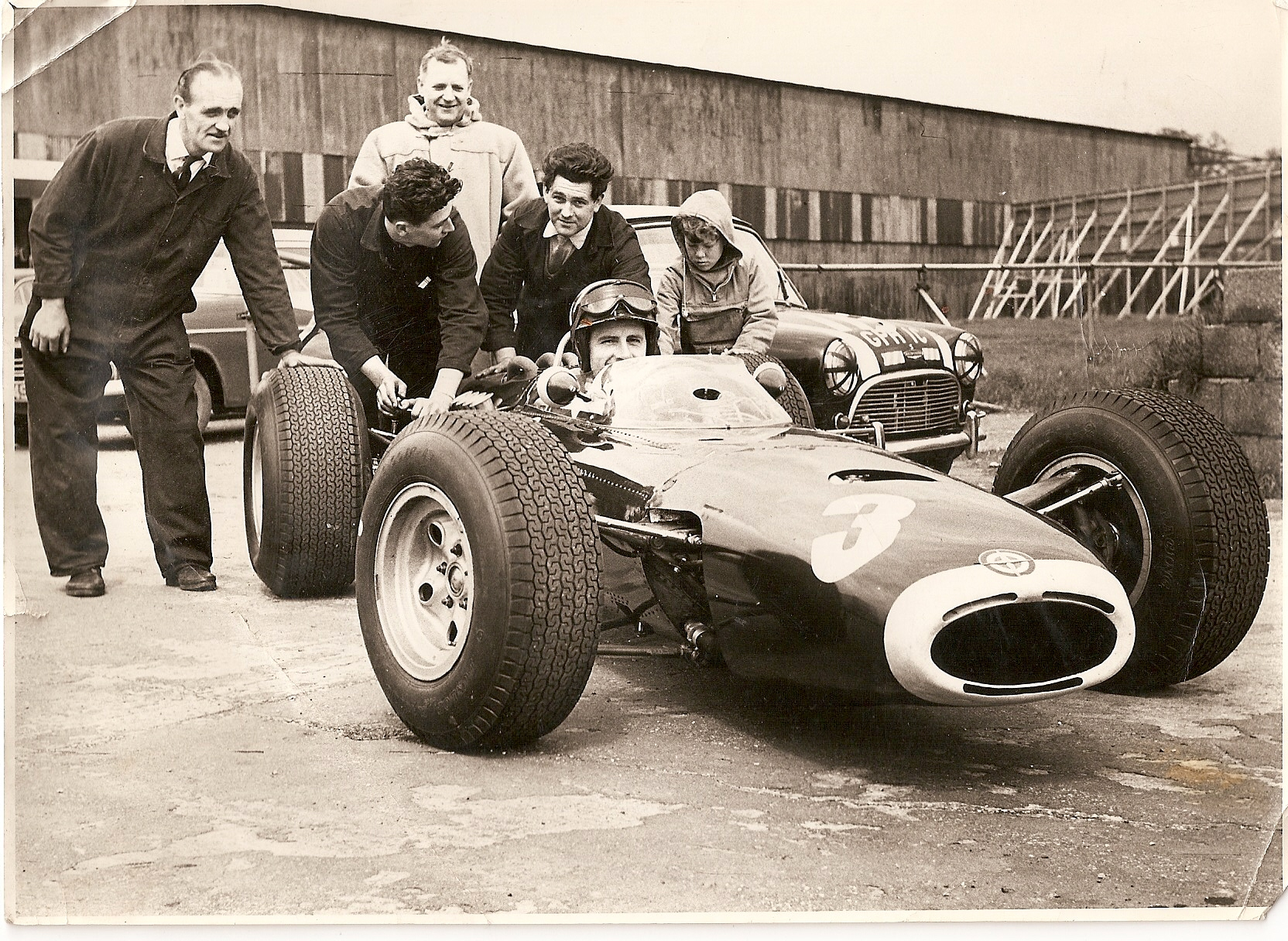
Graham Hill testing the BRM P261 in 1965. Crosthwaite in duffel coat

While he had been at Holman Moody, Crosthwaite had a phone call from Tony Rudd Chief Engineer at BRM asking him to go to Watkins Glen race track in New York State (the US Grand Prix was held there on 6 October 1963). Tony said that Graham Hill wanted Crosthwaite to join BRM and would he like to meet up and discuss details? Crosthwaite said he was busy at the time but when the Ford deal fell through he flew to England and agreed a contract. In December 1963, Crosthwaite returned to the UK to join British Formula 1 team BRM as chassis designer. His first job was to modify the suspension geometry on the BRM P261. Next, he worked on Tony Rudd's ingenious monocoque and engine designs to find a way of mounting the engine, gearbox and rear suspension. His solution was to rigidly mount the engine to the monocoque at the driver's seatback and the rear suspension on the gearbox/final drive unit. The engine mountings were designed to spread the load over the length of the crankcase to protect the expensive castings in the event of a minor shunt. This was patented by BRM and became the norm in racing.

Crosthwaite worked with legends Graham Hill and Jackie Stewart during some of BRM's best years. In 1964 and 1965, Graham Hill finished second in the Drivers' Championship and BRM were second in the Constructors' Competition both years (five wins and eleven second places). It was Crosthwaite's idea to surprise Jackie Stewart by making him a tartan driving seat for his BRM P261 at the 1965 Monaco Grand Prix. Graham Hill finished first and Stewart third. Both Graham Hill and particularly Jackie Stewart liked the way Crosthwaite set up their cars and he was asked by Ken Tyrrell and Matra (Jackie Stewart's next team) to do consultancy work on their Formula 2 cars after he left BRM.

=== Intermeccanica ===
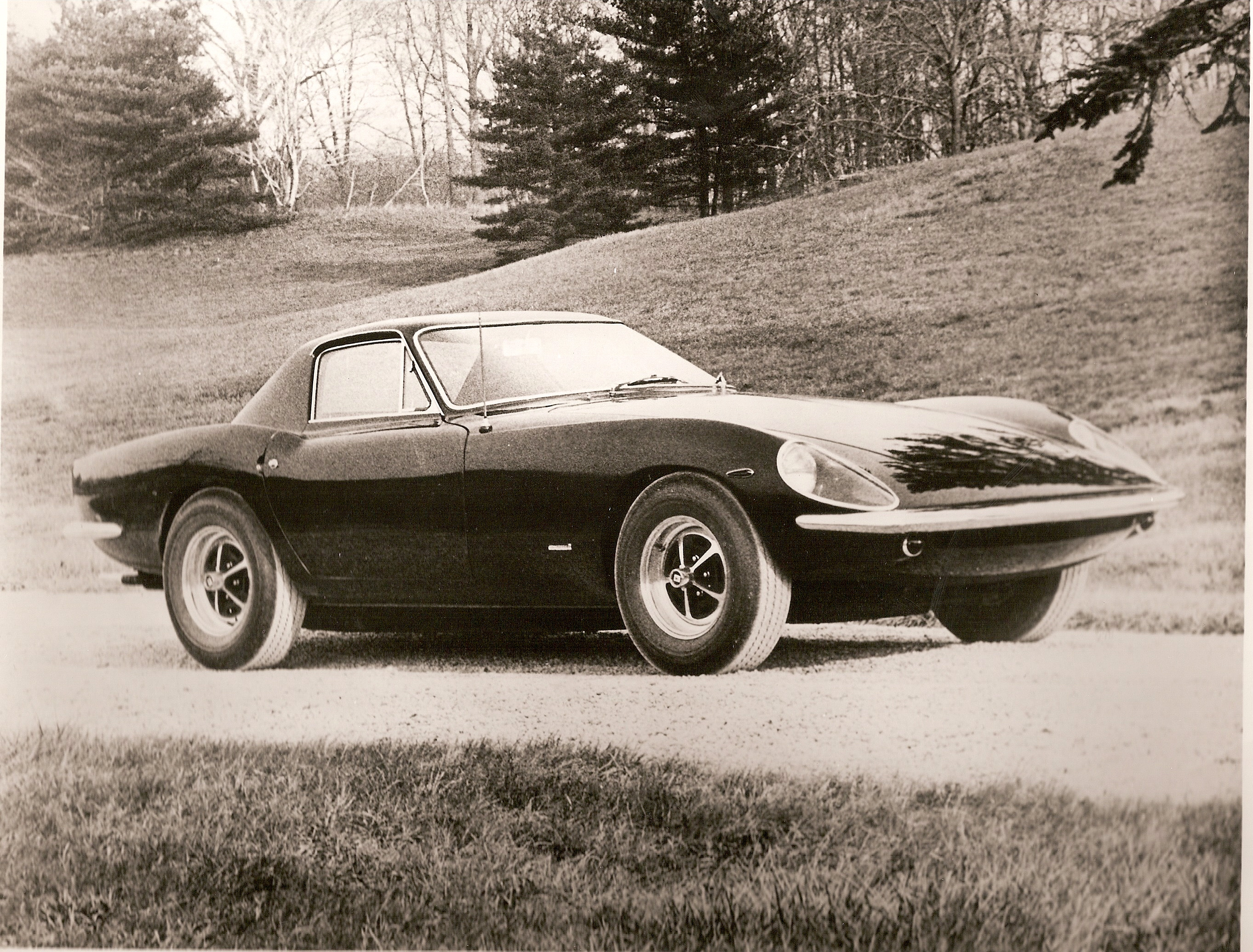
Intermeccanica Italia. 1966

Working as a consultant firstly with Jack Griffith, then Frank Reisner in Turin, Crosthwaite designed the chassis for the Robert Cumberford shaped car the Intermeccanica Italia.

Crosthwaite altered and improved the set up and suspension on the Lola T70 of New York-based racing driver John 'Buck' Fulp. Fulp won the Watkins Glen Sports Car Grand Prix and the Riverside 300 km in 1966.

At Alan Mann Racing, Crosthwaite modified and prepared Ford GT40s for the 1966 Le Mans 24-hour race and Spa 1000 km. The John Whitmore/Frank Gardner driven car finished second in the Spa 1000 km race. Graham Hill drove one of the cars at Le Mans.

=== Reliant Motor Company - Scimitar GTE ===
Ray Wiggin at Reliant Motor Company was looking for a chassis specialist and Crosthwaite moved there in January 1966 initially as a consultant to modify the SE4 Scimitar GT Coupe chassis and suspension so improving the ride and handling. Stirling Moss said of the changes - 'it now qualifies for the classic definition of a grand touring car, one which permits driver and passenger and their luggage to cover long distances on European high speed roads in complete comfort'. Crosthwaite was asked to install Ford's new V6 in place of the old straight 6-cylinder engine in the SE4a and improve the handling and road holding of the Turkish made Anadol. Reliant were pleased with his modifications and approached him for the job of Chief Engineer in August 1966.

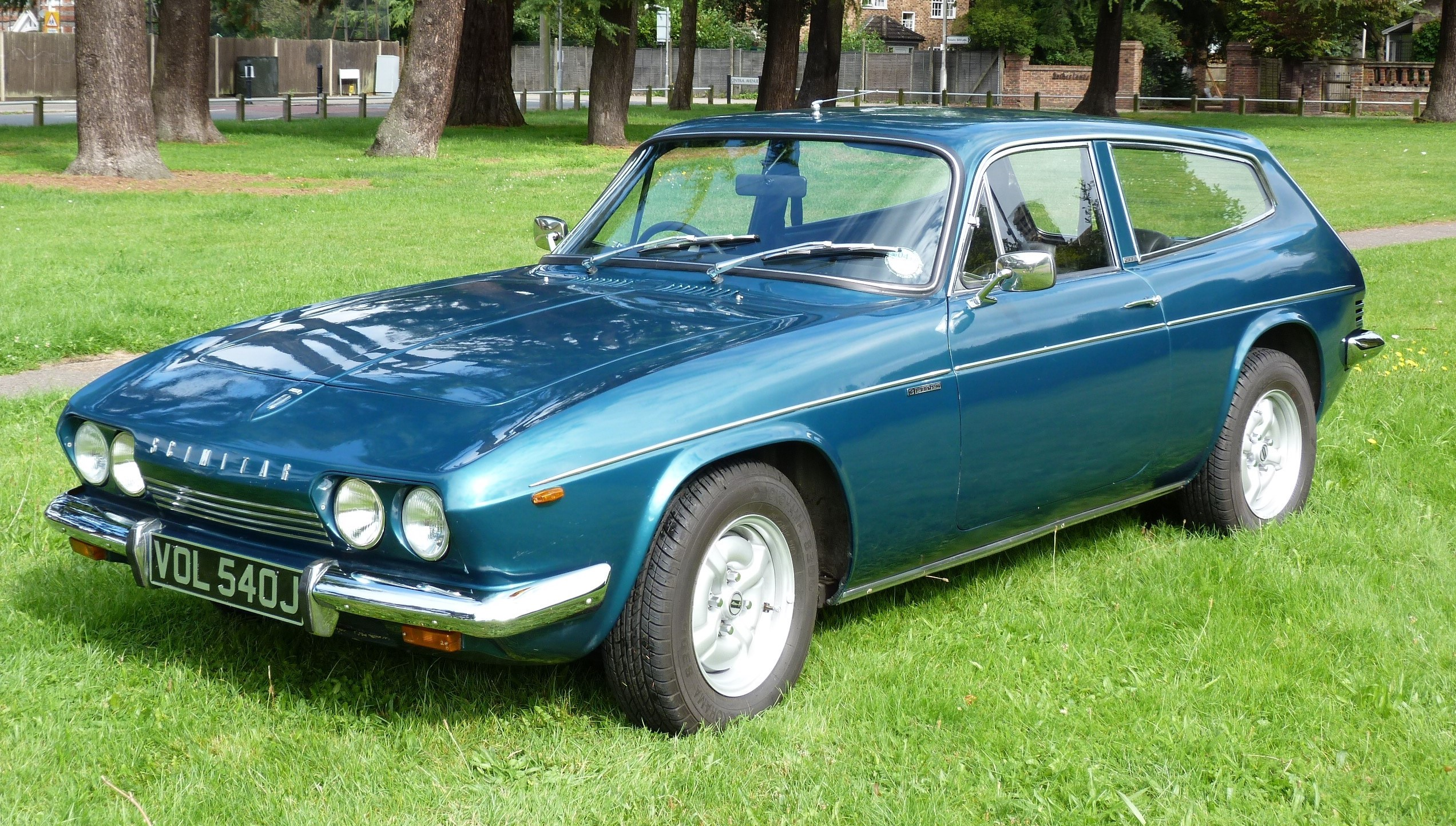
Crosthwaite's own SE5 Reliant Scimitar GTE

In 1967, Tom Karen of Ogle Design was asked to submit some body designs for a new four-seater Scimitar, the SE5 Reliant Scimitar GTE. Managing Director Ray Wiggin, Chief Engineer Crosthwaite and fibreglass body expert Ken Wood went to Ogle's in Letchworth to look at a couple of mock-up body designs for the new SE5, mostly cardboard and sticky tape. There was no doubt in Crosthwaite's mind that it was the right shape. Wiggin told Ken Wood to go ahead and do a proper master. The SE5 was conceived and ready for the 1968 Earls Court Motor Show in under 12 months. For the SE5, Crosthwaite and his team designed a completely different chassis frame, revised and improved suspension, new and relocated fuel tank, a rollover bar, new cooling system, spare wheel mounted in the nose to give increased rear space and a 17-gallon fuel tank. The car had separate folding rear seats and later a rear windscreen wiper, both firsts. When designing the chassis, Crosthwaite worked closely with Ogle body stylist Peter Bailey to modify and refine the prototype. The design was so successful that the basic chassis and suspension geometry remained the same until the last version of the GTE was produced 20 years later. Journalists were divided in their opinions of the vehicle, but once they actually got to drive it they were usually impressed with the performance, handling, and practicality.

Crosthwaite also drew up the chassis for the Reliant Kitten and the Tom Karen / Ogle styled Bond Bug.

=== Hyundai Motor Company ===
In early 1974, Crosthwaite was head hunted as a chassis specialist along with five other car engineers and executives including George Turnbull (businessman) by the South Korean company Hyundai Motor Company to help start up their now thriving car production company. This led to the production of the Hyundai Pony in 1975.

=== Reef Engineering ===
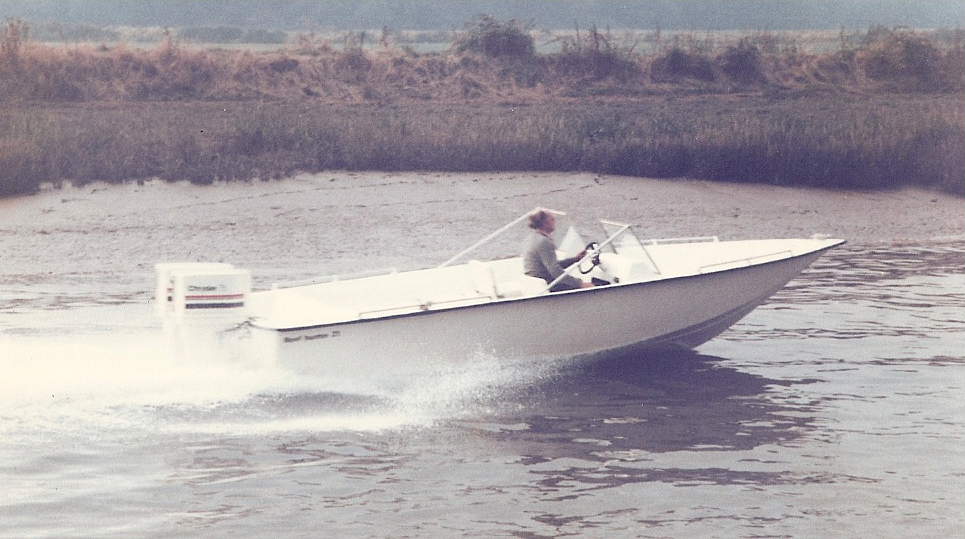
Reef Hunter motorboat

In late 1977, at the end of his three year contract with Hyundai, Crosthwaite returned to England to start his own company, Reef Engineering, to produce and export open top cars for holiday resorts in the Seychelles and the West Indies. They were called Cubs, the chassis based on his Kitten design and the body styled by Peter Bailey. He also designed and produced motorboats and Icarus sailboards. Crosthwaite was influenced by his interests as he was very keen on watersports, including scuba diving, water skiing and windsurfing.

In the 1980s, Crosthwaite was commissioned to do designs for specialist car production companies. These included the Jimp, a kind of mini Land Rover look alike, and the Salamander, intended as a replacement for the AC Cars invalid carriage.

Crosthwaite was a member of the Car and General Technical Board for the Society of Motor Manufacturers and Traders from 1968 to 1974 and a member of the British Racing Drivers Club from 1956 until 1983.

== Later life ==
Crosthwaite retired to the South Coast of England in the late 1980s. Active, energetic and enthusiastic, he continued to windsurf and ride mountain bikes 'off-road' until he was 76 years old, when he fractured his hip in a cycling accident on the South Downs.

John Crosthwaite died on 5 September 2010 while on holiday in Tralee, Eire.
