= Panorama City Special (dragster) =

Overview
- Production: 1955
- Designer: Mickey Thompson

Body and chassis
- Class: Top Fuel
- Body style: Slingshot streamliner dragster

Dimensions
- Wheelbase: 97 in (2,500 mm)

The Panorama City Special is a pioneering streamliner dragster.

Believed to be the first "slingshot" dragster, the Panorama City Special (designed by hot rodder Mickey Thompson) had a full body, including skirted rear wheels, and a cockpit windshield wrapping around and over the driver. The steel front wheels were covered by lakester-style wheel discs (Moon discs). The car debuted in 1955, at the first NHRA U.S. Nationals at Great Bend, Kansas. The wheelbase was only 97 in (2,500 mm).

In its initial outing, it proved much slower than the competition, hitting only 142 mph (229 km/h), when others were reaching almost 150 mph (240 km/h). Later in 1955, however, it became the first single-engined fueller to exceed 150 mph (240 km/h), recording a speed of 151.26 mph (243.43 km/h).

== Sources ==
- Taylor, Thom. "Beauty Beyond the Twilight Zone" in Hot Rod, April 2017, pp. 30–43.
