= Mickey Thompson Entertainment Group =

The Mickey Thompson Entertainment Group (MTEG) was a sanctioning body for an American short course off-road racing series that took place inside stadiums. Some events were televised, including on TNN and ESPN.

== History ==
Mickey Thompson raced desert trucks in the SCORE International series. Thompson said that he was seen "by nothing but cactus and jackrabbits." He reasoned that he needed to bring the excitement of desert racing to a wider audience.

The body and series were established by Thompson in 1979. The first event was held in the Los Angeles Coliseum. The body also sanctioned motorcycle races called Supercross. The stadium series survived Thompson's 1988 murder. The body went bankrupt in 1996. The concept of stadium off-road racing was revived with the creation of the Stadium Super Trucks in 2013 by former series champion Robby Gordon.

== Vehicle classes ==
- Grand National Sport Trucks
- Super 1600s
- Sport Utility Vehicles (also known as Ultrastock)
- Superlites
- Ultracross
- All Terrain Vehicles

== Grand National Sport Trucks champions ==
- 1983 – Ivan Stewart
- 1984 – Ivan Stewart
- 1985 – Roger Mears
- 1986 – Steve Millen
- 1987 – Jeff Huber
- 1988 – Steve Millen
- 1989 – Robby Gordon
- 1990 – Ivan Stewart
- 1991 – Walker Evans
- 1992 – Rod Millen
- 1993 – Rod Millen
- 1994 – Rod Millen

== Other notable drivers ==
- Evan Evans – stadium series
- Jimmie Johnson – stadium series
- Rob MacCachren – stadium series
- Casey Mears – stadium series
- Jerry Whelchel – winningest driver in stadium series history
