= Dominguez–Escalante National Conservation Area =

Wilderness preserve in the U.S. state of Colorado

- IUCN category V (protected landscape/seascape)
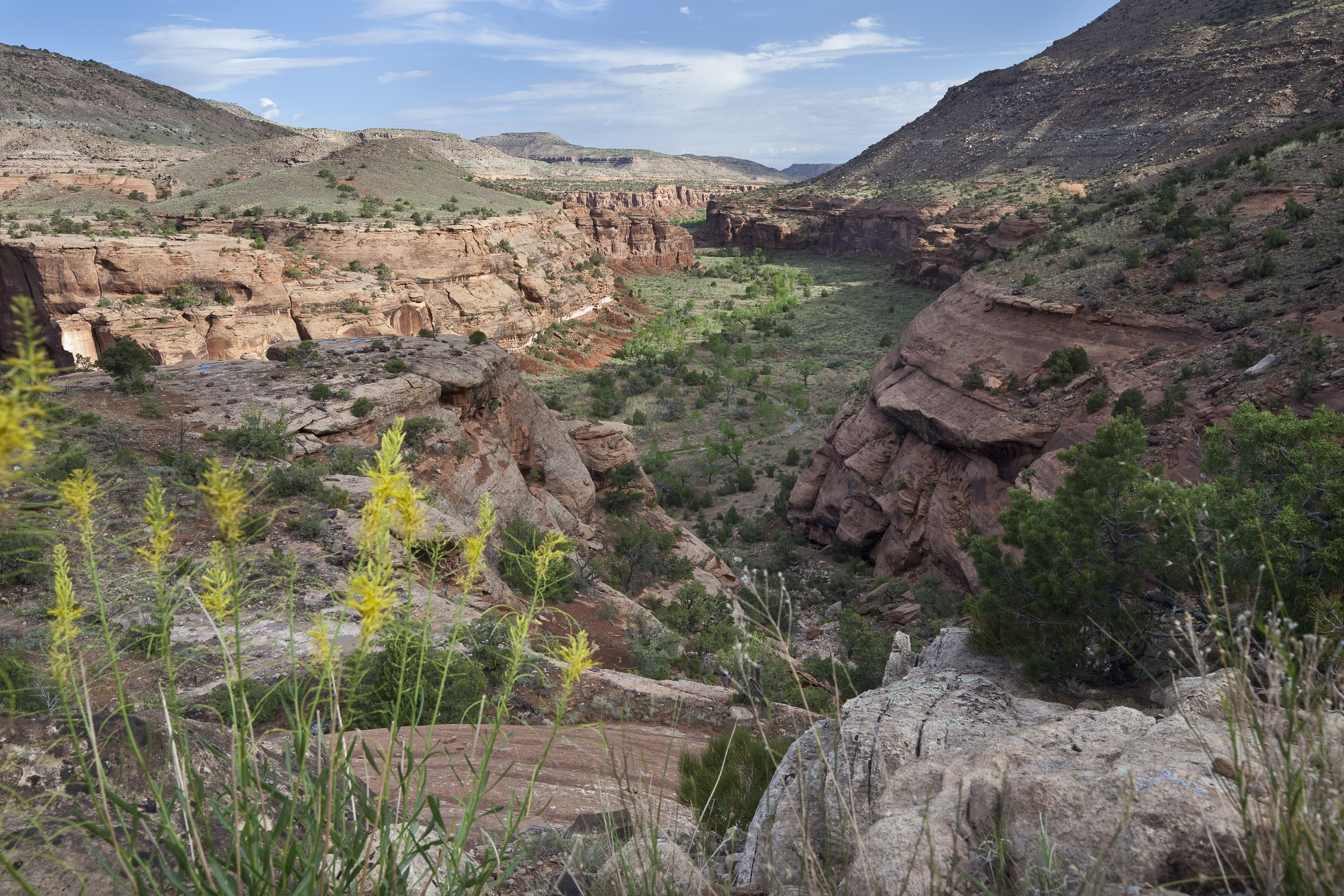

- Location within the United States
- Location: Delta, Mesa, and Montrose counties Colorado, United States
- Nearest city: Grand Junction, Colorado
- Coordinates: 38.780°N 108.360°W
- Area: 209,610 acres (848.3 km^{2})
- Established: 2009
- Governing body: Bureau of Land Management
- Website: www.blm.gov/co/st/en/nca/denca.html

The Dominguez–Escalante National Conservation Area is a 209,610-acre (848.3 km^{2}) National Conservation Area located in western Colorado southeast of Grand Junction and northwest of Montrose. It is managed by the Bureau of Land Management (BLM) and was created as part of the Omnibus Public Land Management Act of 2009. A total of 66,280 acres (26,820 ha) were also designated as the Dominguez Canyon Wilderness in 2009.

The Dominguez–Escalante National Conservation Area (NCA) encompasses canyons of the Uncompahgre Plateau along the Gunnison River. The southwest side of the NCA borders Uncompahgre National Forest. There are many hiking and backpacking trails and campsites in the NCA and other opportunities for outdoor recreation.
