= Log Hill Mesa =

Mesa in Colorado, United States

Coordinates: 38.210545°N 107.904508°W

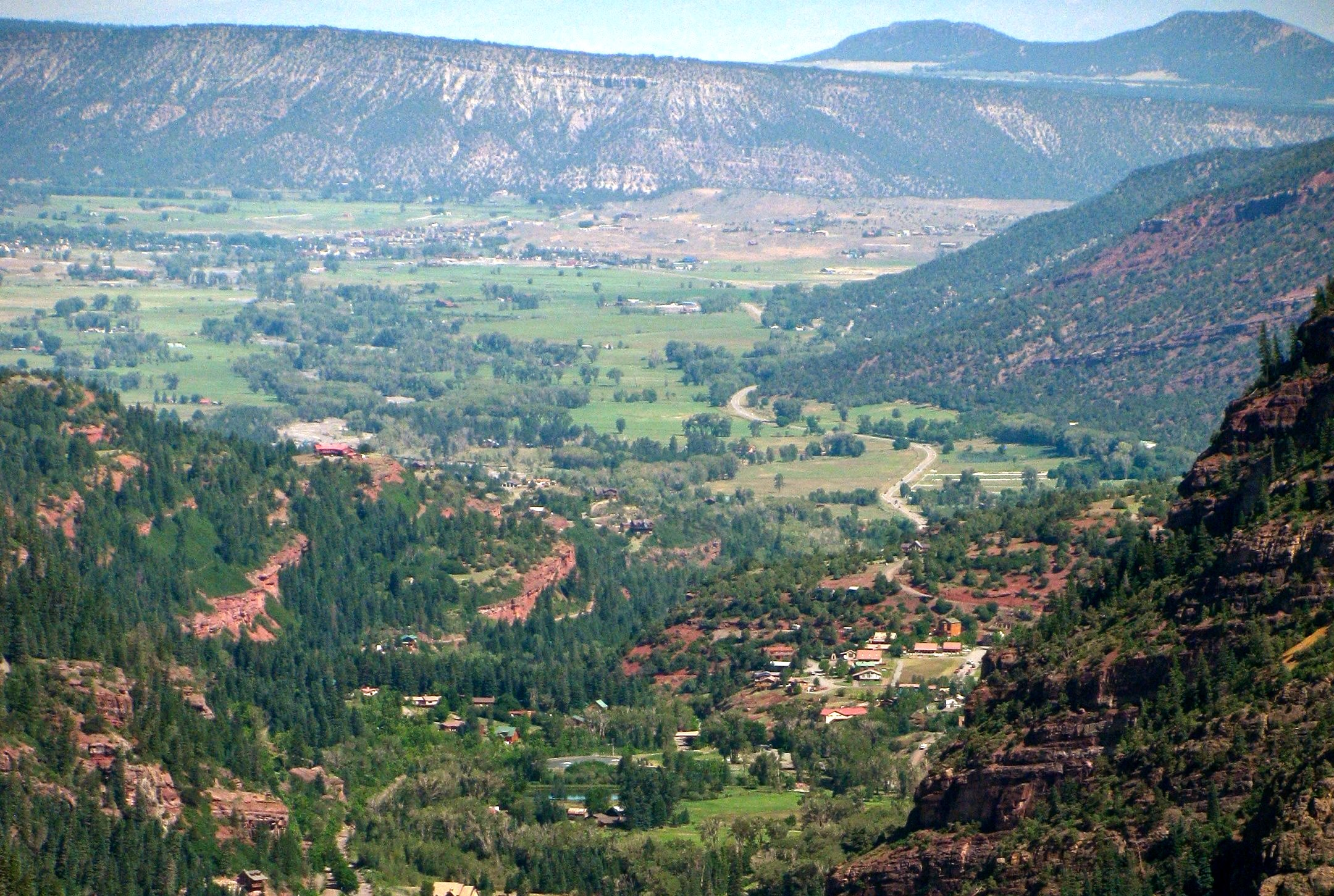
Log Hill Mesa viewed from San Juan Mountains

Log Hill Mesa is a mesa in Ouray County, Colorado. Log Hill Mesa includes part of the southern end of the Uncompahgre Plateau and faces south towards the Sneffels Range.

== Recreation ==
Log Hill Mesa is home to the mountain resort community of Loghill Village. In addition to the amenities of Loghill Village, the mesa is popular as a hiking, cross country skiing, and biking destination.

== See also ==
- Cimmaron Range
- Sneffels Range
