= Uncompahgre Plateau =

Plateau in Colorado, United States

Coordinates: 38°33′N 108°28′W

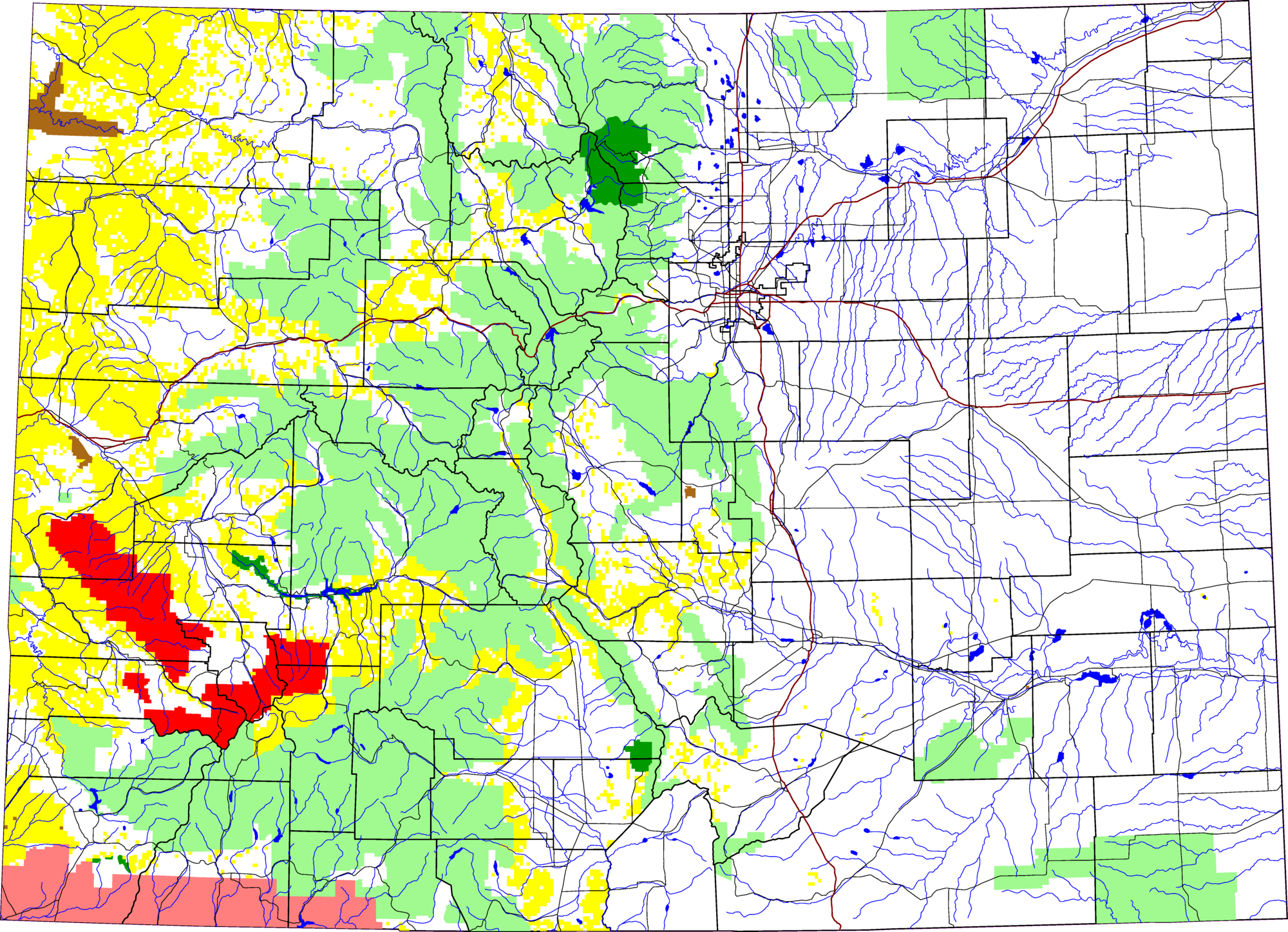
Uncompahgre National Forest (red) location in Colorado

The Uncompahgre Plateau in western Colorado is a distinctive large uplift part of the Colorado Plateau. Uncompahgre is a Ute word that describes the water: "Dirty Water" or "Rocks that make Water Red".

The plateau, with an average elevation of 9,500 feet (2,900 m), rises from the Colorado River 4,600 ft (1,400 m) to Horsefly Peak 10,300 ft (3,100 m). It continues on about 90 miles (140 km) southeast to the northwest margin of the San Juan Mountains. Its boundaries are the San Miguel and Dolores Rivers to the west, the Colorado River to the north and the Gunnison and Uncompahgre Rivers on the eastern side.

Large canyons such as Big Red, Tabeguache, Spring Creek, Roubideau, Escalante, Big Dominquez, and Unaweep are separated by generally flat mesas. The Plateau watersheds include four tributaries of the Colorado River: Dolores River, Gunnison River, San Miguel River and Uncompahgre River.

The Uncompahgre Plateau includes about 2,290 square miles (5,900 km^{2}) in five counties: Delta, Mesa, Montrose, Ouray, and San Miguel.

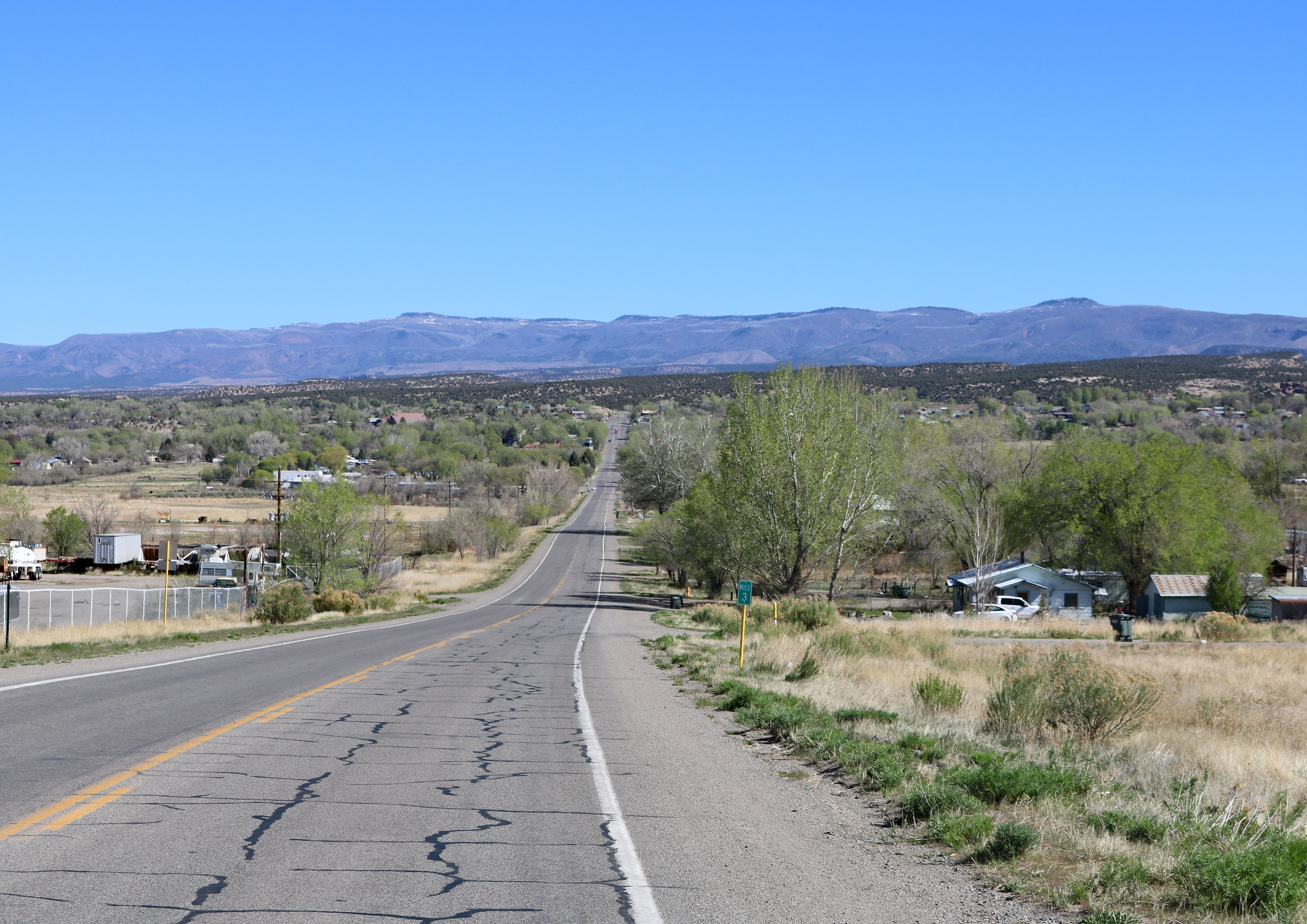
The Uncompahgre Plateau (the highest land in the back) rising above Nucla, Colorado.

The plateau is under the management of:

- United States Forest Service Uncompahgre National Forest land 545,907 acres (2,209.21 km^{2}) (37%)
- Bureau of Land Management 545,280 acres (2,206.7 km^{2}) (37%)
- State of Colorado: Colorado State Land Board and Colorado Parks and Wildlife land 8,689 acres (35.16 km^{2}) (<1%)
- Private property, mostly in the Uncompahgre Valley, totals 365,547 acres (1,479.32 km^{2}) (25%)

== Geology ==
Located in Southwest Colorado, the Uncompahgre Plateau is a high domed upland rising from the Colorado River. When it was formed, strong forces in the crust of the Earth forced the land to lift up.

== See also ==
- Log Hill Mesa
